= Mitsubishi Lancer =

Japanese automobile

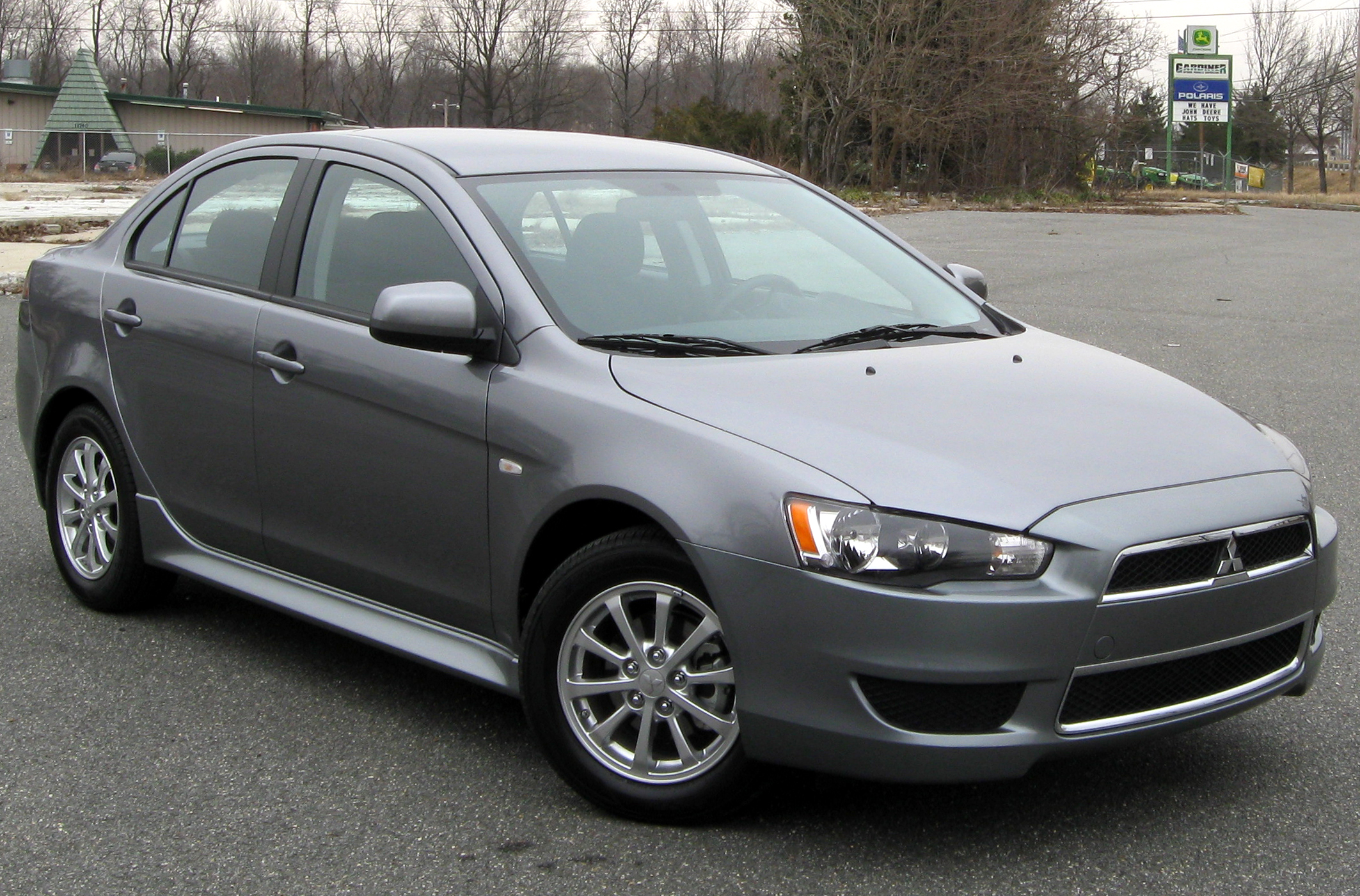
- 2012 Mitsubishi Lancer SE

Overview
- Manufacturer: Mitsubishi Motors
- Production: February 1973 – August 2017 (worldwide); December 1993 – April 2024 (Taiwan)

Body and chassis
- Class: Subcompact car (1973–1995); Compact car (1996–2024)
- Layout: Front-engine, rear-wheel-drive (1973–1987); Front-engine, front-wheel-drive (1982–2024); Front-engine, four-wheel-drive (2007–2017)

Chronology
- Predecessor: Mitsubishi Colt 1200/1500

The Mitsubishi Lancer is an automobile that was produced by the Japanese manufacturer Mitsubishi Motors from 1973 until 2024.

The Lancer has been marketed as the Colt Lancer, Dodge Colt, Plymouth Colt, Chrysler Valiant Lancer, Chrysler Lancer, Eagle Summit, Hindustan Lancer, Soueast Lioncel, and Mitsubishi Mirage in various countries at different times, and has been sold as the Mitsubishi Galant Fortis in Japan since 2007. It has also been sold as Mitsubishi Lancer Fortis in Taiwan with a different facelift than the Galant Fortis. In Japan, it was originally sold at a specific retail chain called Galant Shop.

Between its introduction in 1973 and 2008, over six million units were sold. There have been ten generations of Lancers.

Mitsubishi ended production of the Lancer in August 2017 worldwide, with the exception of Taiwan. An extensive facelift was given to the car by Pininfarina's Chinese offices. Production in Taiwan ended in 2024, marking the end of the Lancer nameplate after 51 years.

== First generation (A70; 1973) ==
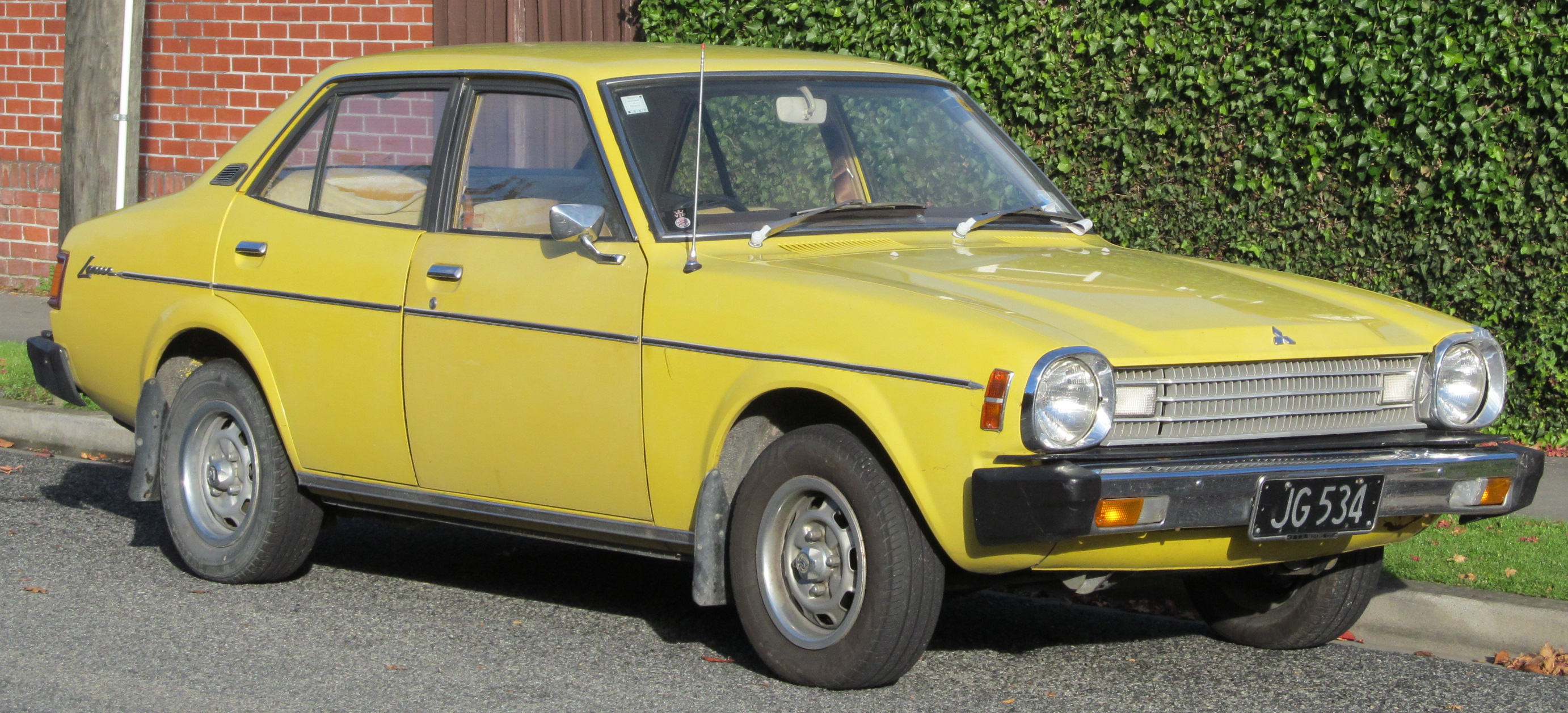
Mitsubishi Lancer sedan

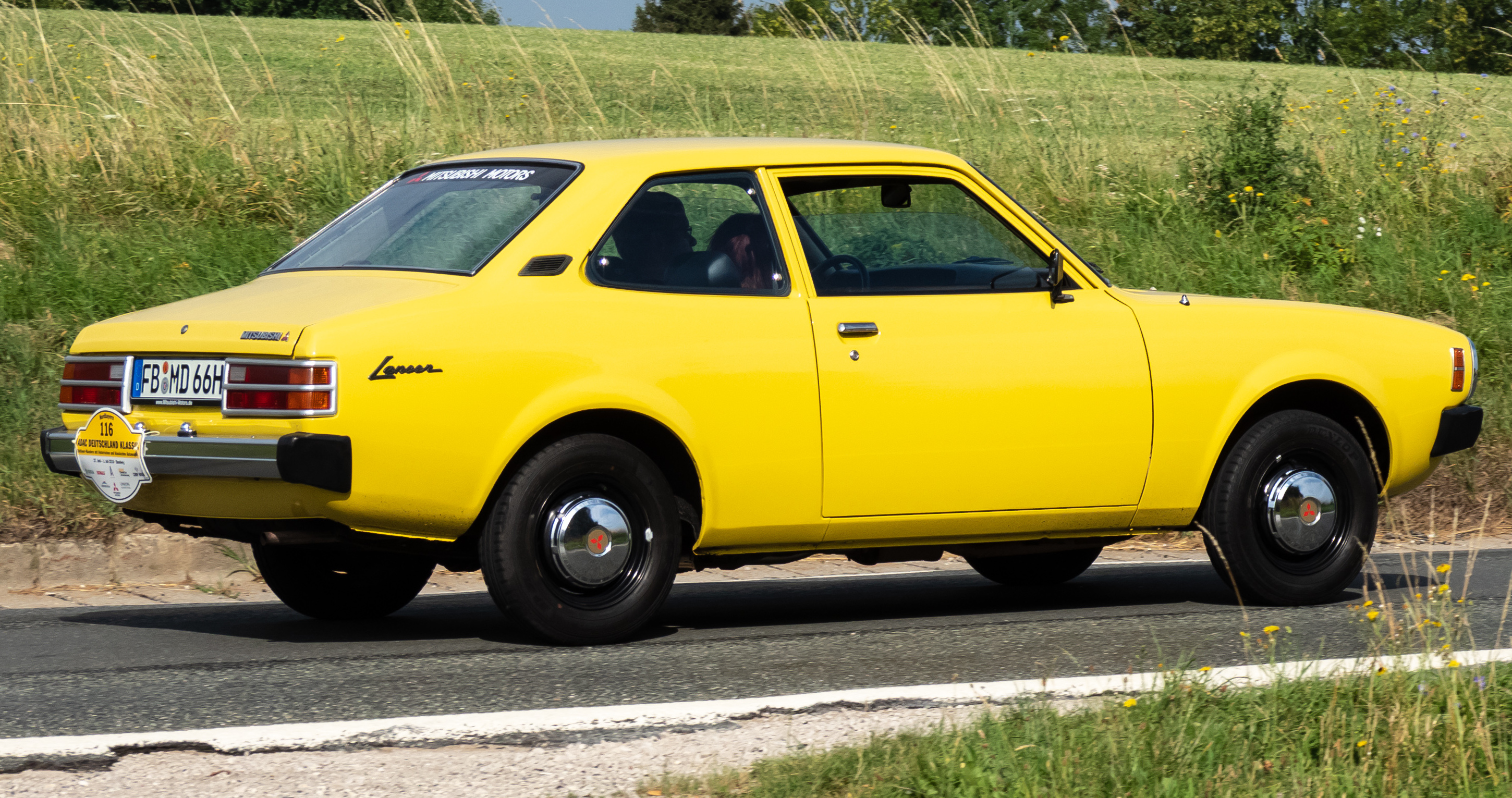
Mitsubishi Lancer coupe

The first Lancer (A70) was launched in February 1973. It served to fill the gap between the Minica kei car and the larger Galant. The sporting 1600 GSR model began the Lancer's long and successful rally history, winning the Safari Rally twice and the Southern Cross Rally four times.

There were four body styles, two- and four-door sedans, a two-door hardtop coupe and a long-running five-door station wagon (built until replaced by the front-wheel drive Lancer/Mirage Van in March 1984). Engines were different 1.2-liter, 1.4-liter, and 1.6-liter fours.

This car was marketed under a variety of names: Dodge Colt in the United States, Plymouth Colt in Canada, Dodge Lancer in some Latin American countries, Chrysler Valiant Lancer in Australia, and Colt Lancer in some European markets.

=== Celeste ===
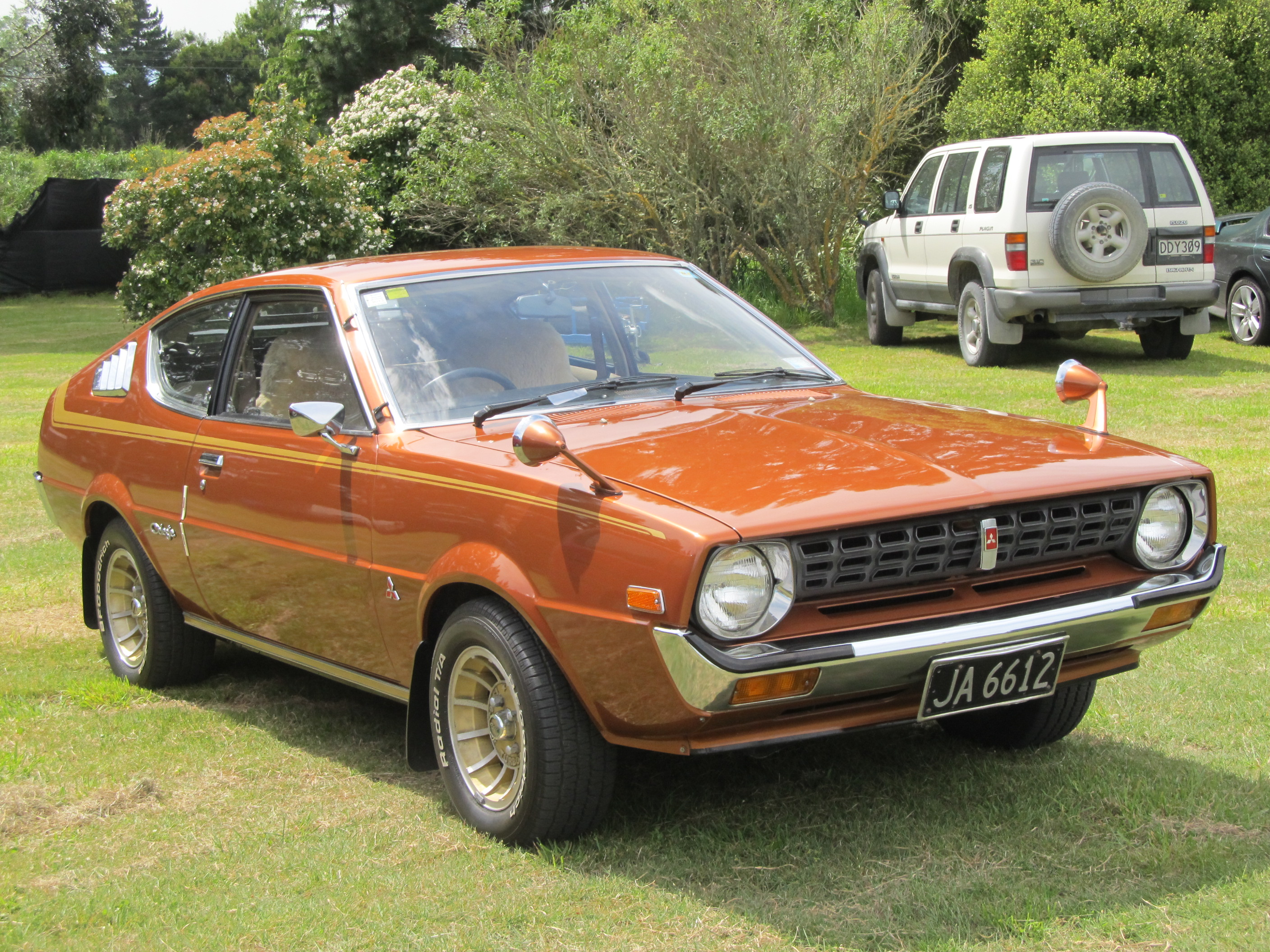
Mitsubishi Lancer Celeste liftback

In February 1975, the Lancer was complemented by a hatchback called the Lancer Celeste, succeeding the Galant FTO. It was also called the Mitsubishi Celeste (New Zealand) or Colt Celeste in some markets; and sold as the Chrysler Lancer in Australia, the Dodge Lancer Celeste in El Salvador, the Plymouth Arrow in the United States, and the Dodge Arrow in Canada.

The Celeste was originally available with 1.4- and 1.6-liter options, while a bigger 2.0-liter model was added later. An even larger 2.6-liter four was available in the US-market Plymouth Fire Arrow. The Celeste was facelifted in 1978, receiving square headlights and bigger squarer bumpers. Production of the Lancer Celeste ended in July 1981 and it was replaced by the front-wheel drive Cordia in early 1982.

== Second generation (EX/A170; 1979) ==
Second generation
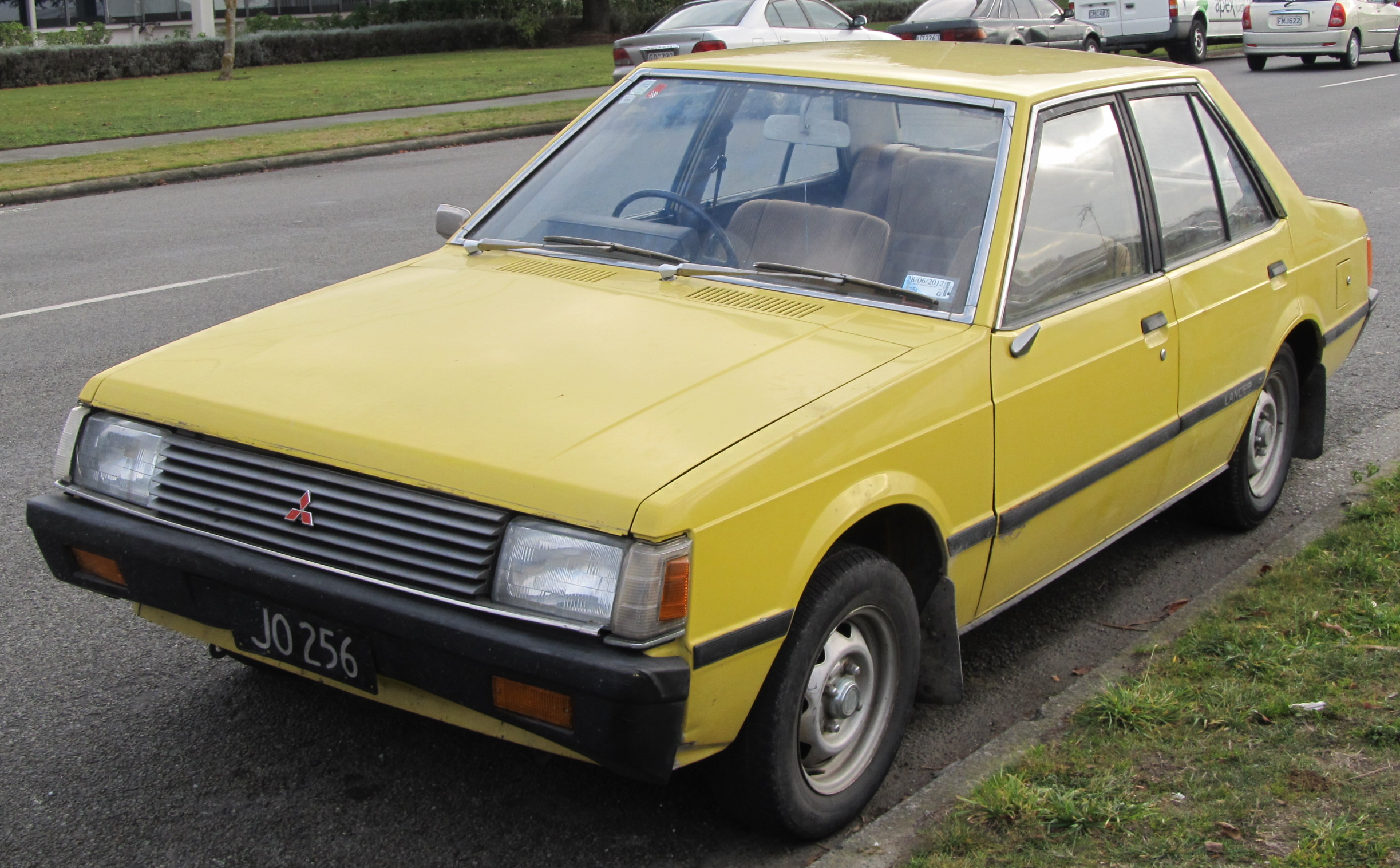

Overview
- Also called: Colt Lancer (UK)
- Production: 1979–1987
- Assembly: Japan: Okazaki (Nagoya Plant); New Zealand: Todd Park; Philippines: Cainta; Thailand: Laem Chabang (Mitsubishi Motors Thailand); Indonesia: Pademangan, North Jakarta (PT. Krama Yudha Kesuma Motor)
- Designer: Aldo Sessano of Fissore (design); Rakuzo Mitamura (engineering)

Body and chassis
- Body style: 4-door sedan
- Layout: Front-engine, rear-wheel drive

Powertrain
- Engine: Petrol engines: 1244 cc 4G11 I4 (A171A); 1410 cc 4G12 I4 (A172A); 1439 cc 4G33 I4 (A173A; Indonesia); 1597 cc 4G32 I4 (A174A); 1795 cc 4G62 I4 (A175A; Japan); 1795 cc 4G62T turbo I4 (A175A; Japan); 1997 cc 4G63T turbo I4 (A176A; Europe)
- Transmission: 4-speed manual; 5-speed manual; 3-speed automatic

Dimensions
- Wheelbase: 2,440 mm (96.1 in)
- Length: 4,225–4,230 mm (166.3–166.5 in)
- Width: 1,620 mm (63.8 in)
- Height: 1,380–1,390 mm (54.3–54.7 in)
- Curb weight: 895–1,070 kg (1,973–2,359 lb)

In 1979, the Lancer EX was presented in Japan. Its revised styling with integrated plastic bumpers reflected that of the recently introduced Galant and Sapporo. This generation is only available as 4-door sedan, while the previous generation Celeste coupé and wagon/van were continued for a few more years. More spacious, it grew in all dimensions. Only two engines were offered at first, a 1.4-litre MCA-Jet equipped engine paired with Mitsubishi's Silent Shaft Technology, which generated 80 PS (79 hp; 59 kW) and a 1.6-litre engine that generated 85 PS (84 hp; 63 kW). The MCA-Jet system was an entirely new concept when compared with the previously used carburetor system. The MCA stands for Mitsubishi Clean Air which meant that the EX passed both Japan and US emission standards, while the new cylinder head design of the engine gave way for a Jet valve which introduced an extra swirl of air to the combustion chamber, swirling the fuel-air mixture for a cleaner, efficient and more thorough burn.

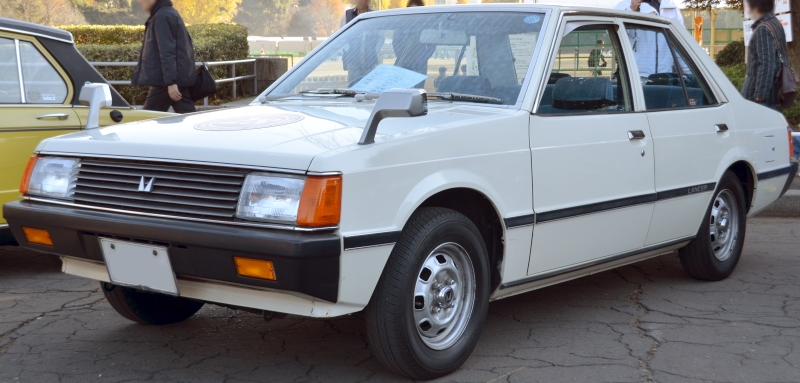
Pre-facelift (Japan)

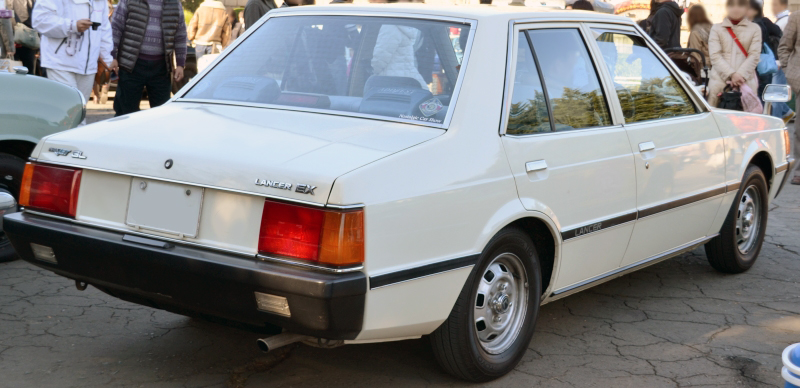
Pre-facelift (Japan)

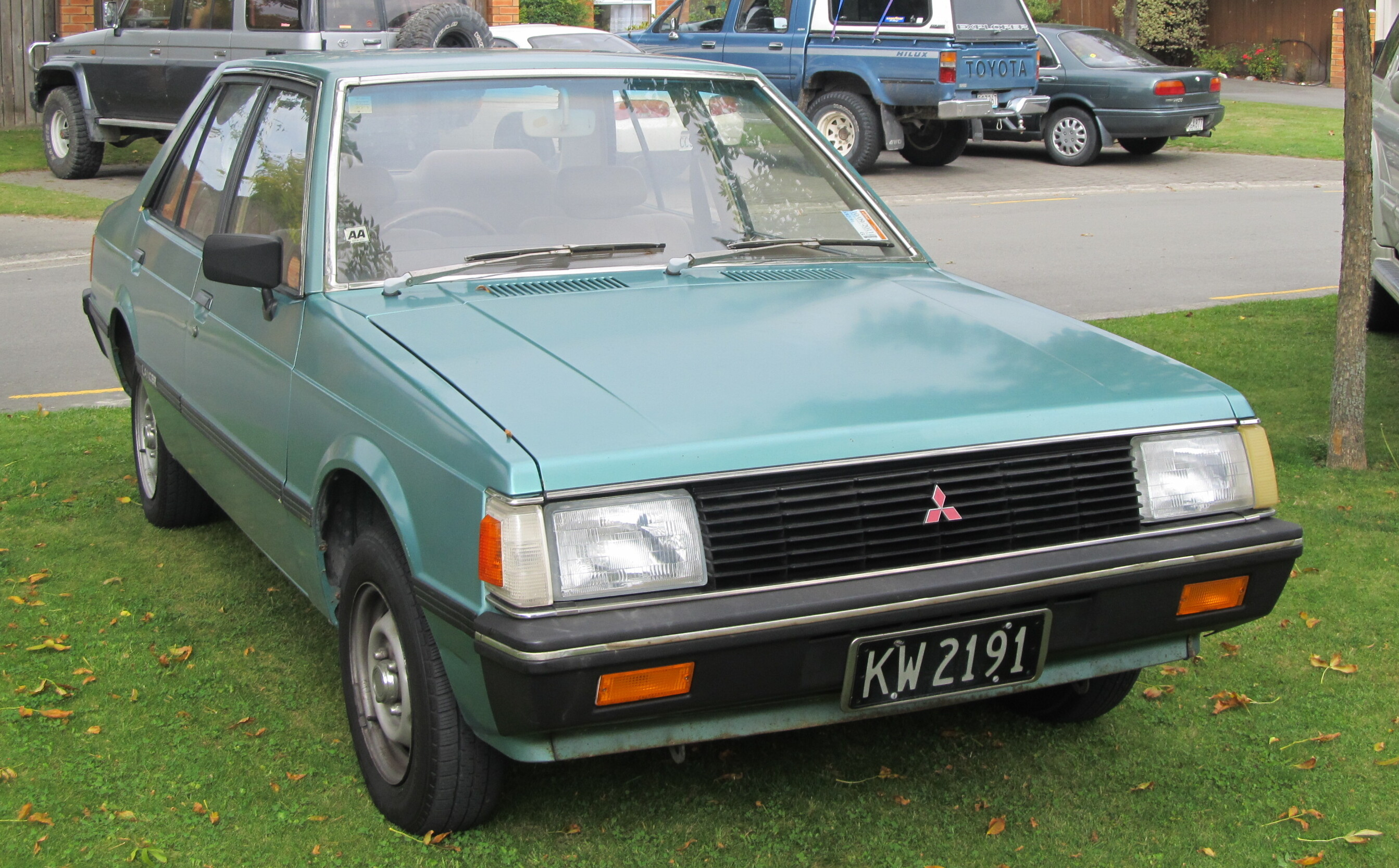
Facelift

Another innovation in the Lancer lineup was marketed as Silent Shaft Technology, consisting of two counterbalancing shafts that rotated in opposite directions, cancelling the power pulses inherent in an inline four-cylinder engine. This reduced both engine noise and vibration, and provided a smoother driving experience. The 1.8-litre Sirius 80 engines were then introduced in the Lancer in 1980, expanding the Lancer's range of engines. Also, a turbocharged, 135 PS (133 hp; 99 kW) engine was added in 1980 for sportier performance, and an intercooler system was also integrated in the existing turbocharged engine to produce 160 PS (158 hp; 118 kW) in 1983. In 1980, The Lancer EX was introduced with a 1.8-litre turbocharged inline-four option known as the 1800GSR and GT Turbo. The first generation 1800GSR and GT were only available with a turbocharged, non-intercooled 135 PS (133 hp; 99 kW).

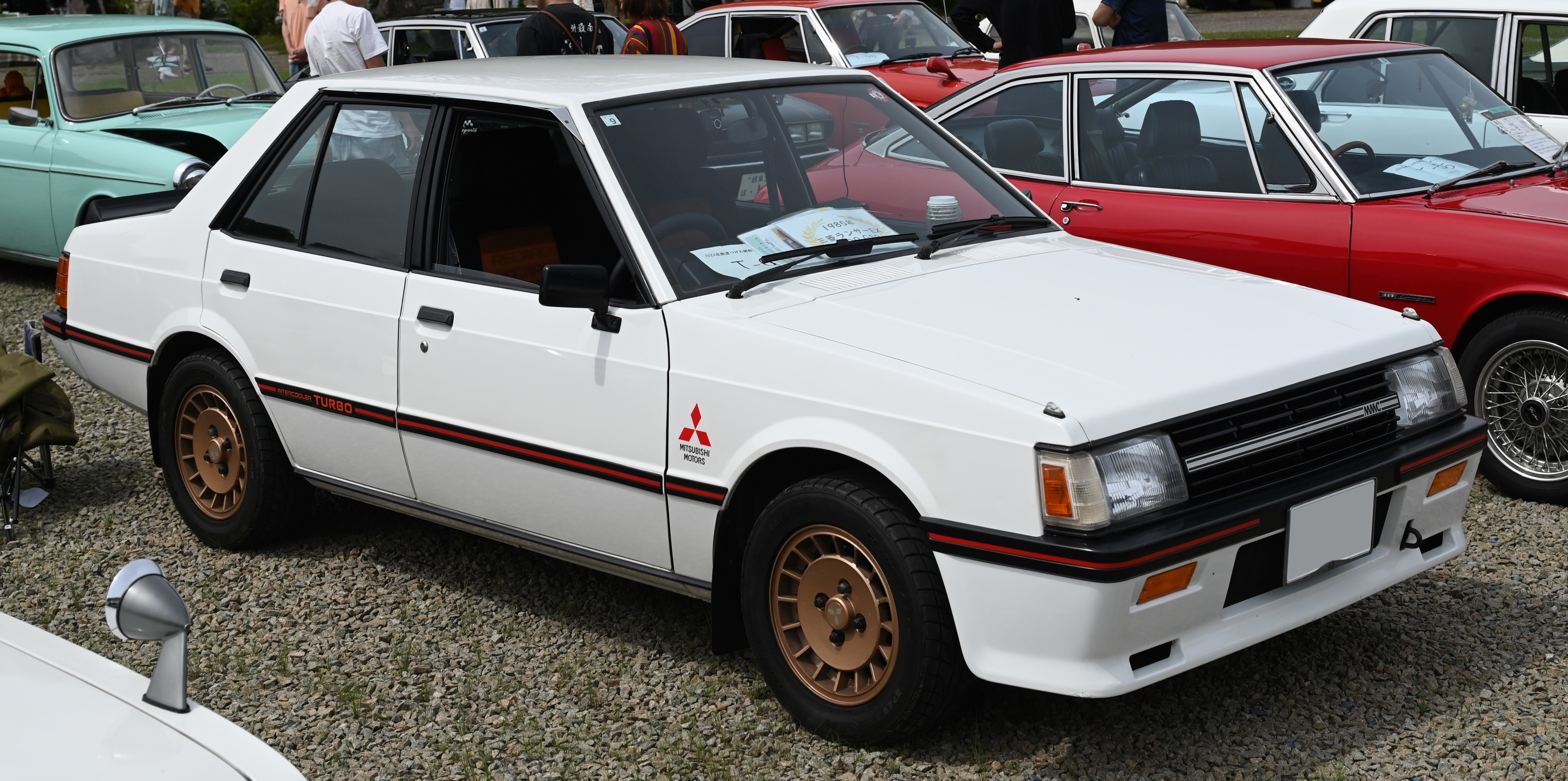
Mitsubishi Lancer 1800GSR (facelift; Japan)

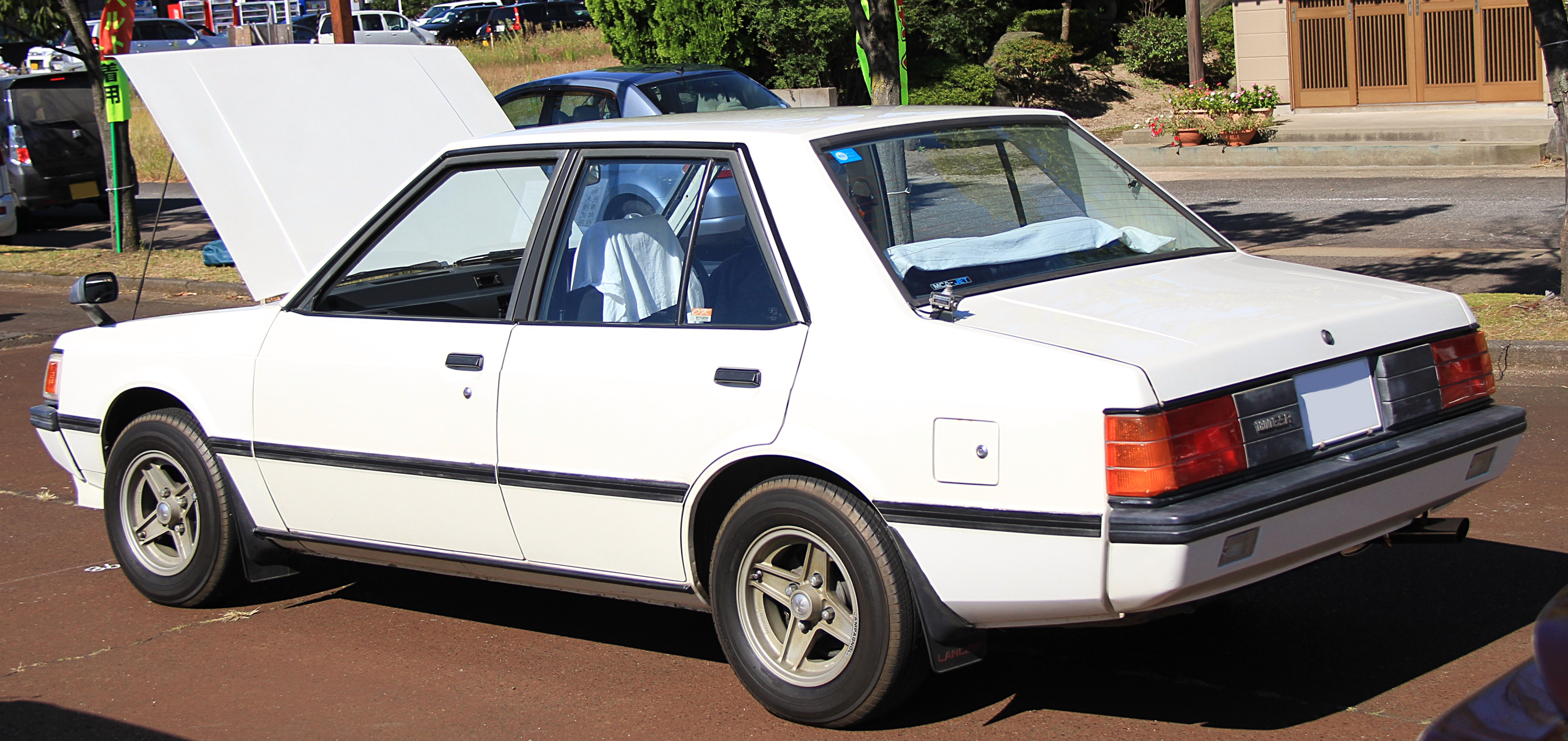
Mitsubishi Lancer 1800GSR (facelift; Japan)

New Zealand importer Todd Motors assembled the new Lancer EX from 1980 with 1.6-liter carburetor gasoline engine and a choice of manual or automatic transmission, a smaller 1.2-liter engine version of the Lancer EX was also available in the New Zealand market, popular in the fleet market. The model was also a popular base for rally cars in that market, with some success. It was replaced by the front-drive Tredia in 1982 with the Cordia coupé equivalent effectively replacing the earlier Celeste.

This generation was manufactured locally in Indonesia by Mitsubishi's partner, PT. Krama Yudha Kesuma Motor at their plant in Jakarta. Unique for this market, this generation was fitted with a 1.4-litre (1439 cc) 4G33 engine, inherited from the previous generation Lancer (never offered in the country) and possibly the only market that received this engine in this generation. It was only offered with a single trim called SL.

=== Europe ===
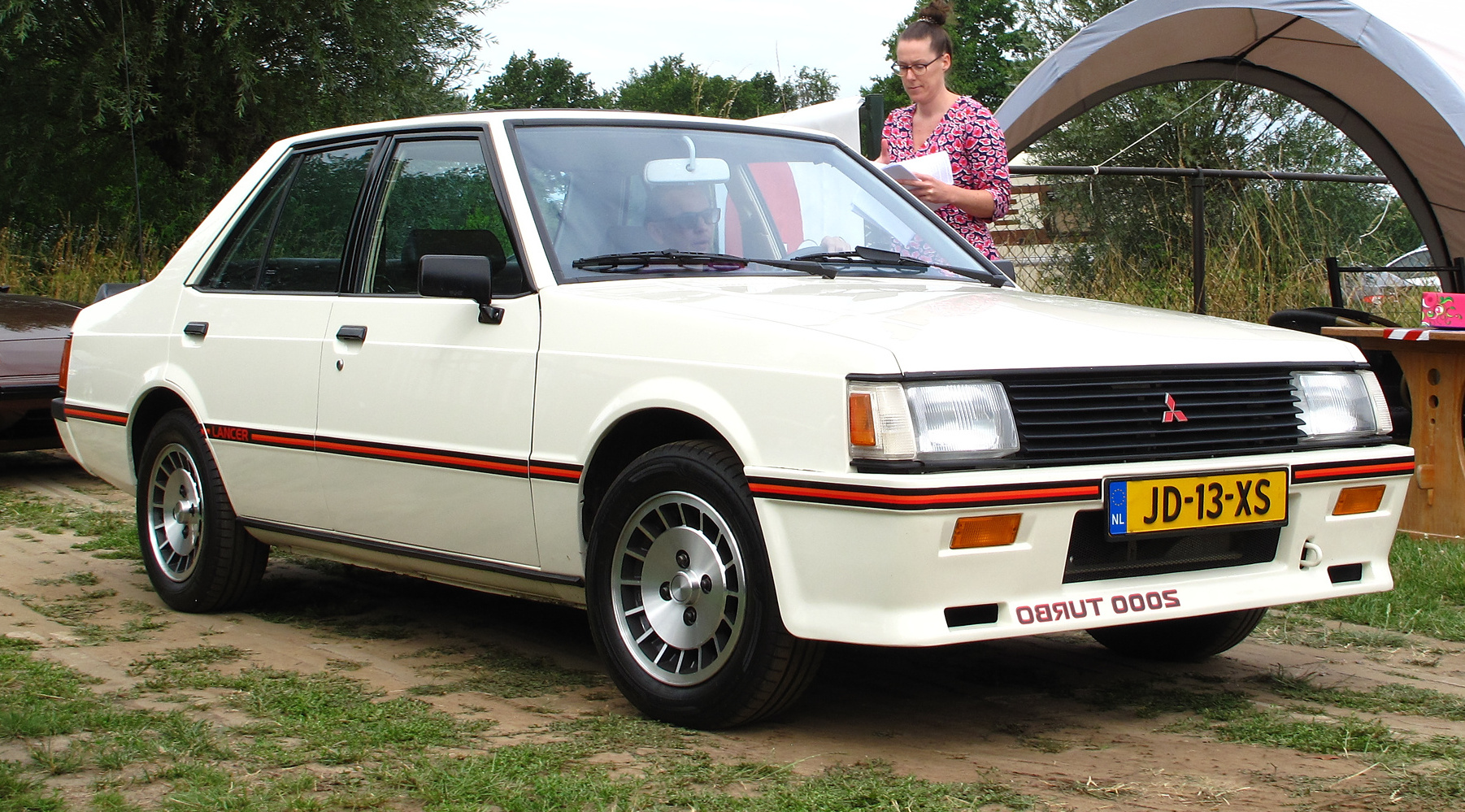

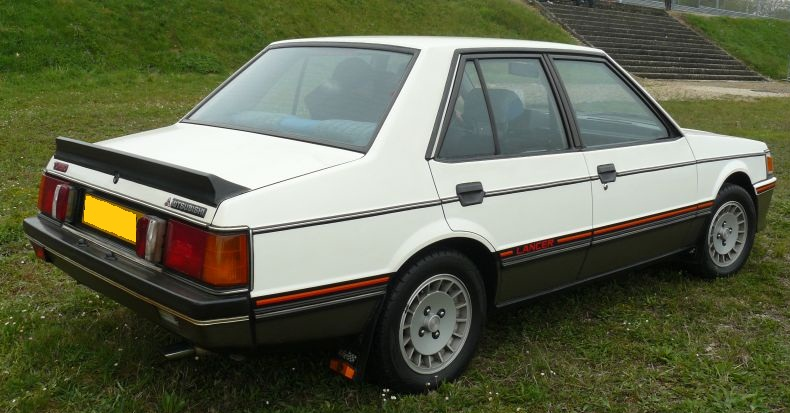
European market Mitsubishi Lancer 2000 Turbo

In Europe, the Lancer EX sold well as its restrained styling better matched the desires of European buyers than its somewhat fussy predecessor. Other considerations concerned handling and also the demand for more passenger room, as Mitsubishi tailored the Lancer towards European consumers. It went on sale locally after making its European première at the 1979 Frankfurt Show.

Unlike in Japan at the time of introduction, European buyers could get a 1.2-litre option which suited local tax conditions. This engine later did become available in Japan as well, beginning in May 1981, but was discontinued in 1983 after the introduction of the smaller Lancer Fiore. Claimed outputs in Europe were lower than in the domestic market because of the net rating, with the 1200, 1400, and 1600 being good for 40, 50, and 60 kW (54, 68, and 82 PS; 54, 67, and 80 hp) respectively. Here, the Lancer EX was also offered with a turbocharged 2.0-litre SOHC engine, known as the Lancer EX2000 Turbo. It achieved a maximum output of 170 PS (168 hp; 125 kW) and managed a top speed of 200 km/h (124 mph). This model was equipped with Electronically Controlled Injection (ECI).

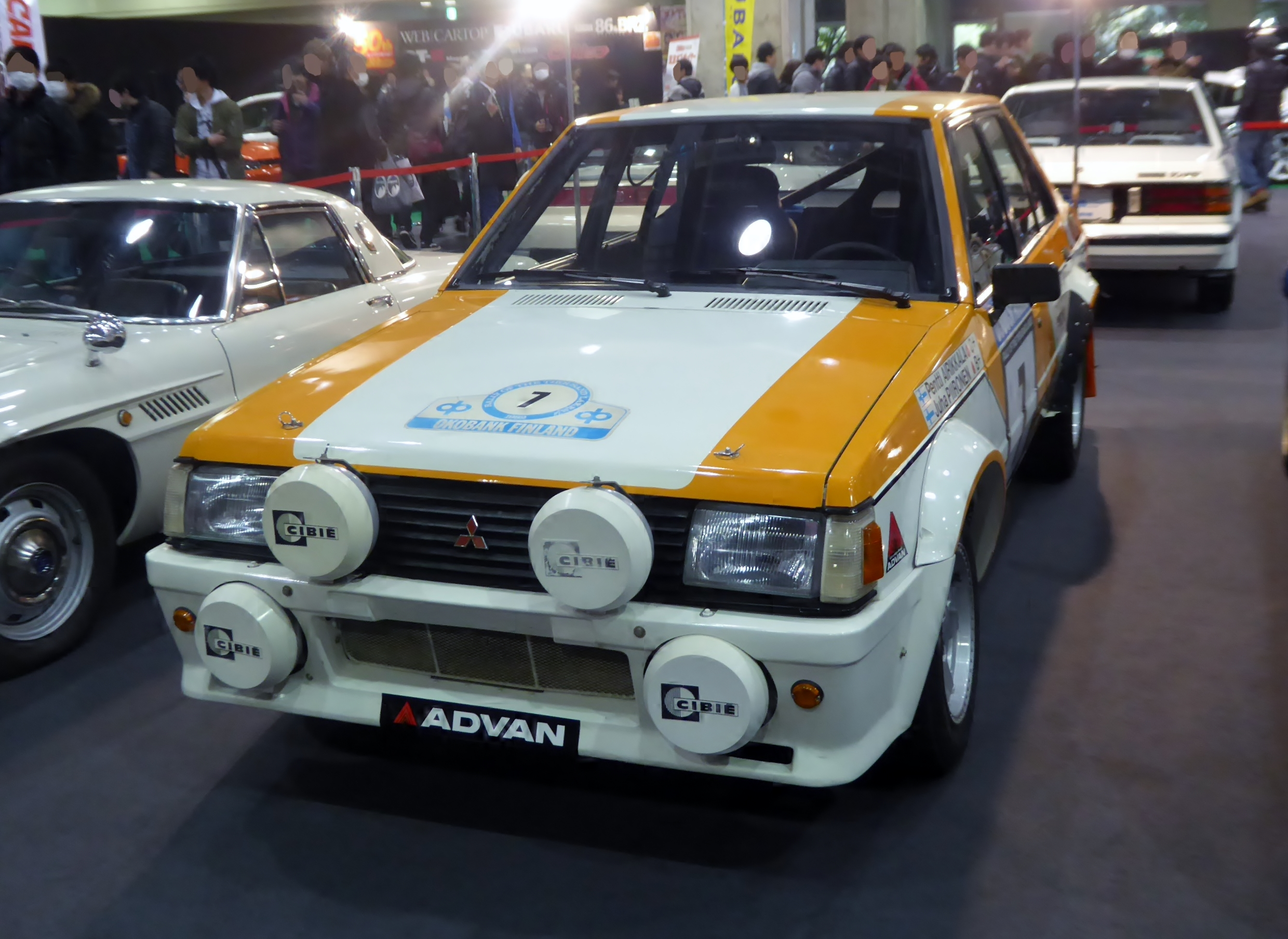
Mitsubishi Lancer 2000 Turbo rally car

A rally version of the Lancer 2000 Turbo was made and homologated for Group 4 and Group B, made out 280 PS (276 hp; 206 kW). At home, sales of the turbo model were low because of emission regulations Japan imposed at that time.

=== Japan ===
While exports were generally halted in 1983, this generation continued to be available alongside the Mirage-based, front-wheel drive Lancer Fiore until 1987 in Japan.

- 1200 Custom, GL – Powered by a 1.2-liter engine, with a four or five-speed manual transmission (1981–1983).
- 1400 EL, GL, SL – Same as the 1200 but with a 1.4-litre engine option. The EL was the lowest priced version with very little equipment (1979–1987).
- 1600 GT – The lowest-cost sporting variant with 86 PS (63 kW) 1.6-litre engine (1979–1983).
- 1600 XL – Powered by the same 1.6-litre engine as the 1600 GT, also available with a three-speed automatic transmission (1979–1987).
- 1800 GSR – Similar to the 1600 GT but with a 100 PS (74 kW) 1.8-litre engine (1981–1984).
- 1800 SE – Powered by a 1.8-litre engine and available with a 5 speed manual transmission or a three-speed automatic transmission (1981–1983).
- 1800 GSR Turbo – Performance model powered by a turbocharged 1.8-litre engine producing 135 PS (99 kW), with aesthetic upgrades (1981–1983).
- 1800 GT Turbo – Same as the GSR Turbo, but with a different body trim (1981–1983).
- 1800 GSR Turbo Intercooler – Intercooler version of the first turbo version, producing 160 PS (118 kW) and with cosmetic changes (1983–1987).
- 1800 GT Turbo Intercooler – Same as the GSR Turbo Intercooler, again with different body trim (1983–1987).
- 1800 GSL Turbo – Same as the GSR Turbo Intercooler, only it used the engine from the GSR/GT Turbo, and equipped with a three-speed automatic transmission, and with a more luxurious interior along with an AM/FM multi-cassette stereo system (1983–1987).

=== Engines ===
Power rating:
JIS (gross) = Japanese market
DIN (net) = Export market

4G63T

- ECI turbocharged SOHC 1997 cc inline-four, 170 PS (168 hp; 125 kW) & 245 N⋅m (181 lb⋅ft; 25 kg⋅m) (DIN)

G62BT

- ECI turbocharged with intercooler "MCA-Jet" SOHC 1795 cc inline-four, 160 PS (158 hp; 118 kW) & 220 N⋅m (162 lb⋅ft; 22 kg⋅m) (JIS)
- ECI turbocharged "MCA-Jet" SOHC 1795 cc inline-four, 135 PS (133 hp; 99 kW) & 200 N⋅m (148 lb⋅ft; 20 kg⋅m) (JIS)

G62B

- Carburetor "MCA-Jet" SOHC 1795 cc inline-four, 100 PS (99 hp; 74 kW) & 147 N⋅m (108 lb⋅ft; 15 kg⋅m) (JIS)

G32B

- Carburetor "MCA-Jet" SOHC 1597 cc inline-four, 86–88 PS (85–87 hp; 63–65 kW) & 132–135 N⋅m (97–100 lb⋅ft; 13–14 kg⋅m) (JIS)

4G32

- Carburetor SOHC 1597 cc inline-four high compression (9.5:1), 82–84 PS (81–83 hp; 60–62 kW) & 116–120 N⋅m (86–89 lb⋅ft; 12–12 kg⋅m) (DIN)
- Carburetor SOHC 1597 cc inline-four low compression (8.5:1), 75 PS (74 hp; 55 kW) & 116 N⋅m (86 lb⋅ft; 12 kg⋅m) (DIN)

4G33

- Carburetor SOHC 1439 cc inline-four, 88 PS (87 hp; 65 kW) & 112 N⋅m (83 lb⋅ft; 11 kg⋅m) (JIS) / 70 PS (69 hp; 51 kW) & 104 N⋅m (77 lb⋅ft; 11 kg⋅m) (DIN)

G12B

- Carburetor "MCA-Jet" SOHC 1410 cc inline-four, 82 PS (81 hp; 60 kW) & 121 N⋅m (89 lb⋅ft; 12 kg⋅m) (JIS)

4G12

- Carburetor SOHC 1410 cc inline-four, 68 PS (67 hp; 50 kW) & 105 N⋅m (77 lb⋅ft; 11 kg⋅m) (DIN)

G11B

- Carburetor "MCA-Jet" SOHC 1244 cc inline-four, 72 PS (71 hp; 53 kW) & 107 N⋅m (79 lb⋅ft; 11 kg⋅m) (JIS)

4G11

- Carburetor SOHC 1244 cc inline-four, 54 PS (53 hp; 40 kW) & 90 N⋅m (66 lb⋅ft; 9 kg⋅m) (DIN)

== Third to seventh generations (1982–2003: Mirage-based Lancers) ==
Between 1982 and 2003, the Lancer was derived from the subcompact front-wheel-drive Mirage. In Japan, the Mirage was sold through the Car Plaza dealership network, while the Lancer was relocated to the Galant Store channel—until both networks merged in 2002. Differences between the two models were minimal, primarily confined to grille designs and trim levels. Although naming conventions varied, for all generations, sedan versions of the Mirage were typically badged as Lancer in export markets, although notably not in the United States.

Mitsubishi had originally launched the Mirage in 1978 as a hatchback—itself sold in many export markets under the name Colt, with a sedan variant later released in 1982. With the launch of the newly established Galant Store, a twin version of the Mirage sedan with minor differences was marketed as "Lancer Fiore". The Fiore suffix was given to differentiate it from the older rear-wheel-drive Lancers which were sold in the same sales channel until 1987. Internationally, the Lancer Fiore often sold under the abbreviated name "Lancer F" (in most European markets, for example). In most regions, the Lancer Fiore featured Mirage-style horizontal grilles; conversely, in Australia and New Zealand, the actual Lancer Fiore (with its distinct honeycomb grille) was sold under the Colt and Mirage nameplates, respectively.

The fourth generation Lancer was launched in 1983 and still marketed with Fiore suffix in Japan. Initially, both models looks too similar to each other, prompting Mitsubishi to issue a facelift featuring revised grille for Mirage. A station wagon/van variant joined the lineup in 1985 to replace the original 1973 model–available until 1992. In Indonesia, both the sedan and five-door hatchback were unique in sharing the "Lancer FF" badge, whereas most export markets received the hatchback as the Colt (with a grille from Lancer). Meanwhile, New Zealand continued marketing the Lancer as the Mirage sedan, and the United States began receiving Mirage-badged Lancers from the 1987 through 2002 model years.

The third-generation Mirage debuted in Japan in 1987, followed in 1988 by the fifth generation Lancer, which was sold locally only as a five-door liftback and dropped the Fiore suffix–sold until 1996 in Australia and New Zealand. In export markets, however, the sedan retained the Lancer nameplate. In Australia, the hatchback was badged as a Lancer because the original Mirage (sold there as the Colt) remained on sale until 1990.

Developed during the peak of Japan's bubble economy, the sixth generation Lancer, launched in 1991, marked a departure from previous iterations. It still shared a platform with the Mirage sedan but featured distinct sheet metal, making it the first standalone Lancer design since the second generation. Most visibly, the Lancer utilized a conventional four-window greenhouse configuration, contrasting with the Mirage’s six-window layout. A station wagon/van variant introduced in 1992 was exported as the Lancer Wagon and sold in Japan as the Libero until 2003. This generation also spawned the high-performance Lancer Evolution I, II, and III for rally homologation. In Australia, the Mirage Asti coupé was badged and sold under the Lancer name.

Introduced in 1995, the sevent generation reverted to a cost-saving rebadge of the Mirage sedan with minor cosmetic tweaks, following the collapse of the Japanese asset bubble. Despite these cost reductions, the model spawned three World Rally Championship-winning iterations: the Lancer Evolution IV, V, and VI. Australia and the Philippines both marketed the Mirage Asti coupé under the Lancer badge. Domestic Japanese production of this generation ended in 2003, though local production under the Lancer name continued in China until 2016.

Mitsubishi introduced replacements for the Mirage starting in 2000, the Mirage Dingo, and a new generation of Lancer sedan—marketed as "Lancer Cedia" and now moved up to the compact segment. Then in 2002, a subcompact five-door hatchback badged Colt (Z30) internationally became available, thus substituting the Mirage-based Colt hatchback. By 2003, the Mirage had been completely phased out of mainstream Japanese production (though it was revived in 2012) and Lancer became the primary title for Mitsubishi's compact offerings.

=== Gallery ===
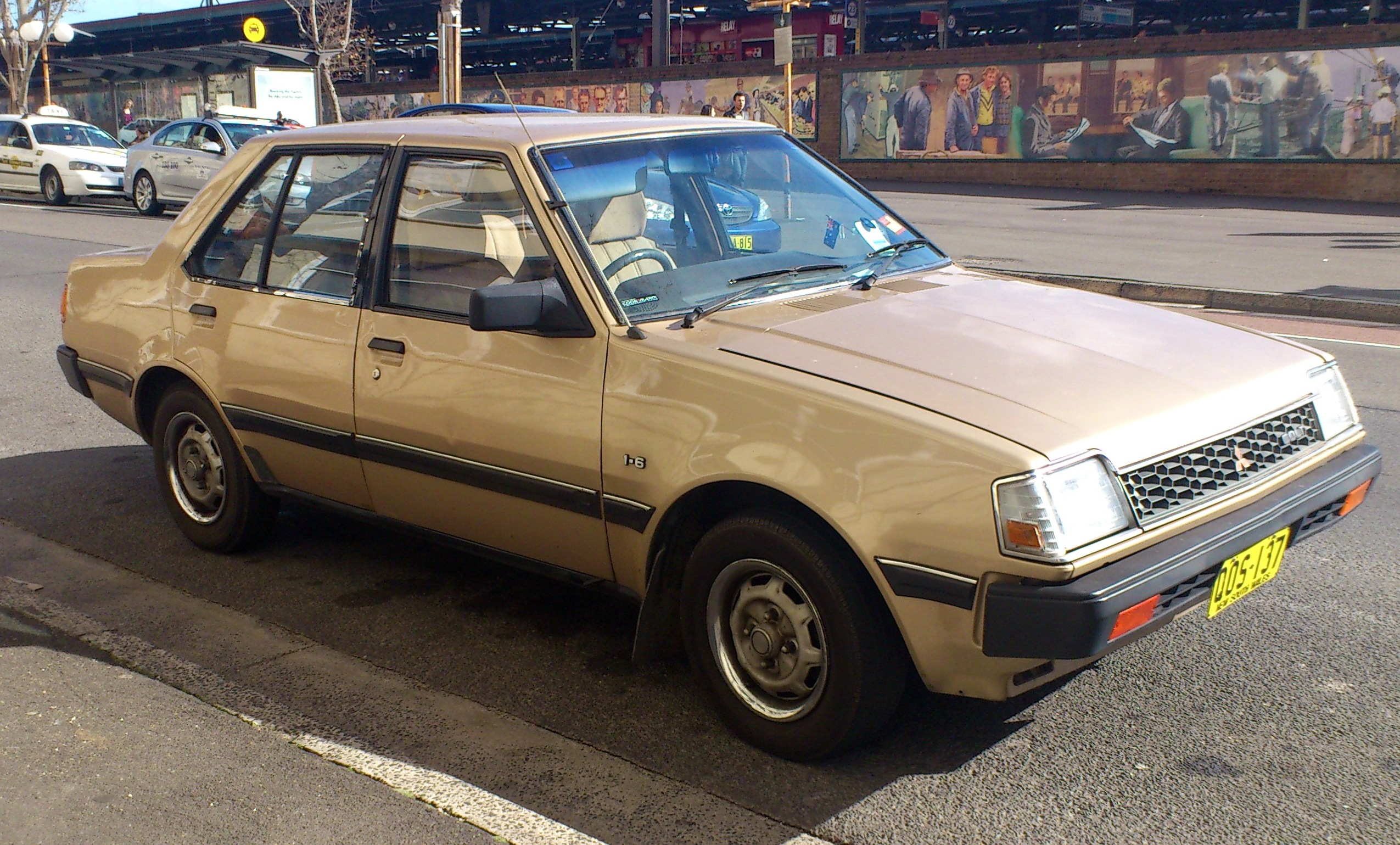
1982–1983

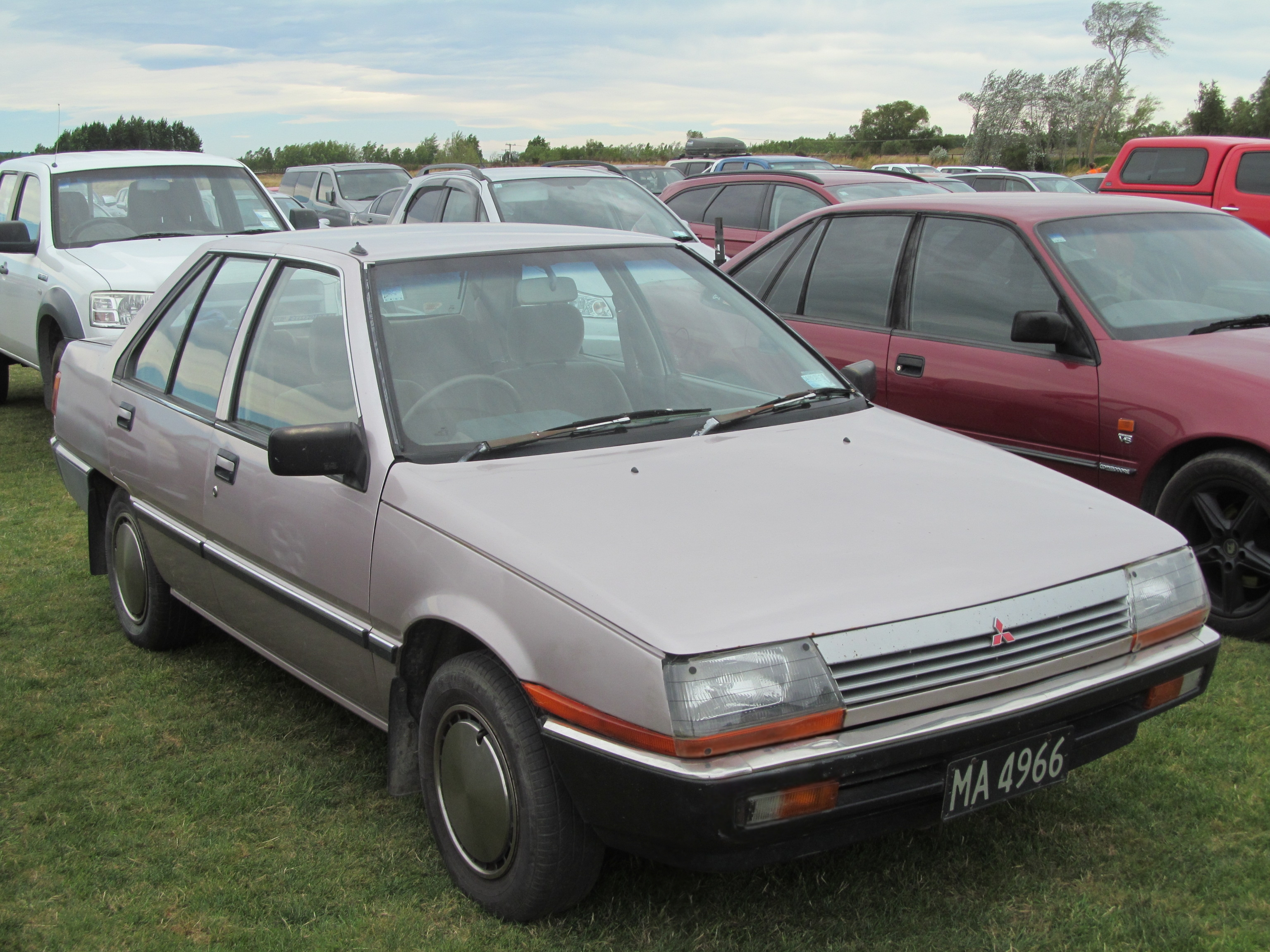
1983–1988

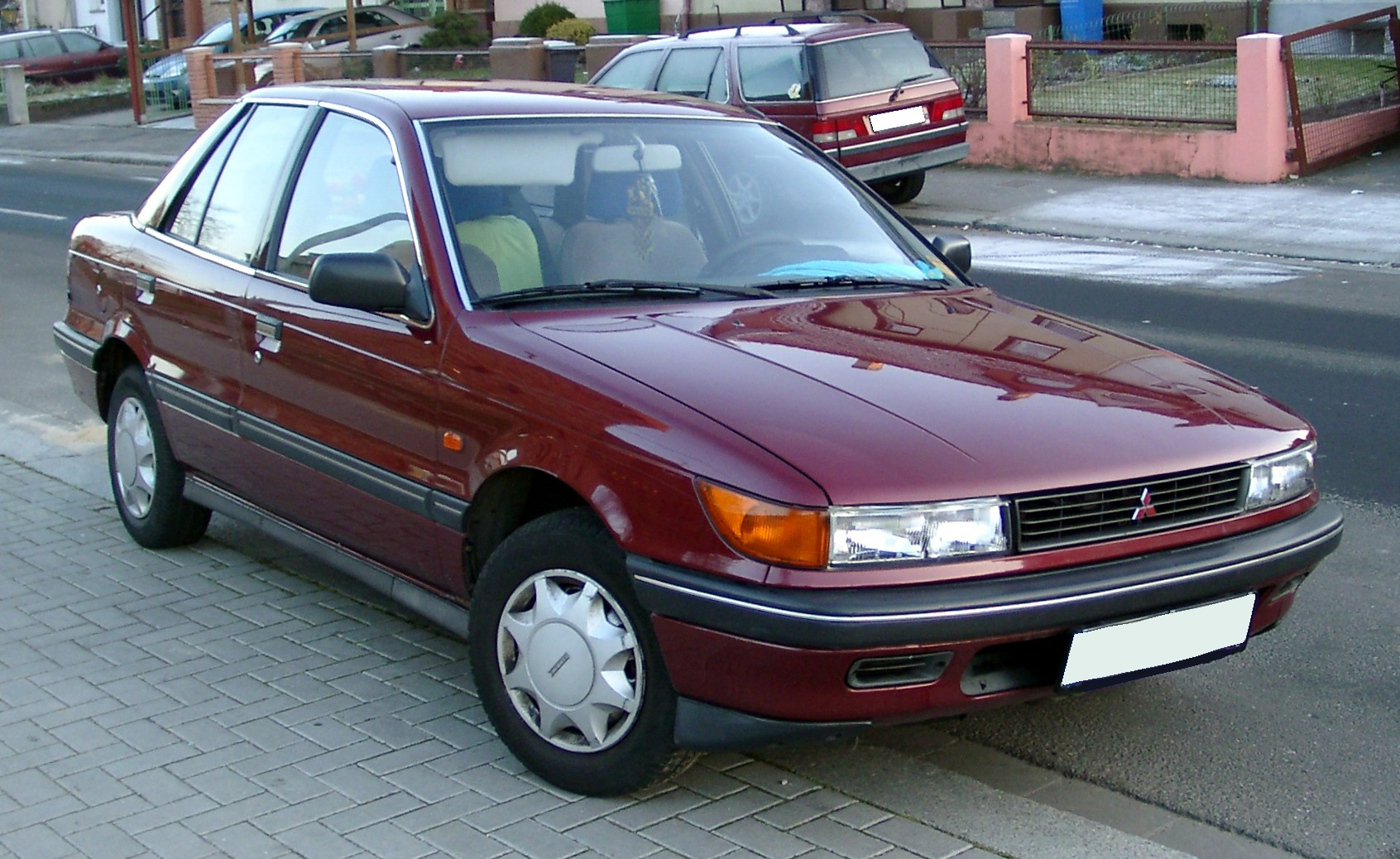
1988–1991

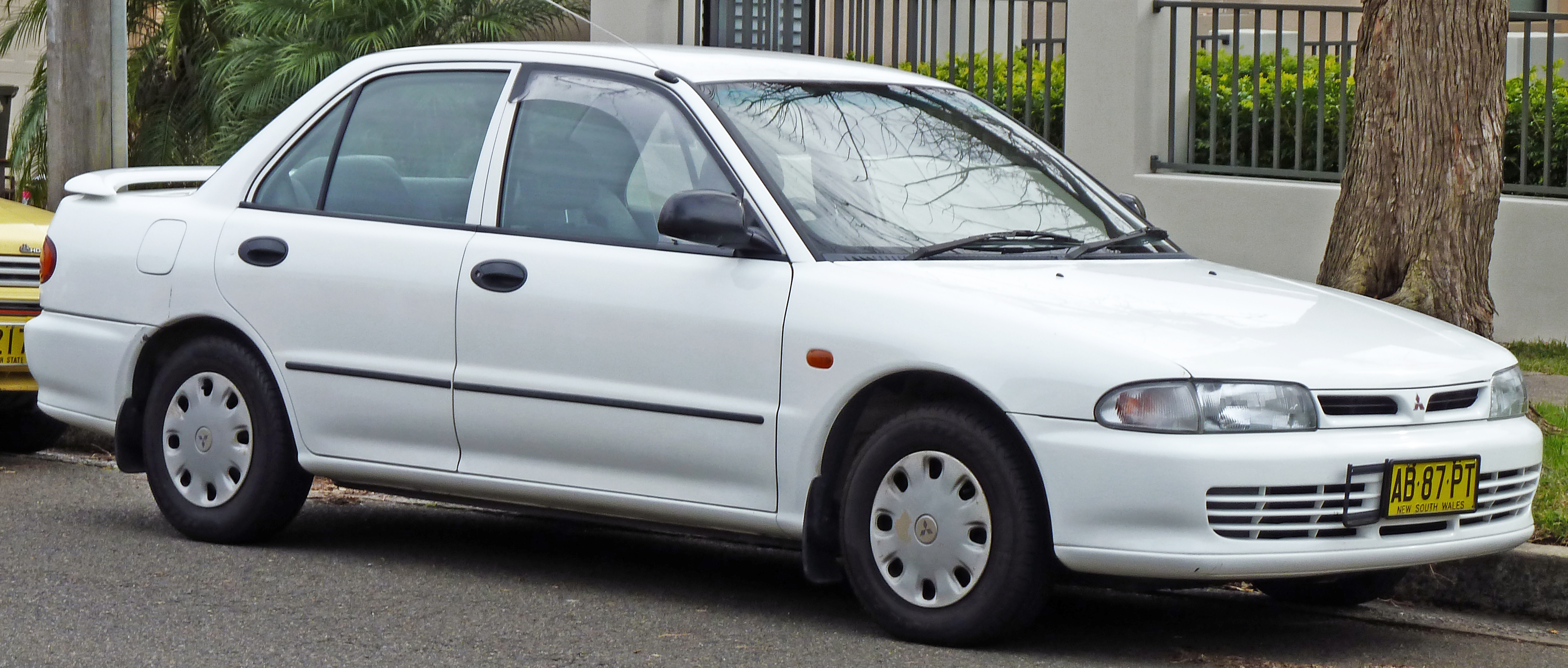
1991–1995

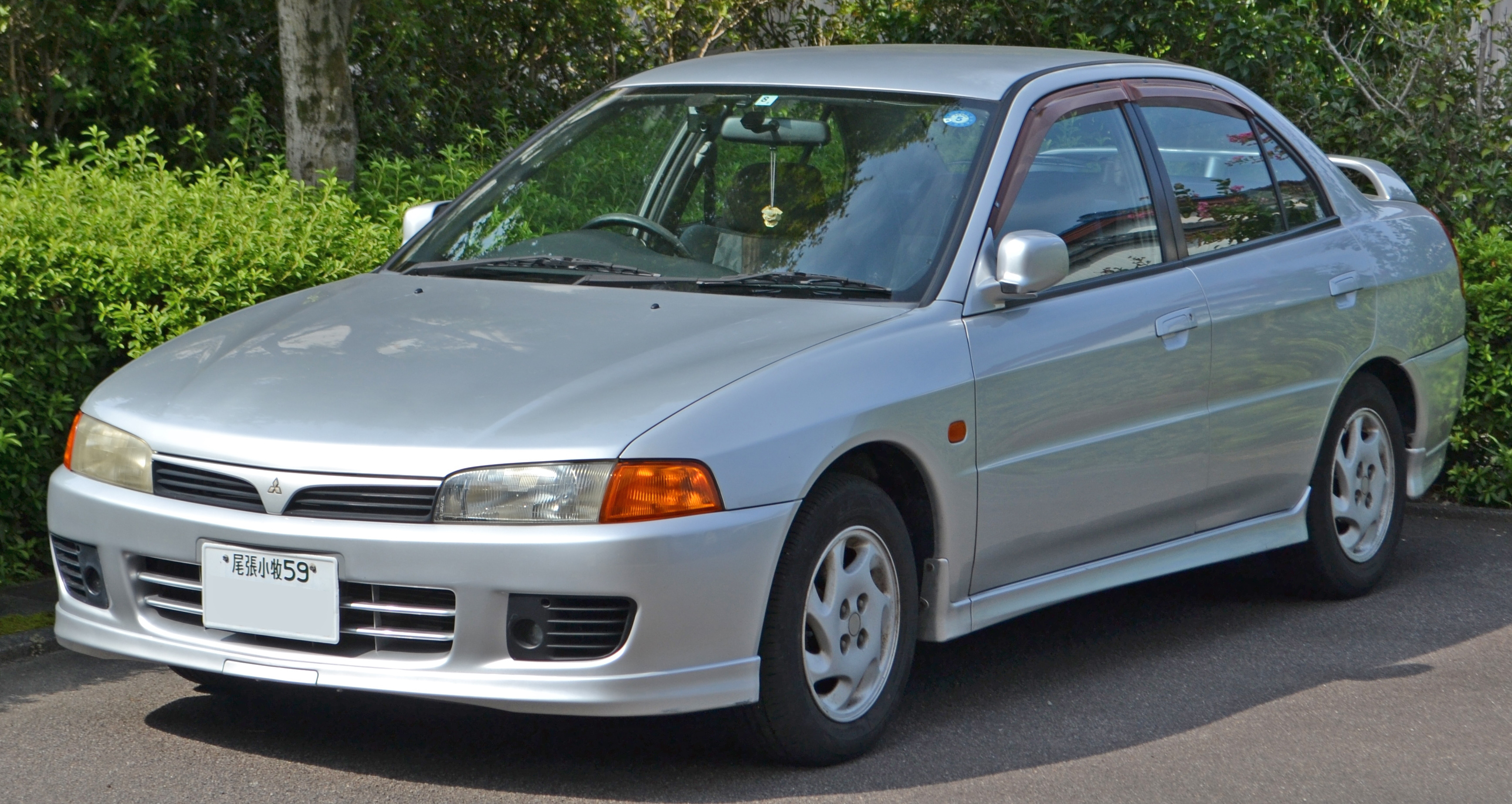
1995–2003

== Eighth generation (2000) ==
Eighth generation
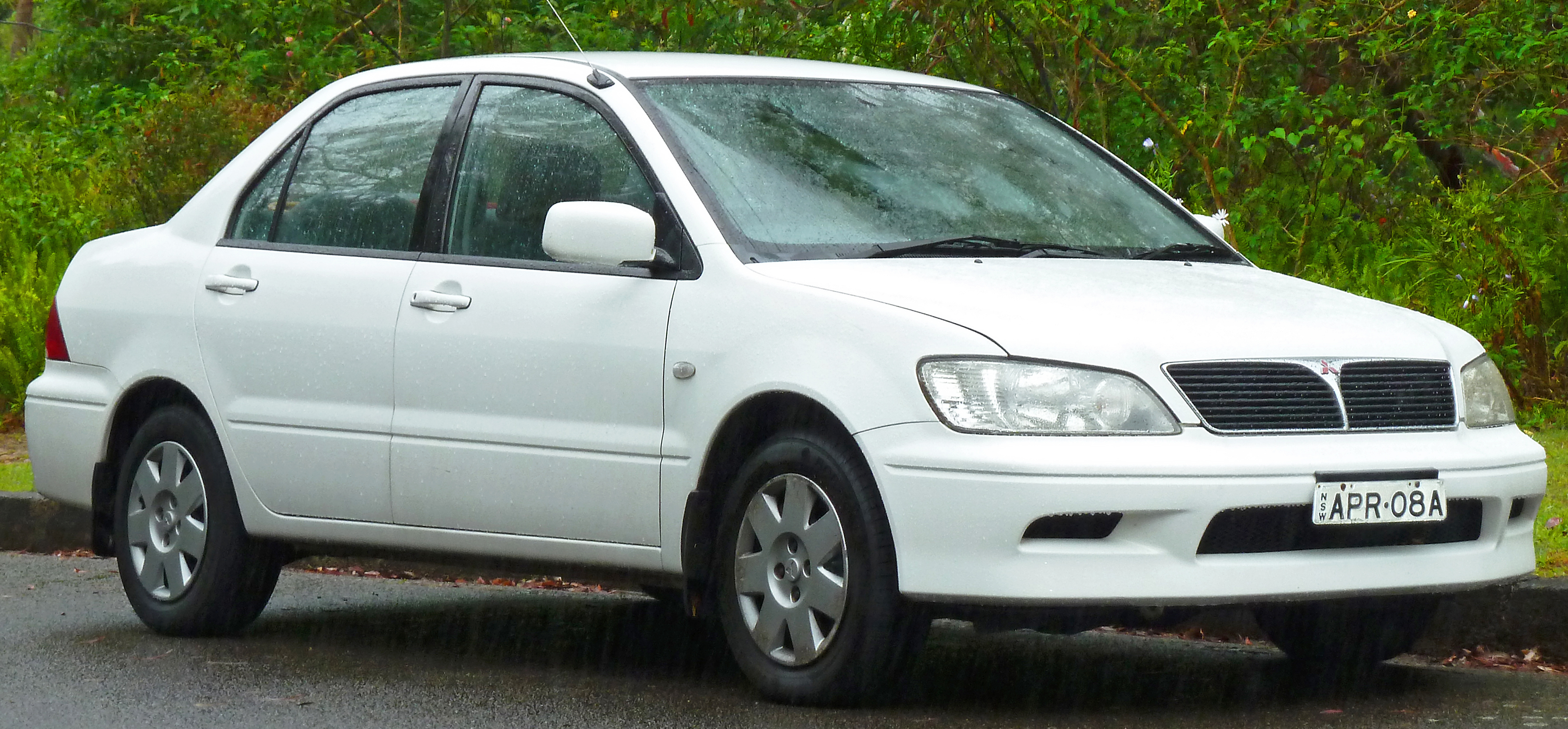
- Mitsubishi Lancer LS sedan (Australia; pre-facelift)

Overview
- Also called: Mitsubishi Cedia; Mitsubishi Lancer Cedia (Japan, Philippines, India & Thailand); Mitsubishi Virage (Taiwan); Soueast Lioncel II; Mitsubishi Lancer Gala (Vietnam); Mitsubishi Lancer GLX-I (Venezuela); Lancer Makwa (MENA, pre-facelift); Lancer Puma (MENA, facelift)
- Production: 2000–2010 (Japan); 2002–2012 (Indonesia, Philippines, Thailand); 2006–2013 (India); 2000–2007 (US); 2002–2015 (Venezuela)
- Assembly: Japan: Okazaki (Nagoya Plant); India: Tiruvallur (Hindustan); Indonesia: Pademangan, North Jakarta (PT. Krama Yudha Kesuma Motor: until June 2005); Philippines: Cainta (2008–2012); China: Fuzhou (Soueast); Taiwan: Yangmei (China Motor); Thailand: Laem Chabang (MMTh); Malaysia: Shah Alam, Selangor; Venezuela: Barcelona (MMC Automotriz); Vietnam: Dĩ An, Bình Dương (Vinastar)
- Designer: Shuzo Akamine (1997)

Body and chassis
- Body style: 4-door sedan 5-door station wagon
- Layout: Front-engine, front-wheel-drive
- Platform: CS2A–CS9W
- Related: Mitsubishi Lancer Evolution VII; Mitsubishi Lancer Evolution VIII; Mitsubishi Lancer Evolution IX; Hafei Saibao III

Powertrain
- Engine: Gasoline: 1.3 L 4G13 I4; 1.5 L 4G15 I4; 1.6 L 4G18 I4; 1.8 L 4G93 I4; 1.8 L 4G93T turbo I4; 2.0 L 4G94 I4; 2.0 L 4G63 I4; 2.4 L 4G69 I4
- Transmission: 5-speed manual 4-speed automatic 4-speed INVECS-II automatic CVT automatic (INVECS-III)

Dimensions
- Wheelbase: 2,600 mm (102.4 in)
- Length: 4,495–4,605 mm (177.0–181.3 in)
- Width: 1,695 mm (66.7 in)
- Height: 1,375–1,425 mm (54.1–56.1 in)
- Curb weight: 1,399 kg (3,084 lb)

May 2000 saw the release in Japan of the Lancer Cedia (meaning CEntury DIAmond), though in most markets the previous 1995 vintage Mirage-based Lancer soldiered on for a while longer, production continuing at Mitsubishi's Mizushima plant in Japan. The new model was available in sedan and station wagon forms. In Europe, the Lancer was not offered in some countries, being too close to the size of the Dutch-built Mitsubishi Carisma, so the Evolution VII model sold there bore the Carisma name. This series of Lancer was still sold in Japan for 3 years alongside the 2007 onwards generation Lancer, sold there as the "Galant Fortis".

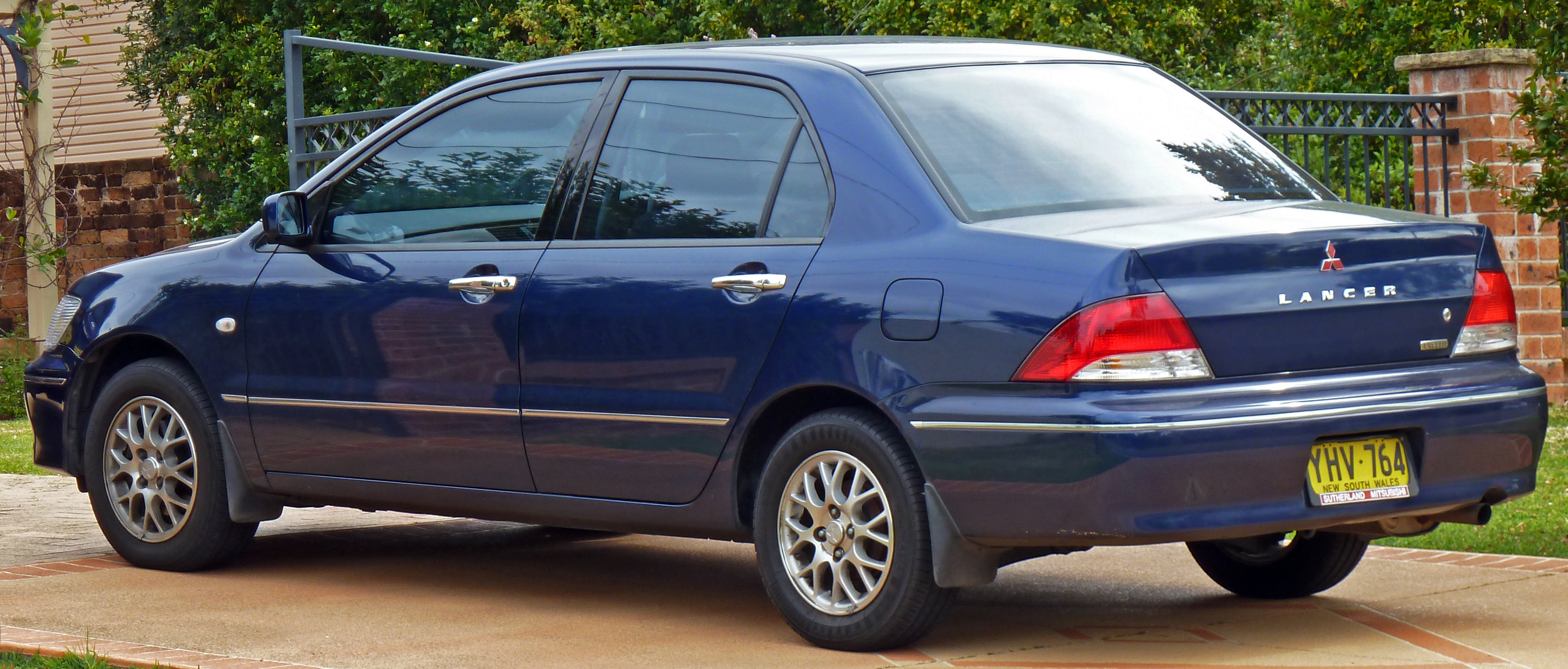
Lancer Exceed sedan (Australia; pre-facelift)

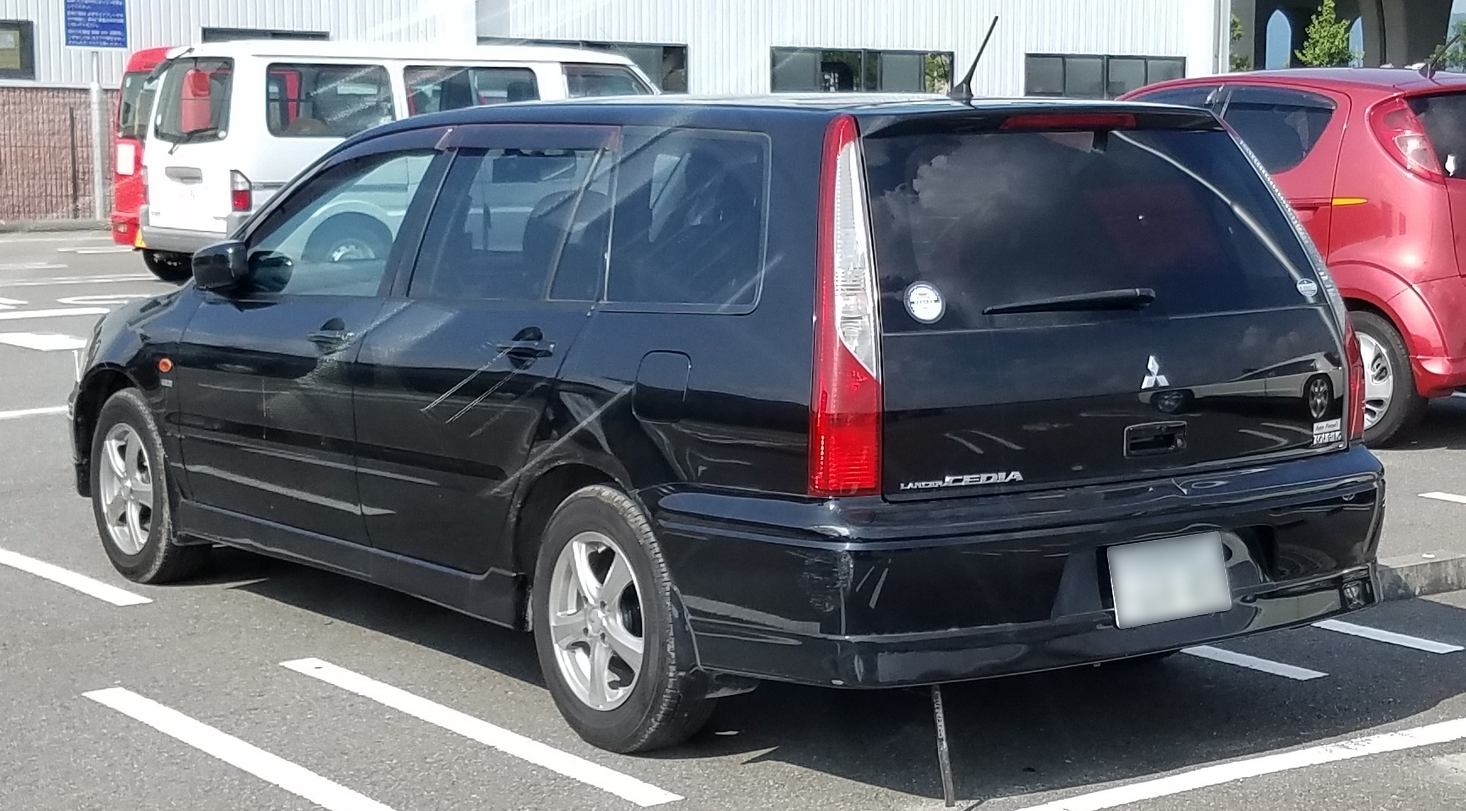
Estate/station wagon (Japan; pre-facelift)

In February 2003, for the 2004 model year, a heavily restyled Lancer surfaced with a front styling that brought it into line with the Mitsubishi corporate look, as well as a restyled rear, to further differentiate itself from the Lancer Evolution. The car's grille was then redesigned again in 2005 for the 2006 model year.

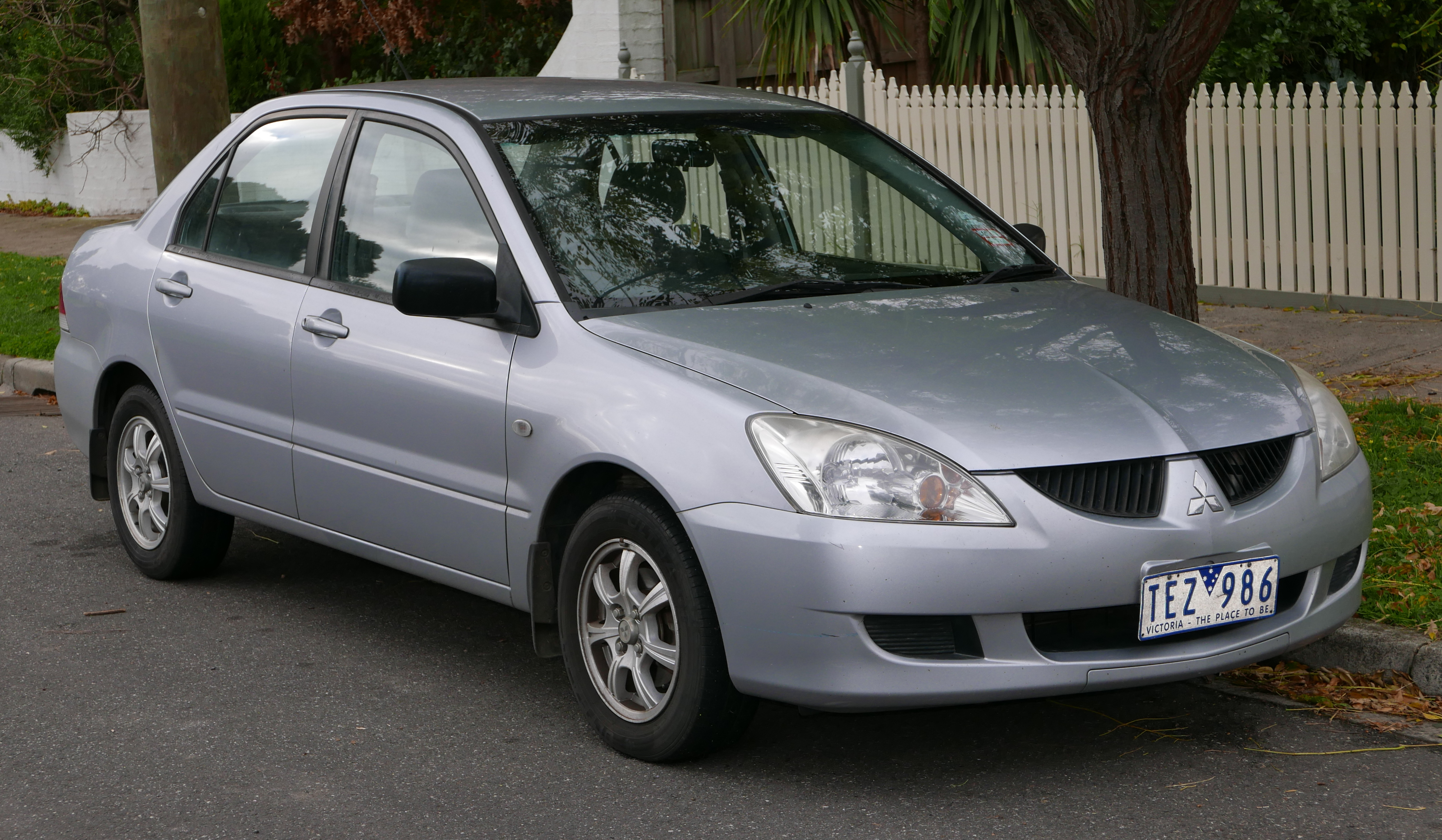
Sedan (facelift)

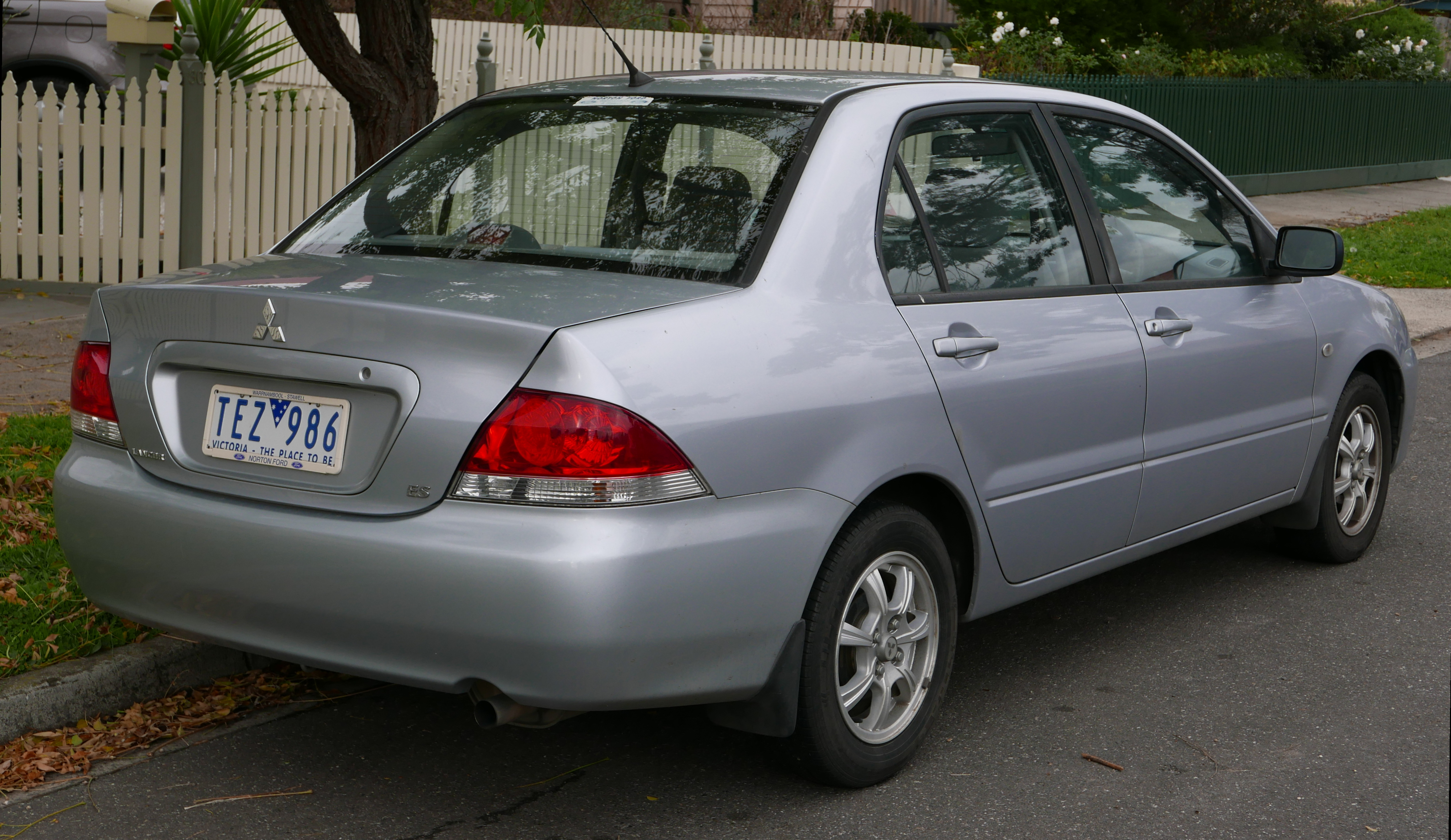
Sedan (facelift)

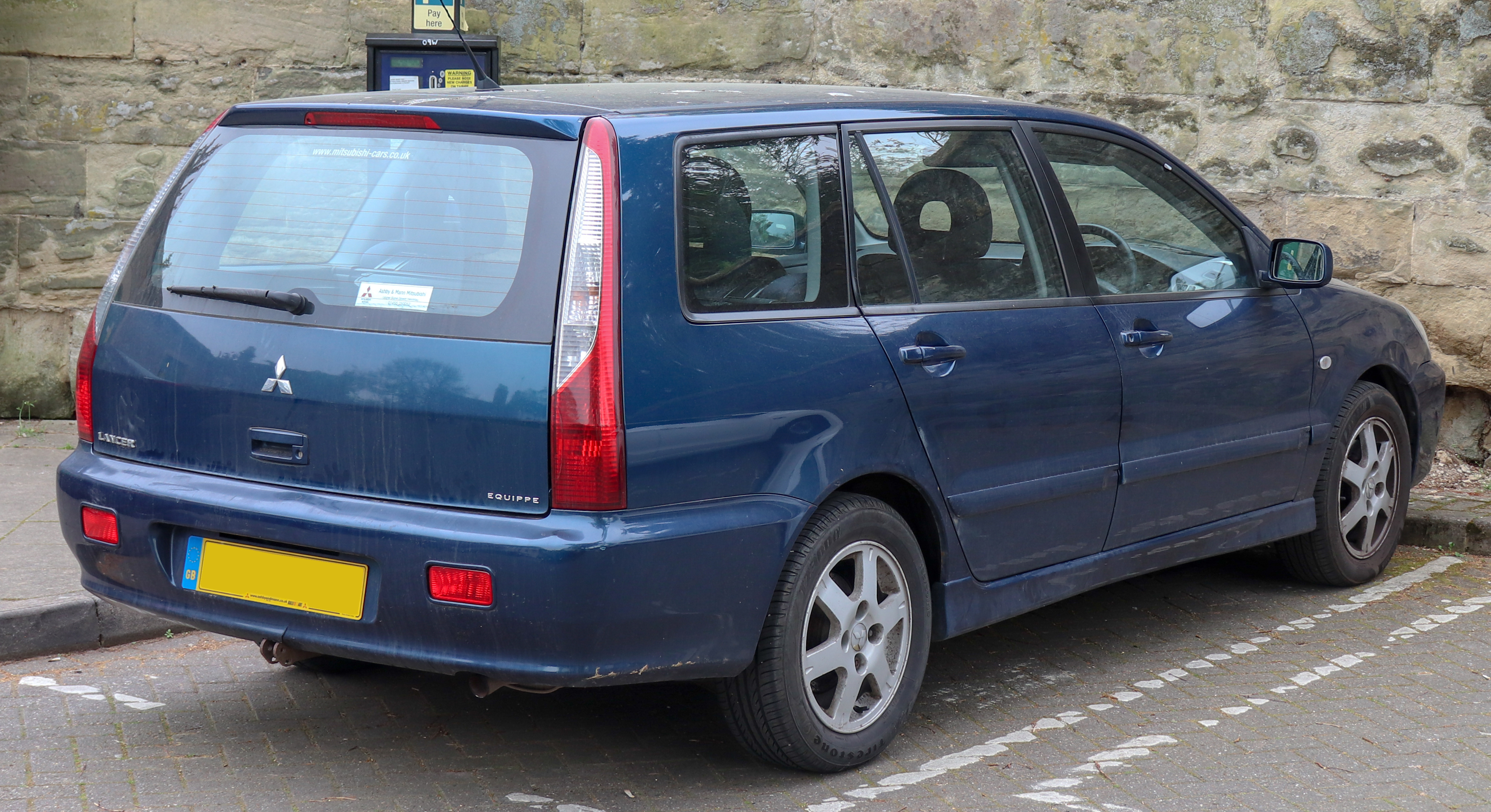
Estate/station wagon (Europe)

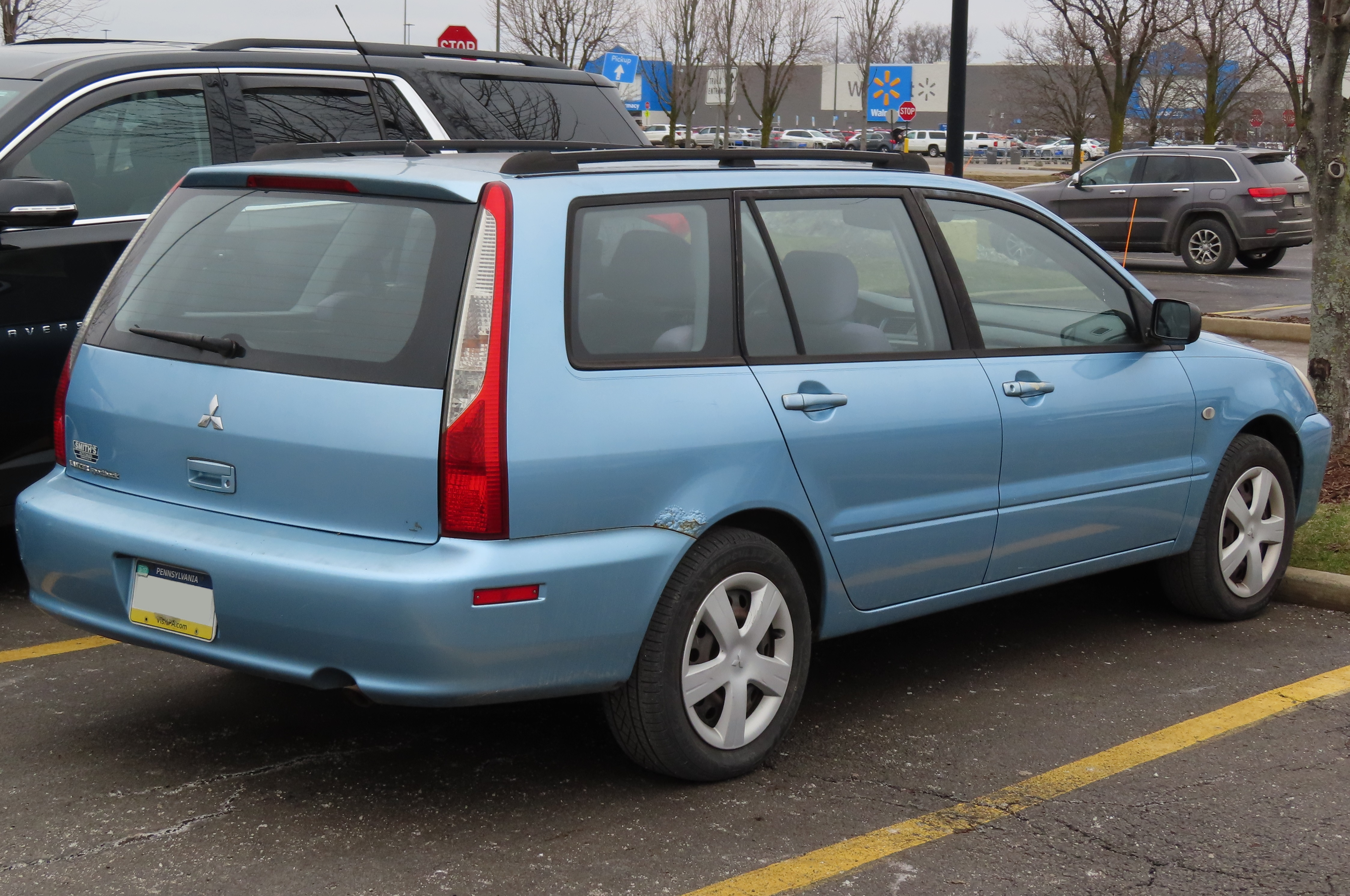
Estate/station wagon (North America)

=== Marketing ===
==== Asia ====
In Japan, the Lancer Cedia was offered with many different trim levels and engines, including some options never exported, such as a cargo variant of the station wagon, which was replaced by a rebranded Nissan AD. It was also one of the first models to use the INVECS-III CVT transmission. There was also a Ralliart version of the Sportswagon which was powered by a turbocharged 1.8-liter GDI engine. Until 2010, it was still sold alongside the 9th generation, known in Japan as the Galant Fortis.

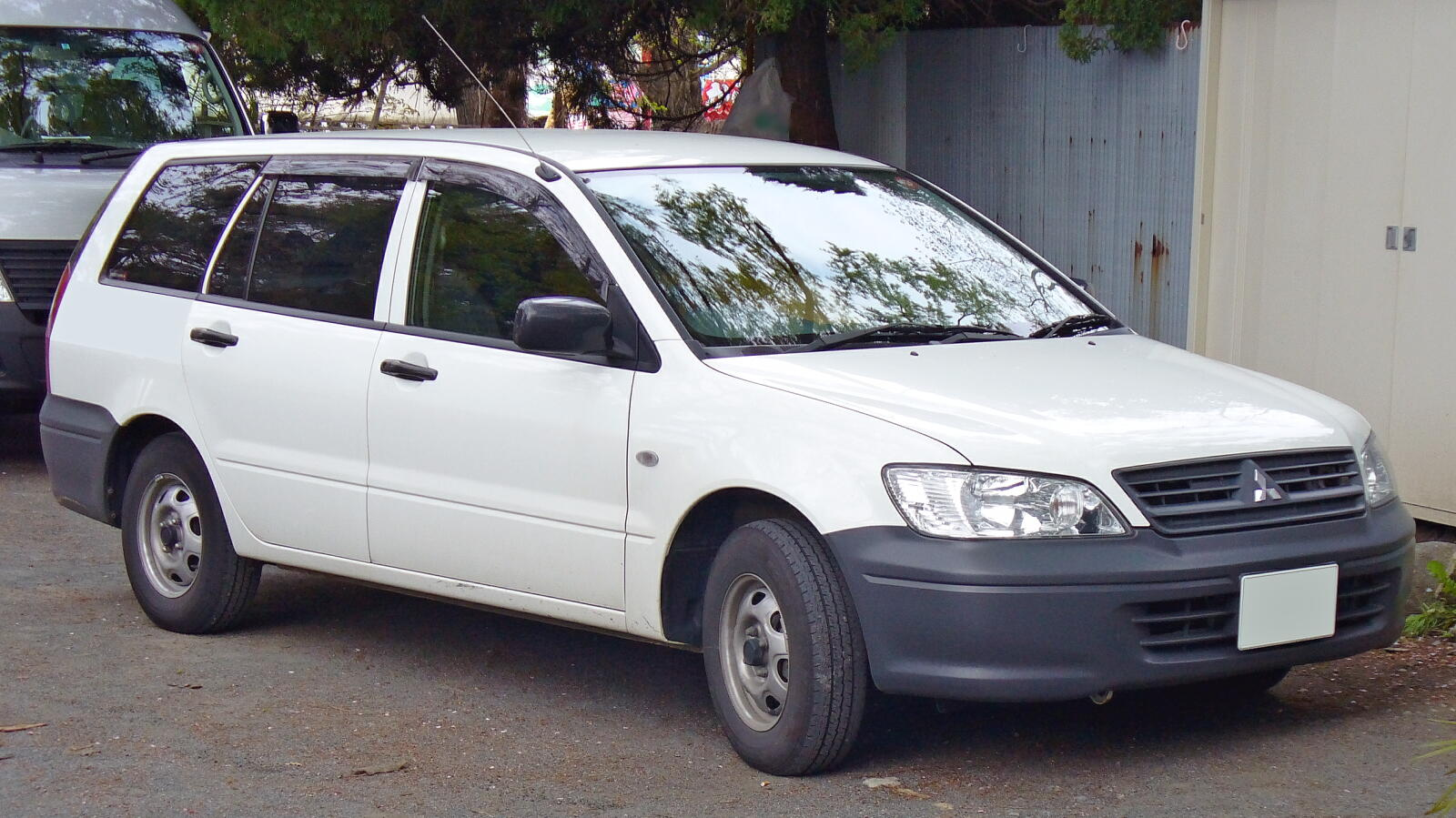
Lancer Cargo (facelift, Japan)

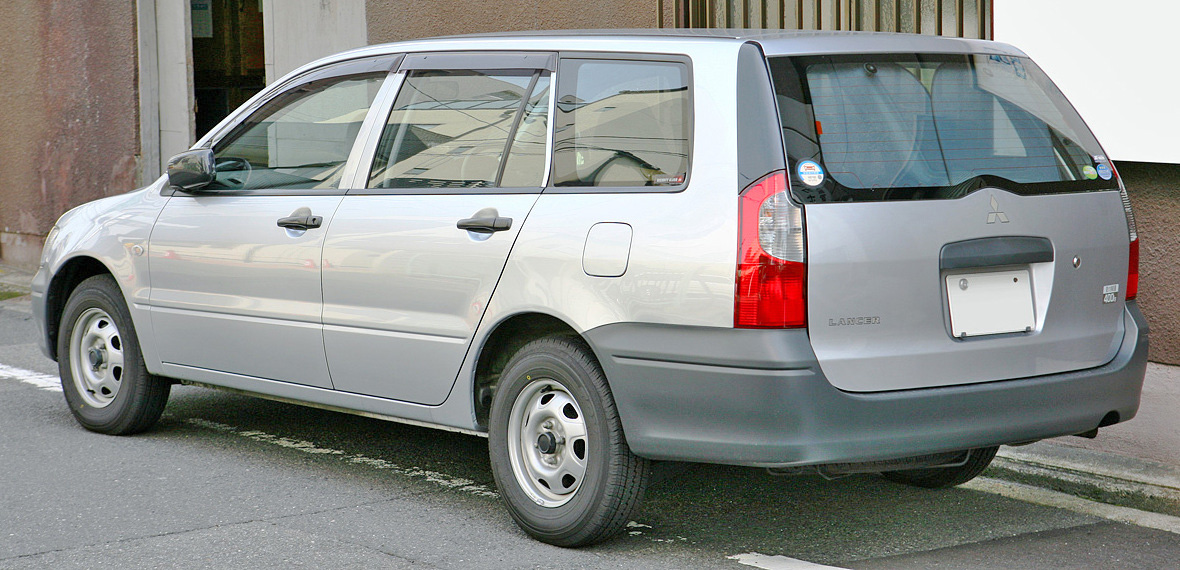
Lancer Cargo (facelift, Japan)

In Taiwan, the Mitsubishi Lancer was produced and marketed by China Motor Corporation, and the car was slightly restyled in the beginning with larger front grilles, extra chrome trims, and the rear license plate located on the trunk lid instead of the rear bumper. Later, following the internationally sold facelift version, the front lamps were restyled and reshaped to be triangular while the tail lamps extended onto the trunk lid which is different from the version sold in other parts of the world. An additional facelift was added again in 2005 with white marker lights in the front replacing the amber ones and restyled tail lamps.

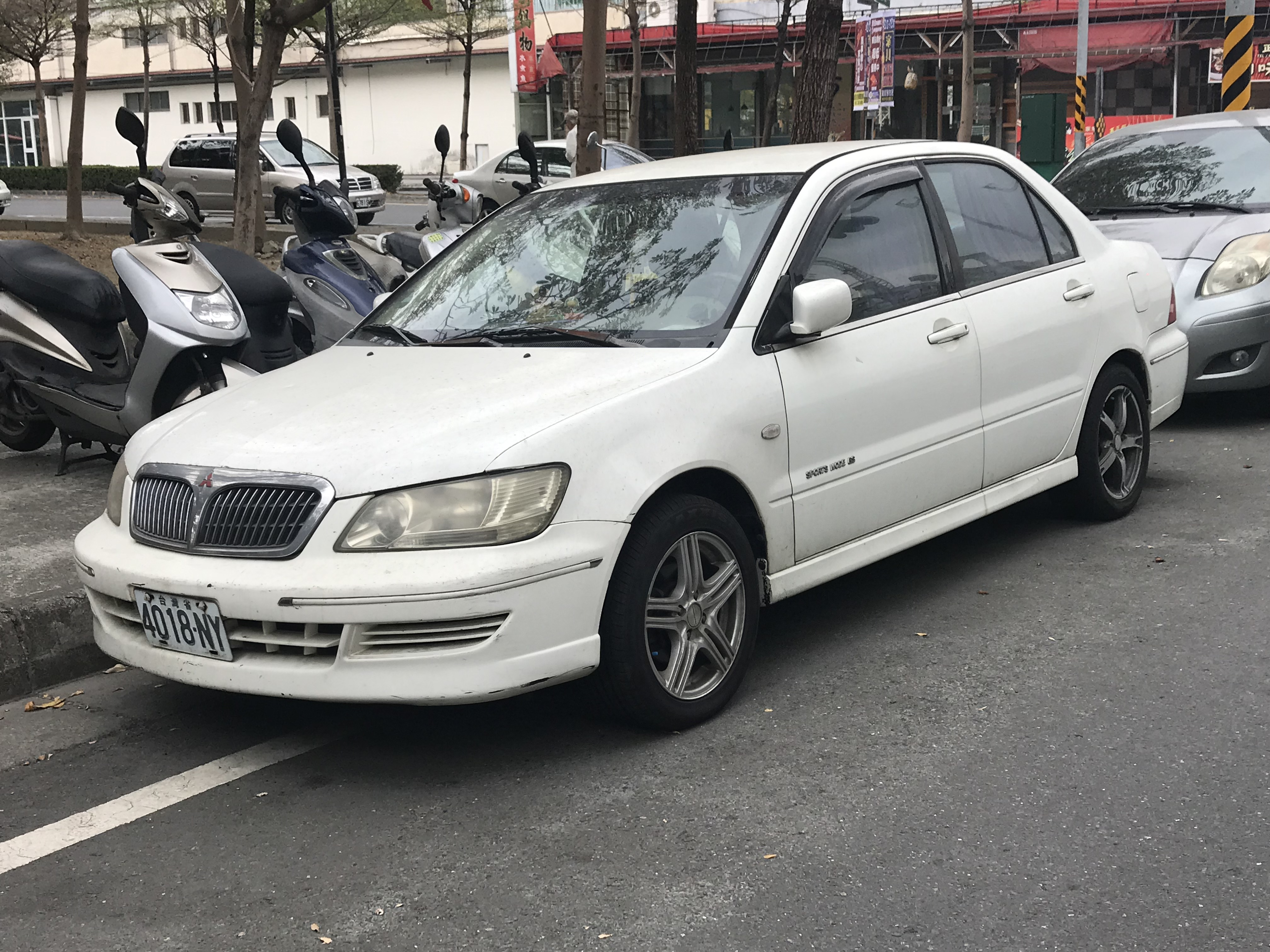
Sedan front (pre-facelift; Taiwanese spec)

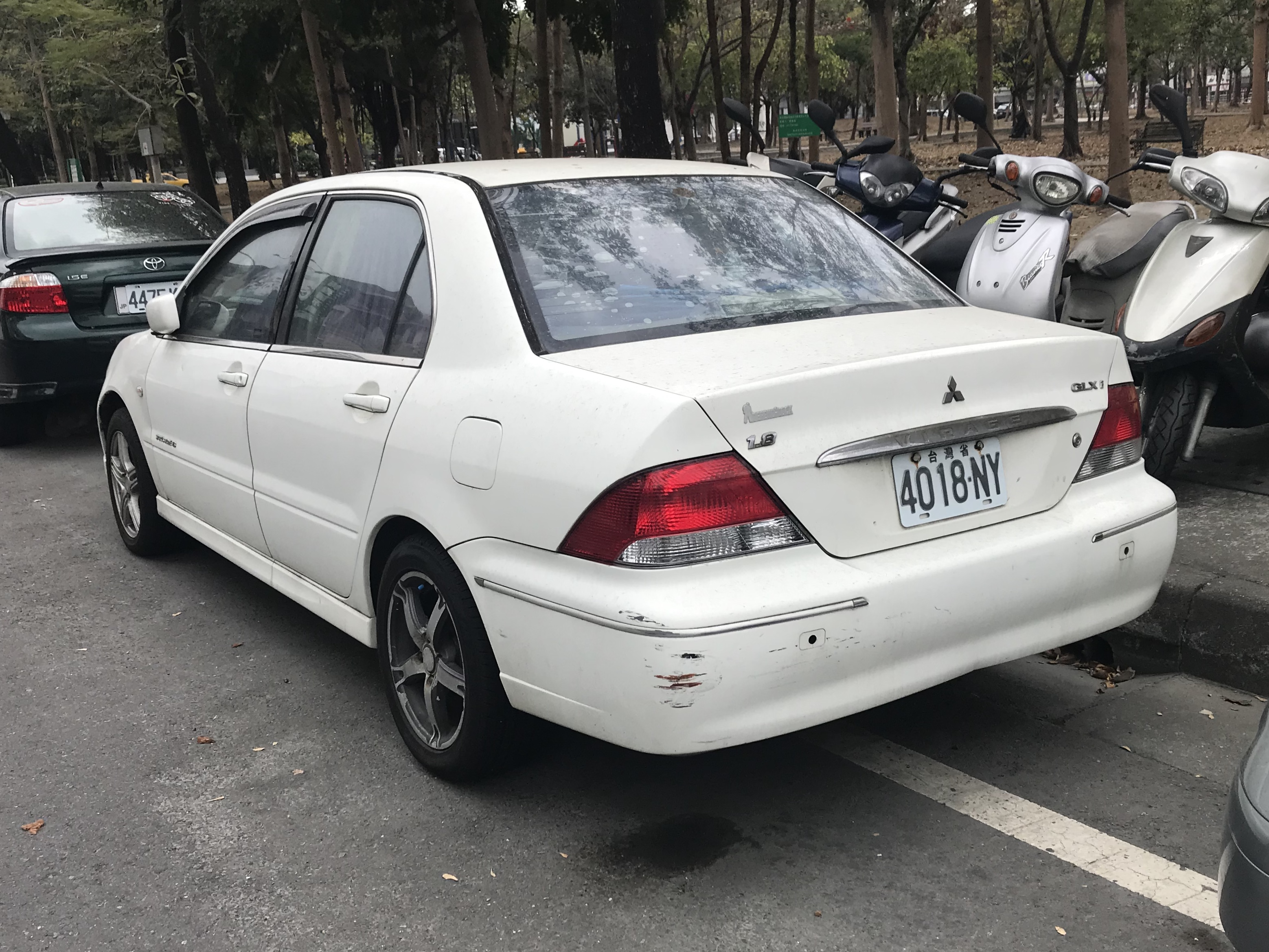
Sedan rear (pre-facelift; Taiwanese spec)

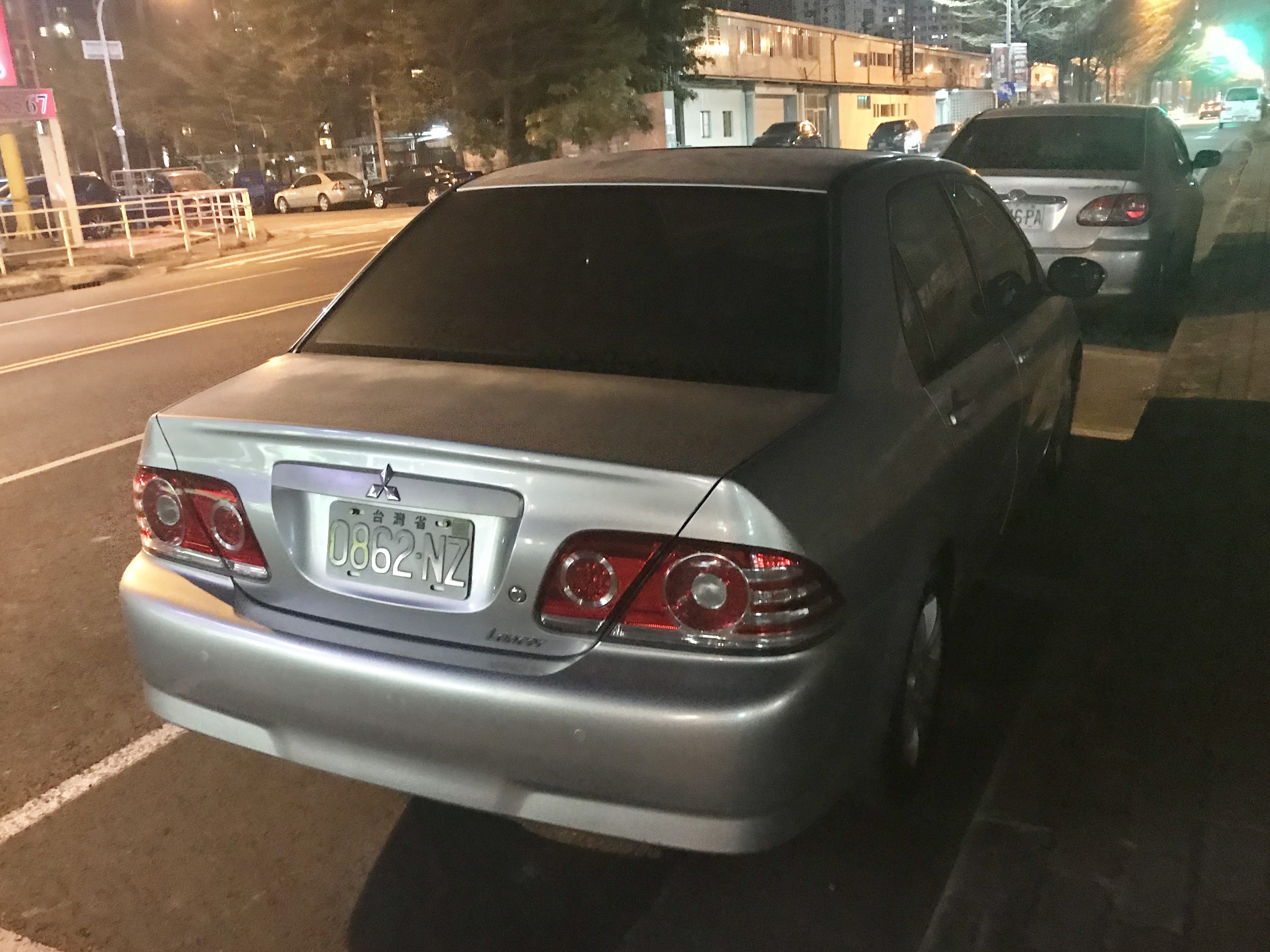
Sedan rear (facelift; Taiwanese spec)

In Indonesia, the Lancer was available in GLXi and SEi trims. It was assembled locally and sold from 2002 until 2012.

In Malaysia, the Lancer was made available after Mitsubishi had sold all its shares in Malaysian carmaker Proton, marking the return of Mitsubishi in the Malaysian market after being absent since 1985 due to the agreement with Proton. The Lancer sold in Malaysia was powered by the 4G18 engine which also powered the early 1.6-liter Proton Waja model.

In the Philippines, the eighth-generation Lancer Cedia was launched in 2003, sourced from Mitsubishi's Thailand plant until 2008, with 2008 to 2012 models assembled in Mitsubishi's production plant in Cainta, Rizal. Grade levels were include; the GLX, GLS and MX. Both GLX and GLS were powered with a 1.6-litre 4G18 SOHC engine, making with 110 PS (81 kW). The MX was powered with a 1.8-litre 4G93 SOHC engine. Transmission choices were a 5-speed manual (for GLX and GLS) or 4-speed INVECS-III CVT (for GLS and MX). The refreshed Lancer was introduced between 2005 and 2007 with the same 3 grades, while the GLS with manual transmission has been discontinued. During 2007, Mitsubishi Philippines also marketed both GT and GSR grades. Both were powered with a 2.0-litre 4G63 engines and mated with a 4-speed INVECS-II CVT transmissions. The only differences between that the GT received semi-bucket seats and a Momo steering wheel, while the GSR had leather seats and only came in Glaire Beige (champagne). In 2008, another facelift version was introduced and the MX, GT and GSR grades were removed from the lineup. It was only offered in 2 grades were available; the GLX with a 5-speed manual transmission and GLS with an INVECS-III CVT transmission and foglights. Both were powered with a 1.6-litre 4G18 engines.

In Pakistan, this variant was launched in 2005 with cosmetic changes from the front and the back. Thai production was switched to the new model, and in all markets except for India the previous model was no longer marketed, four years after the Cedia's introduction. In India, it was first introduced at the 2006 Auto Expo in New Delhi as the Lancer Cedia, complementing the lower-priced Lancer. All Lancer variants were built by Mitsubishi's Indian partner Hindustan Motors. From 2009 on, it was sold under the Cedia name alone, available as the Cedia Select and the Cedia Sports. In order to comply with the emissions regulations and to accommodate lower quality petrol, it used a slightly detuned version of the SOHC 16-valve 4G94 found on the Lancer, having 115 PS (85 kW; 113 hp) at 5250 rpm and 175 N⋅m (129 lb⋅ft) at 4250 rpm. The Cedia, a rather expensive car for Indian conditions, was discontinued without a direct successor in June 2013 as Mitsubishi India chose to focus on SUVs. Production was reported to have ended in November 2012.

==== Australia ====
In Australia, this series of Lancer was introduced as the CG series in July 2002 with the 2.0-liter 4G94 engine. The 2003 facelift, designated the CH series, introduced a heavily updated VR-X, which included new 16" alloys, stiffer suspension, body styling kit, and gear shifter borrowed from the Lancer Evolution. In 2004, the new Lancer wagon was introduced as a direct replacement for its ageing circa 1992 predecessor.

In August 2005, all Lancers were upgraded to the 2.4-liter 4G69 engine, producing 115 kW (154 hp) and 220 N⋅m (162 lb⋅ft) of torque. The upgraded engine also saw a change in trim levels and upgraded equipment—the ES and LS models now featured a more upmarket looking black interior, while the VR-X gained a new black grille to closer resemble the Lancer Evolution IX. The equipment levels of all models were also upgraded, with the LS and VR-X gaining climate control, and a premium audio system sourced from the luxury Mitsubishi Verada. The Exceed model was discontinued, and all updated models now used JDM sized rear bumpers instead of the larger USDM sized versions. Additionally, the wagon also saw these changes; and as of 2007, continues to be sold alongside the sedan.

The ES and LS models were given a minor facelift for the 2007 model year; this time gaining the same front grille as the US models, and putting it into line with the current corporate look—similar to that of the Colt and the locally built 380. A limited edition ES model dubbed "Velocity" went on sale prior to this generation being replaced. This package included VR-X grille, rear spoiler, leather/Alcantara bolstered seats, sports pedals, 15-inch alloy wheels and chrome exhaust tip—all for the same price as the previous standard ES.

==== Europe ====
In some European markets, the Lancer began to take the place of the Carisma in 2004. It is powered by a 1.3-liter SOHC 16-valve 4G13 engine producing 82 PS (60 kW) at 5,000 rpm and 120 N⋅m (89 lb⋅ft) of torque at 4,000 rpm. The next engine in the range is the 1.6-liter SOHC 4G18 engine producing 98 PS (72 kW) at 5,000 rpm and 150 N⋅m (111 lb⋅ft) at 4,000 rpm. Finally, there is the 2.0-liter DOHC 4G63 producing 135 PS (99 kW) at 5,750 rpm and 176 N⋅m (130 lb⋅ft) at 4,500 rpm.

==== North America ====
In North America, the Lancer was introduced in 2001 for the 2002 model year as a direct replacement for the Mirage. In the United States, Chrysler had offered an unrelated Dodge Lancer at various stages between the 1950s and 1980s. However, when Daimler, who owned Chrysler at the time, briefly controlled Mitsubishi through the DaimlerChrysler-Mitsubishi alliance from 2000 through to 2004, the rights to the "Lancer" name were relinquished to Mitsubishi for usage in North America. Consequently, after Mitsubishi discontinued the 1995 series Mirage for North America in 2001, the replacement model adopted the Lancer name for the first time. This also allowed Mitsubishi to save themselves the licensing fees to use the "Mirage" name from Grand Touring Cars, Inc., who had the rights to the name for the Mirage race car series.

North American Lancers were powered by a 2.0-liter 4G94 engine producing 120 hp (89 kW) and 130 lb⋅ft (176 N⋅m) of torque. In Mexico, the Lancer sedan was available in DE, ES, LS and GS trims with a 2.0-liter DOHC 4G63 engine.

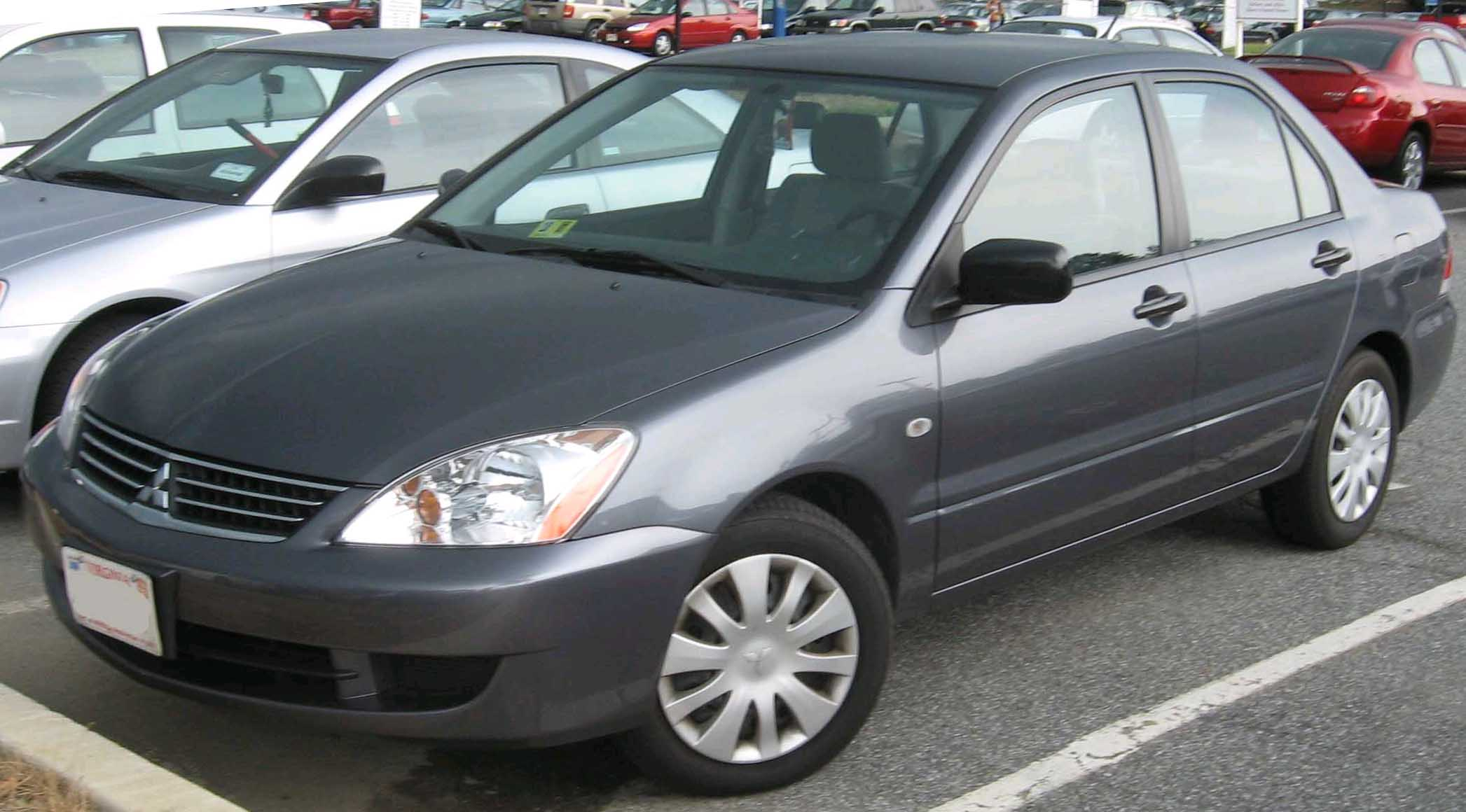
2006 Mitsubishi Lancer ES (North American spec)

In addition to the facelift, North America received three additional models to the Lancer line in 2004—Lancer Ralliart, LS Sportback and Ralliart Sportback. Ralliart slots in between the base models and high-performance Evolution. These cars came equipped with Mitsubishi's 2.4-liter 4G69 engine (rated at 160 hp (119 kW)/ 162 lb⋅ft (220 N⋅m) for the Sportback, and 162 hp (121 kW)/ 162 lb⋅ft (220 N⋅m) for the Ralliart). The power gain was due to a tuned muffler for the Ralliart, and also included a new, stiffer suspension package that improved handling and lowered for Ralliart and lifted the LS Sportback by 2.9 inches. The LS Sportback had 15-inch steel or optional 15-inch alloy wheels. The Ralliart came with 16-inch alloy wheels, front bucket seats borrowed from Japan's Mitsubishi Evolution GT-A, optional fog lamps, and a new aerodynamic ground package for Ralliart. The LS Sportback and Ralliart Sportback were equipped with a four-speed INVECS-II automatic transmission, while the Ralliart came with a five-speed manual transmission with an option for the four-speed automatic.

For the 2006 model year, the fascia was changed again from a bridged fascia to one with an open vent after Mitsubishi received complaints from current owners regarding its similarity in appearance to General Motors Division Pontiac's corporate look, and to bring the appearance closer to its bigger brother, the Evolution.

The Lancer Sportback wagon was cancelled in the United States one year after its release, but the Mitsubishi Lancer wagon was sold in Canada for a while longer.

=== Safety ===
ANCAP test results* Mitsubishi Lancer (2003)
| Test | Score |
|---|---|
| Overall | 3 /5 stars |
| Frontal offset | 10.03/16 |
| Side impact | 10.55/16 |
| Pole | Not Assessed |
| Seat belt reminders | 0/3 |
| Whiplash protection | Not Assessed |
| Pedestrian protection | Marginal |
| Electronic stability control | Not Assessed |

== Ninth generation (2007) ==
Ninth generation
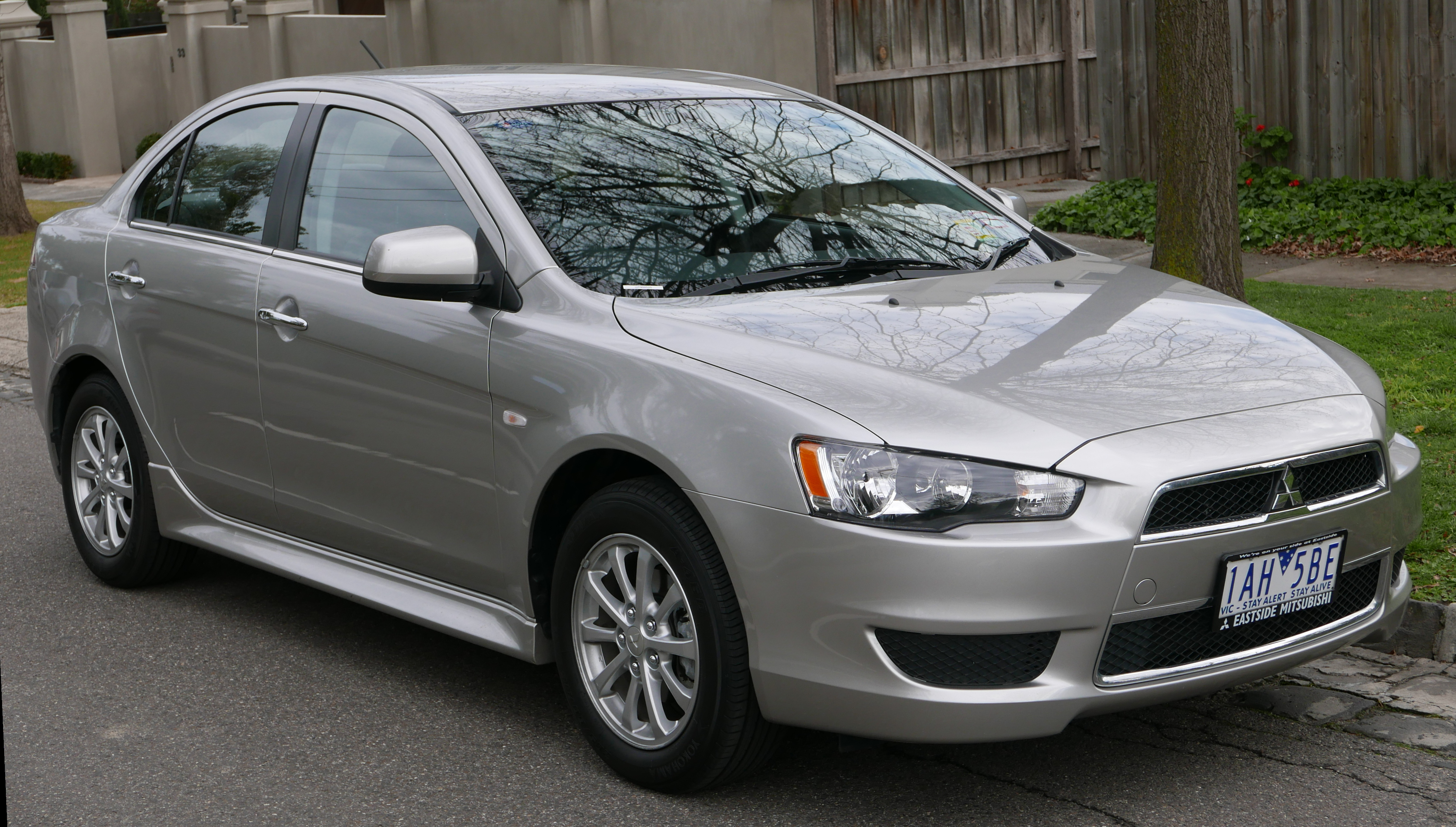
- Mitsubishi Lancer LX sedan (Australia; pre-facelift)

Overview
- Also called: Mitsubishi Galant Fortis (Japan); Mitsubishi Galant; Proton Inspira (Malaysia); Mitsubishi Lancer EX
- Production: 2007–2019
- Model years: 2008–2020
- Assembly: Japan: Kurashiki (Mizushima Plant); Brazil: Catalão (MMC Automotores: 2014–2019); China: Fuzhou (Soueast); Malaysia: Shah Alam, Selangor (Proton); Philippines: Cainta (MMPC: 2008–2014); Taiwan: Yangmei (CMC); Thailand: Laem Chabang (MMTh)
- Designer: Omer Halilhodžić (2004); Norihiko Yoshimine

Body and chassis
- Body style: 4-door sedan 5-door hatchback
- Layout: Front-engine, front-wheel-drive Four-wheel-drive
- Platform: Mitsubishi GS platform
- Related: Mitsubishi Lancer Evolution X; Mitsubishi ASX; Mitsubishi Outlander (second generation); Mitsubishi Outlander (third generation)

Powertrain
- Engine: Gasoline: 1.5 L 4A91 MIVEC I4; 1.6 L 4A92 MIVEC I4; 1.8 L 4B10 MIVEC I4; 1.8 L 4J10 MIVEC I4; 2.0 L 4B11 MIVEC I4; 2.0 L 4B11T MIVEC turbo I4; 2.4 L 4B12 MIVEC I4; Diesel: 1.8 L 4N13 DI-D turbo I4; 2.0 L VW BWC DI-D PD turbo I4
- Transmission: 5-speed manual (1.5, 1.6 gasoline and EVO X models only); 6-speed manual (1.8, 2.0 and 2.4 gasoline and diesel models only); 6-speed Ralliart TC-SST (EVO X models only); 4-speed automatic (INVECS-II, 1.5, 1.6 and 2.0 liters gasoline models only); CVT automatic with 6-speed manual mode or CVT low gear (INVECS-III, 1.8 and 2.4 liters gasoline models only)

Dimensions
- Wheelbase: 2,635 mm (103.7 in)
- Length: Sedan: 4,570 mm (179.9 in); 4,625 mm (182.1 in) (2016 facelift); Sportback: 4,585 mm (180.5 in)
- Width: 1,760 mm (69.3 in)
- Height: Sedan: 1,490 mm (58.7 in); Sportback: 1,515 mm (59.6 in)
- Curb weight: 1,230–1,415 kg (2,712–3,120 lb); 1,570–1,593 kg (3,461–3,512 lb) (Ralliart)

In 2005, Mitsubishi revealed the "Concept X" model car at the Tokyo Motor Show and its "Concept Sportback" model at the Frankfurt Motor Show. The new Lancer was previewed by these two concepts. The new Lancer was officially revealed in January 2007 at the North American International Auto Show and went on sale in North American markets in March 2007 as a 2008 model. New Lancer features Mitsubishi's next-generation RISE safety body.

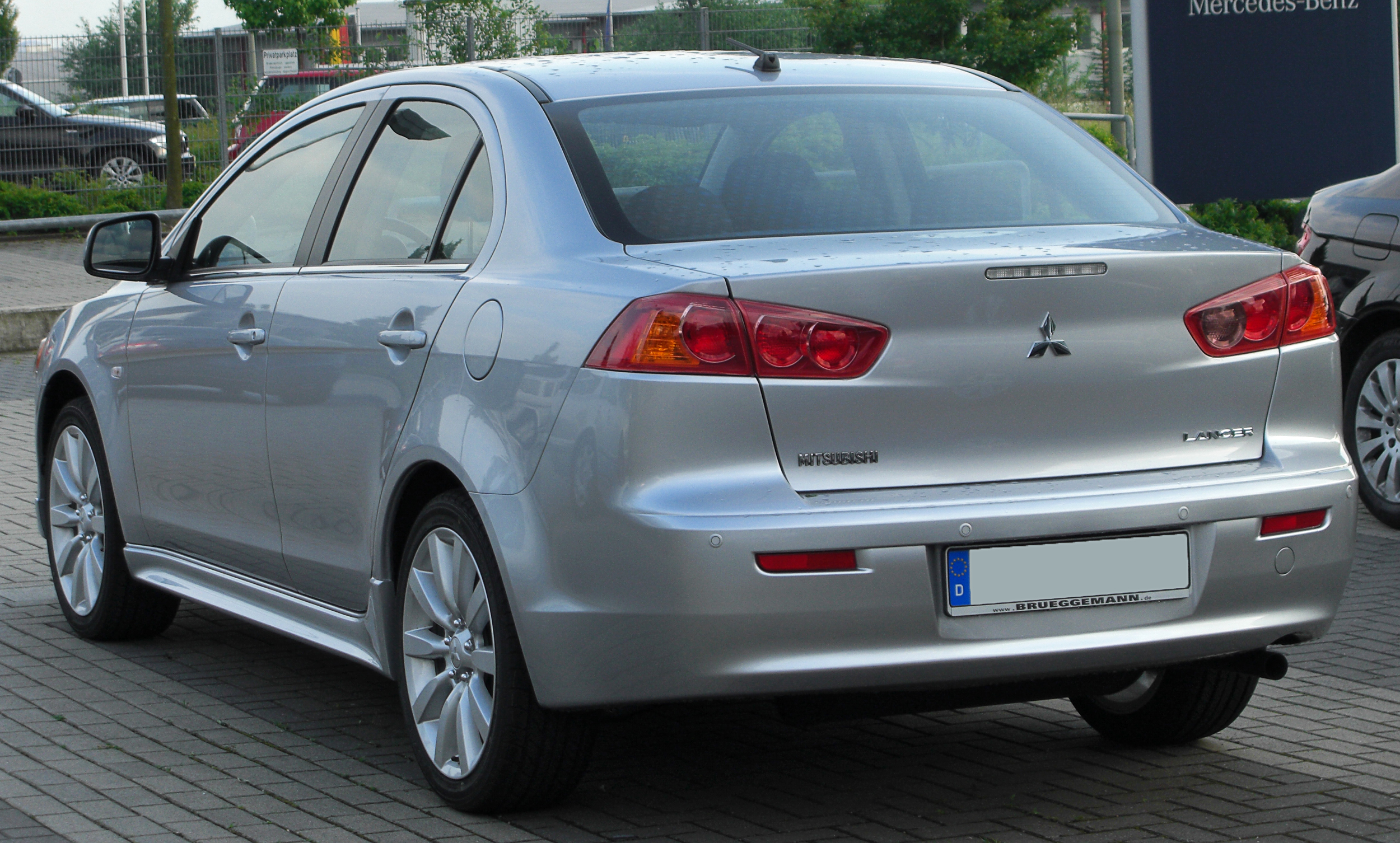
Sedan (Europe; pre-facelift)

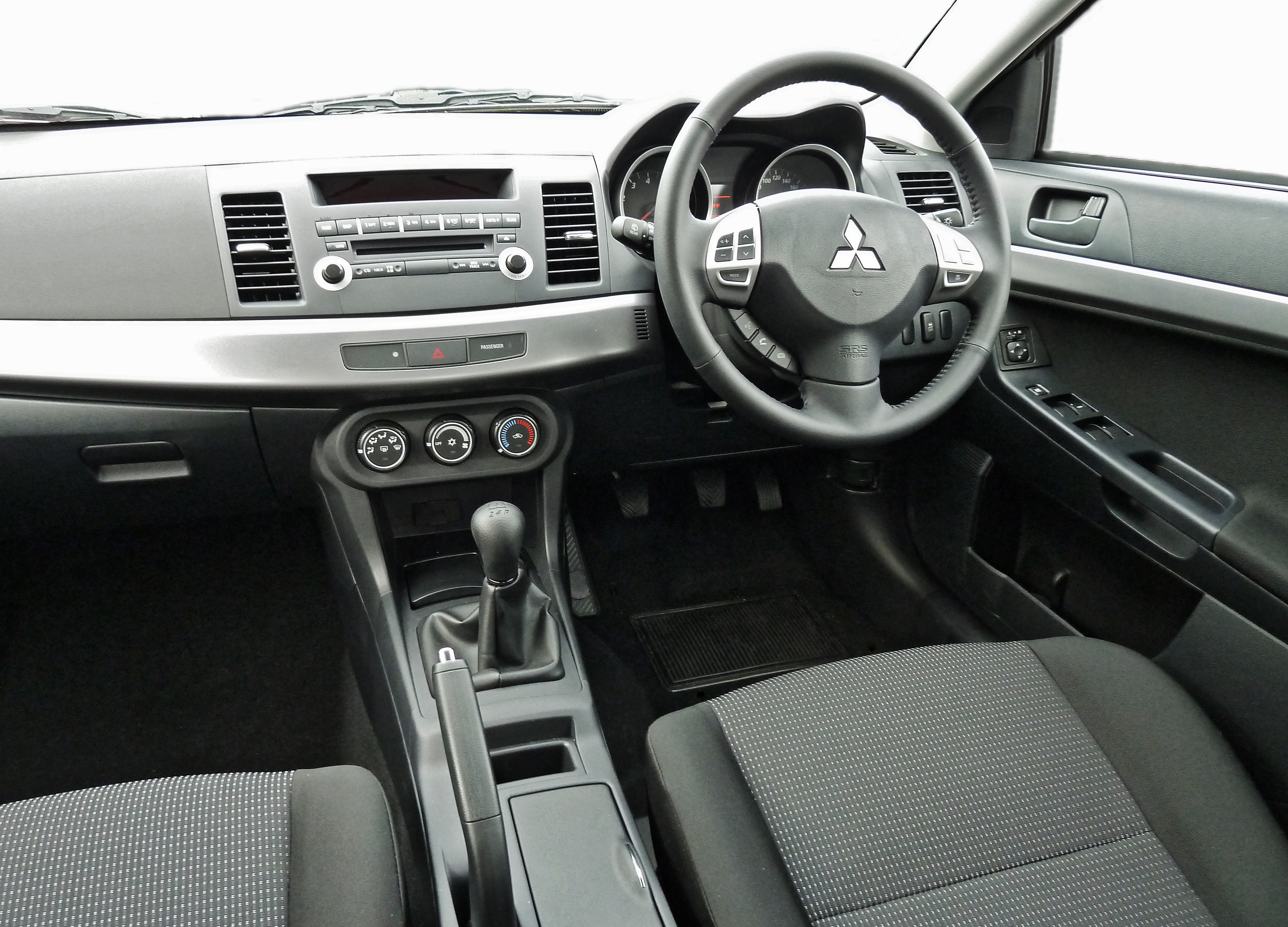
Interior

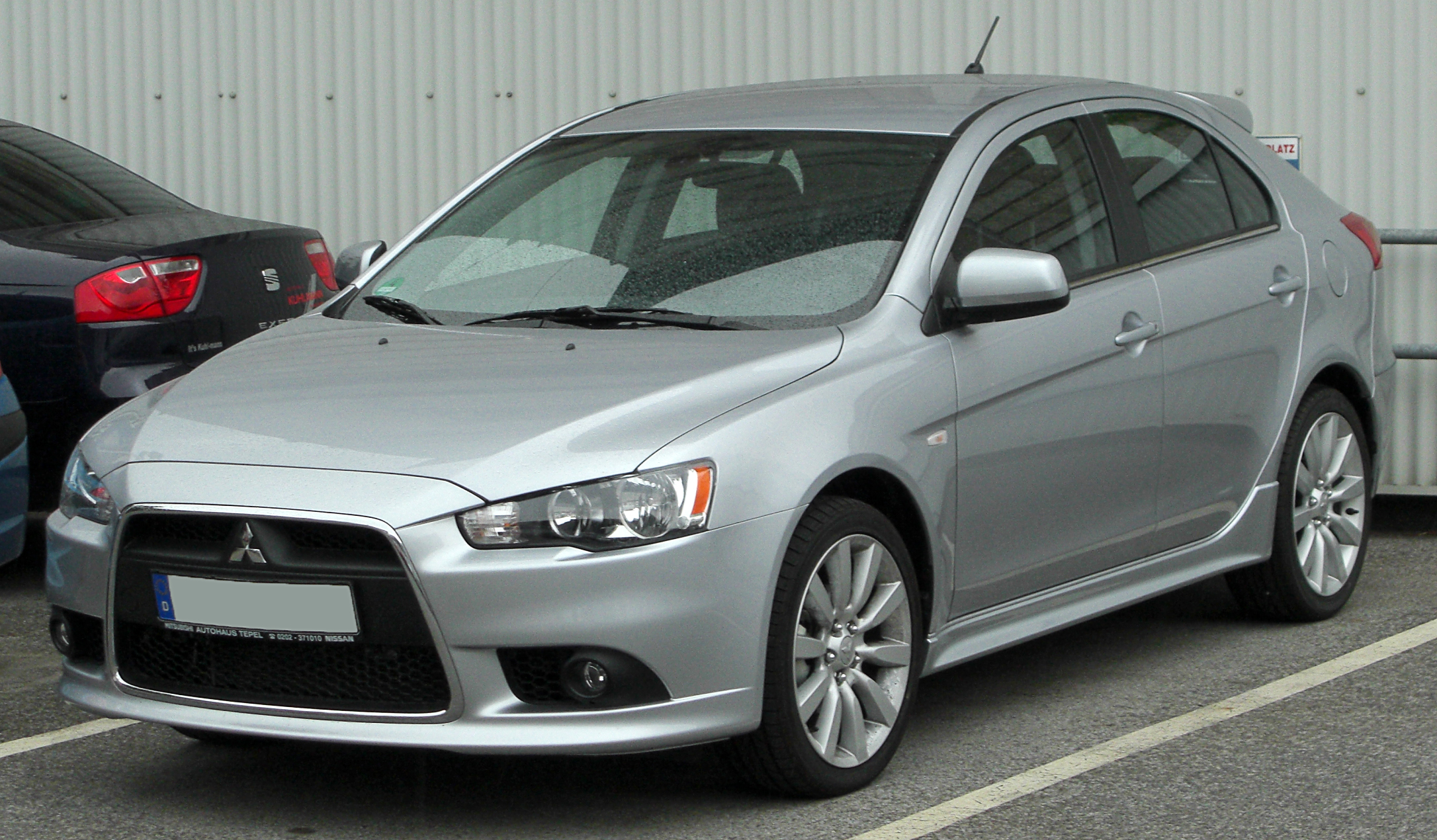
Sportback (Europe; pre-facelift)

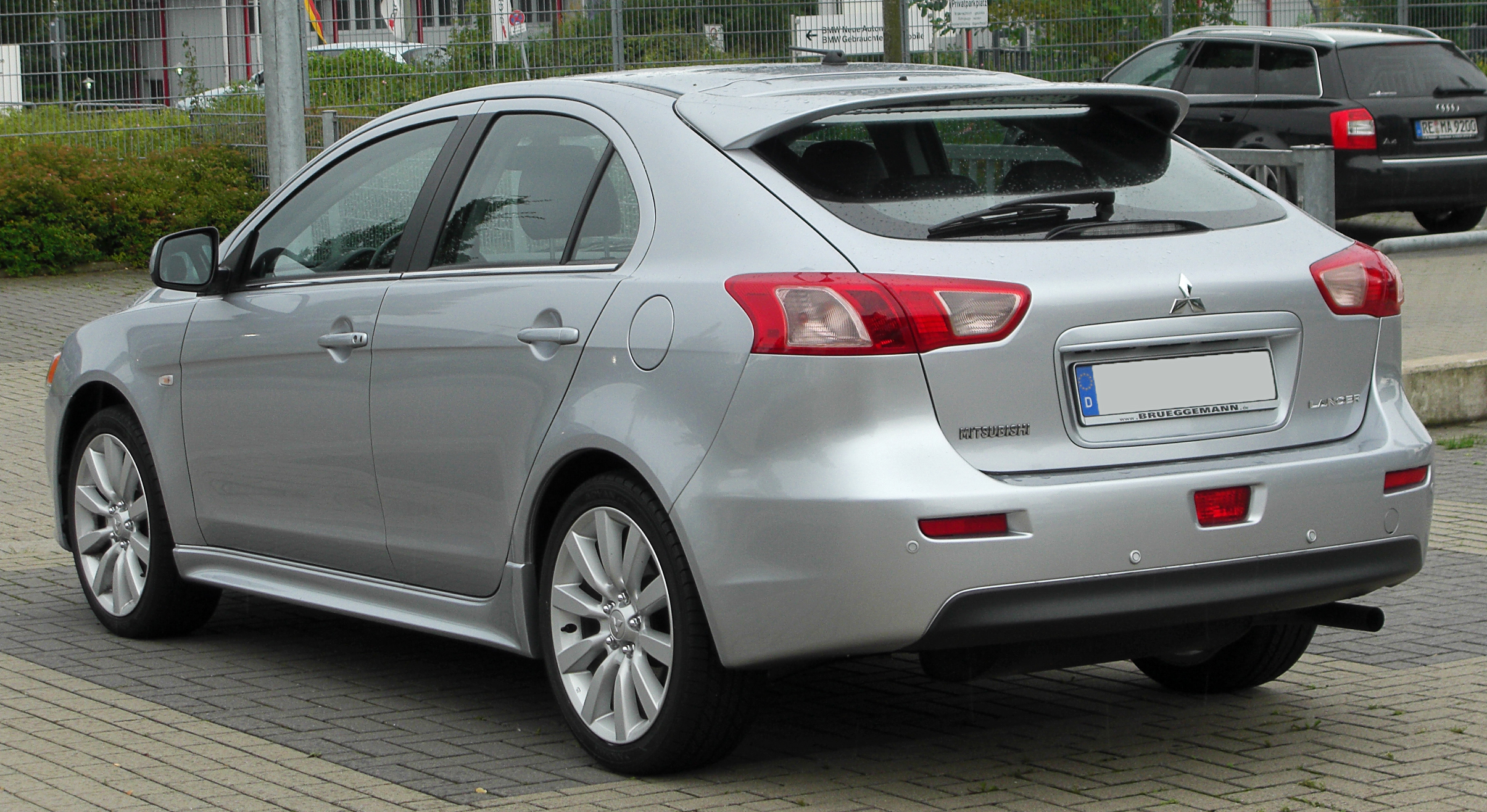
Sportback (Europe; pre-facelift)

=== Marketing ===
==== Asia ====
With the exception of the Lancer Evolution X, the Lancer is marketed as the Galant Fortis (Latin for strong, brave and resolute) in the Japanese domestic market because the sixth generation of Lancer is still in production at that time. It comes in three trim levels: Exceed, Super Exceed, and Sport.

Due to the popular demand for the previous 2000-era Lancer in Singapore, it continued to be sold alongside the new 2007 era Lancer which was called "Lancer EX" to differentiate itself from the former for two years. The 1.5- and 2.0-liter engine sizes and a flagship GT trim level were available in Singapore. For model year 2009, the design was refreshed all around with an updated front grille, darkened clear tail lamps, and chrome lining with an additional floor console internally. The rear for the 2.0-liter variants had disc brakes for better stopping power. From 2014 models onwards, only a 1.6-liter engine was offered in Elegance and Sports trim with factory AM/FM radio, ducktail spoiler, and 16" black gloss 10-spoke chrome rims or 16" Spaco gunmetal rims. For a limited period between 2015 and 2017, the Lancer EX had a slightly revamped rear with double rectangular “C-shaped” LED tail lamp clusters and had its Lancer badge positioned to the center of the boot.

In Malaysia, the Lancer was first launched in August 2007 with a sole variant known as GT. The Lancer was then updated in 2009 and an EX variant was launched in July 2010. In October 2010, the Sportback bodystyle was launched in October 2010. The Lancer was then updated in August 2012 and April 2014. Also, Proton had renewed cross-licensing and technology transfer agreements with Mitsubishi as of October 2008 and lead to the Proton Inspira which is a badge-engineered 2007–2017 Lancer.

In Indonesia, only the GT is sold and it utilizes the 2.0-liter 4B1 engine and is sold alongside the Evolution X. The previous generation Lancer was still sold, marketed as the Cedia using the 1.8-liter 4G9 engine.

Hong Kong received its unique edition of the Lancer in 2008, dubbed the Lancer 2.0. The car comes in two trim levels, without a name for either of them. Both are equipped with the 4B11 2.0-liter engine, seven airbags, eight-speaker stereo system, adaptive front-lighting system (AFS) with HID as well as 18-inch alloy wheels. The upper trim has a Ralliart style body kit which includes a revised front bumper, side skirt, rear bumper with diffuser, and the addition of a correct-to-Evolution X rear spoiler, while the lower trim makes do without the above-mentioned features.

In the Philippines, the 9th generation Lancer was launched in mid-2008 as the "Lancer EX" to differentiate it from the previous generation Lancer sold alongside it, which would be discontinued in 2012. It is only offered with a 2.0-litre 4B11 powerplant, and trims were the top-of-the-line GT and GT-A. The GT and GT-A were essentially the same, both coming with rear spoilers, side skirts, and 18-inch alloy wheels. The only differences between that GT came with a 5-speed manual, which was discontinued in 2010, while the GT-A came with an INVECS-III CVT with paddle shifters. A Ralliart version was produced place in 2010, with a 2.0-litre single turbo engine, making 240 hp, paired to a 6-speed dual-clutch transmission. Like the Evolution X, it came with an all-wheel-drive system featuring active yaw control and an active center differential. In 2011, 3 trim levels were offered as the previous generation; the base GLX with a 5-speed manual or 4-speed INVECS-II transmission, the mid-range GLS, which was discontinued in 2012 and higher-spec MX were both equipped with a 4-speed INVECS-II transmissions and all powered with a 1.6-litre 4A92 MIVEC engines. The refreshed Lancer EX was launched in 2016 with 2 trim levels available; the GLS with a 1.6-litre 4A92 MIVEC engine, mated with a 5-speed manual transmission and GT-A also with a 2.0-litre 4B11 engine, equipped with an electronic sunroof and mated with an INVECS-III CVT transmission.

Between August 2015 and August 2017, GHK Motors (Mitsubishi Brunei) had offered a version of the Lancer Sportback under the name Mitsubishi Galant in Brunei. The Galant is equipped with the 2.4-liter engine, 18-inch alloy wheels, a Ralliart style front grille, side skirts, rear spoiler, and sports front seats.

==== Australia ====
The Lancer was released in Australia in October 2007, designated the CJ series, and was initially available in ES, VR and VRX trim. The ES included cruise control, driver, passenger, and knee airbags, stability and traction control as standard. The VR added alloy wheels, fog lights, side skirts, boot lip spoiler, rain-sensing wipers, automatic headlights, six-disc CD changer, as well as curtain and side airbags. The VRX received extra skirts including front aprons, a larger rear spoiler, 18-inch alloys, 9-speaker Rockford Fosgate sound system, keyless entry, keyless engine start, and Bluetooth connectivity with voice control. All three models shared the same 4B11 2.0-litre engine and can be found with a manual gearbox or CVT. The Sportback body followed the sedan and has been available for all variants except the Aspire.

In July 2008, the Lancer Evolution X (officially just "Lancer Evolution" at the time) became available for orders in Australia.

In September 2008, another variant, the Aspire, was introduced. The Aspire was based on the 2009 model VRX, which had a new 4B12 2.4-litre engine. The Aspire included more luxury features and only came with a CVT, whereas the VRX maintained a manual gearbox option.

In late 2008, the Ralliart variant became available. It featured a single turbocharged version of the 4B11 engine, all-wheel drive (AWD) and a twin-clutch six-speed (TC-SST) gearbox.

In 2010, the limited edition ACTiV was added to the lineup. The ACTiV was based on the ES and added features such as 16-inch alloy wheels, side skirts, rear spoiler, hands-free Bluetooth and multi-function leather steering wheel.

Various special models have also been introduced, such as the Platinum Edition, which is based on the VR but added a chrome grille, window surrounds (sedan only), MMCS satellite navigation, and Bluetooth. The RX version is derived from the ES but comes with standard alloy wheels. Another model introduced in 2010 was the SX coming with factory alloys, leather steering wheel, and gear shifter as well as factory spoiler.

From the 2013 model year onward (introduced in late 2012), the Aspire was dropped.

==== Europe ====
In Europe, a diesel model was also available from 2007 to September 2010. This was a 2.0-liter PD-TDI 103 kW (138 hp) engine sourced from Volkswagen, with engine code BWC. From September 2010, it was also available with Mitsubishi's own 1.8-liter 4N1 engine. This engine has an aluminium cylinder block, four valves per cylinder and a common rail injection system with variable geometry turbocharger and variable valve timing. It develops 85 kW (116 PS; 114 bhp) and 300 N⋅m (221 lb⋅ft).

In Ireland, the specifications are different from those of models sold in the United Kingdom. The Lancer is available in five-door hatchback (Sportback) or four-door sedan body styles. Engines are the 1.5- and 1.8-liter petrol and the 2.0-liter diesel—all available in the United Kingdom until 2012. Trim levels are GS2, GS3, and GS4 for the saloon, and GS2, GS3, and Juro (satellite navigation and rear-view camera) for the Sportback. The Sportback Juro model marked a temporary end to the line in the UK and was the most generously equipped. A Ralliart version (petrol), a detuned version of the Evolution, was also available. Mitsubishi intended to supply the UK with 400 further Lancers in late 2014.

==== North America ====
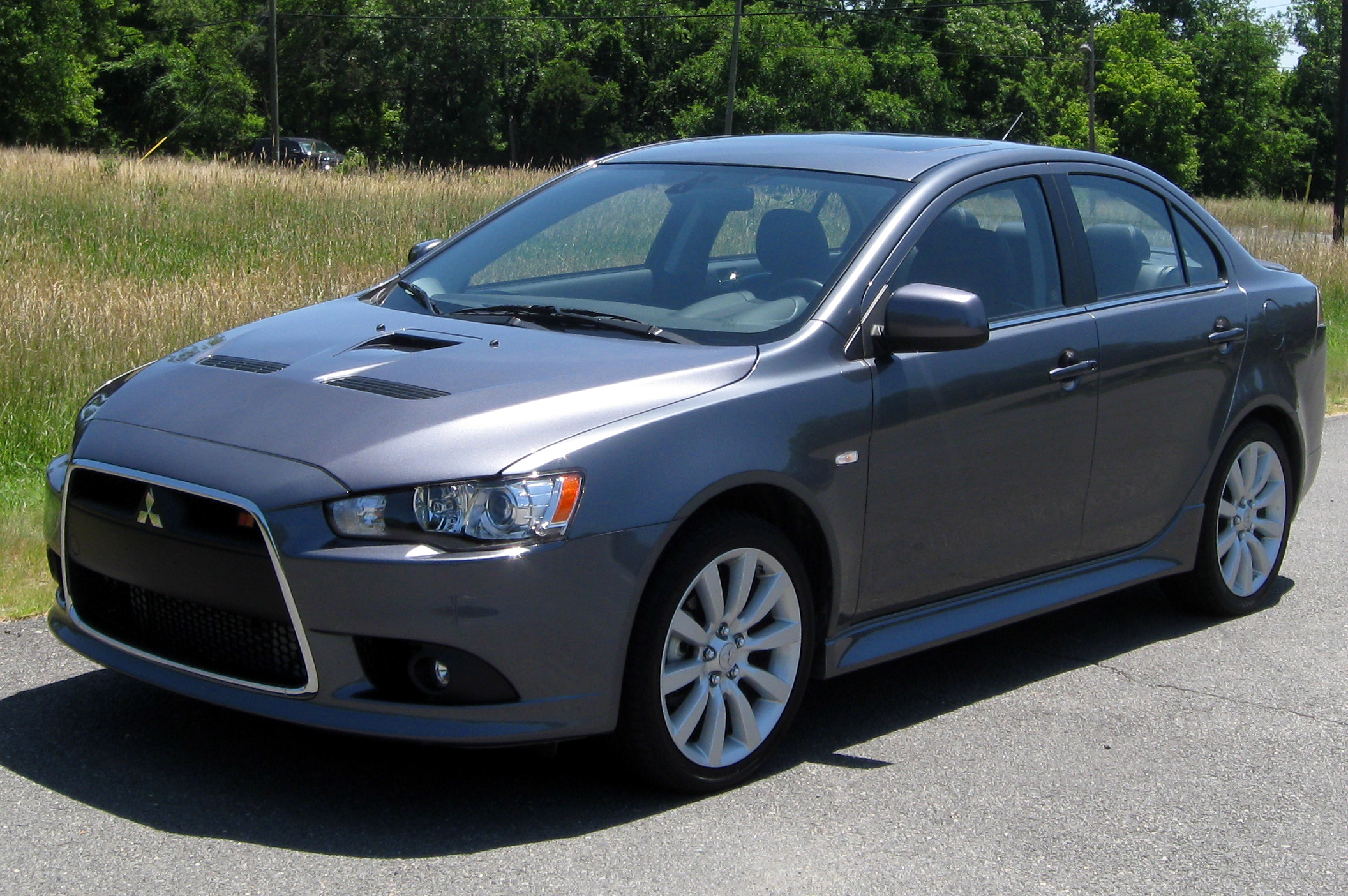
2011 Mitsubishi Lancer Ralliart sedan (US)

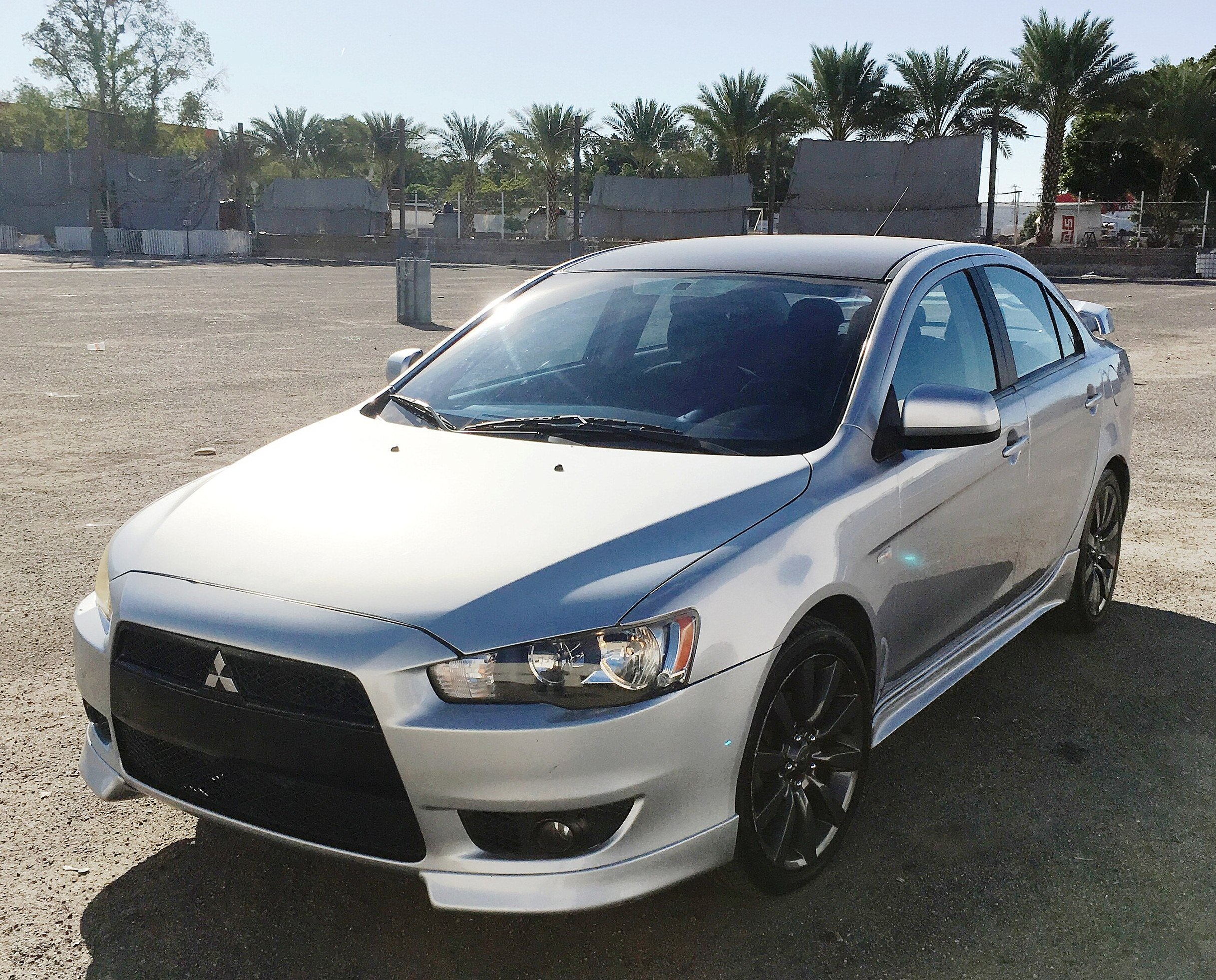
2009 Mitsubishi Lancer GTS (Mexico)

For the United States, the Lancer was initially available in DE, ES, and GTS trim levels. DE, ES, and GTS models are powered by a GEMA based 4B11, 2.0-liter DOHC engine producing 152 hp (113 kW) (except for California models which have been detuned to 143 hp (107 kW) to meet regulations). Transmission options include a brand new F1CJA continuously variable transmission (CVT), sourced from Jatco, alongside a regular F5MBB five-speed manual sourced from Aisin Seiki. GTS models get a six-speed paddle shift version of the CVT.

In Canada, a fourth model (SE) was introduced to the Lancer lineup. The SE model is a cross between the ES and GTS models. Features not included in the SE model that is found in the GTS are the FAST key, automatic climate control, carbon-fiber trim pieces, leather-wrapped steering wheel and shift knob, and 18-inch wheels.

For US markets, starting with the 2009 model year, an ES Sport version was released similar to the SE model for the Canadian market. Externally the ES Sport is similar in appearance to the GTS—with side skirts, rear spoiler, etc. (with the exception of the wheels, the ES Sport retains the ES wheelset). The ES Sport also uses the 2.0-liter engine.

For 2009, the GTS is powered by a 2.4-liter 4B12 engine producing 168 hp (125 kW) and 167 lb⋅ft (226 N⋅m).

For 2012, A new trim level called SE was added. The SE model features the 2.4-liter 4B12 engine and Mitsubishi's all-wheel-drive system. The SE is only available with a CVT transmission. For 2013, another trim level called GT was added. Based on the all-wheel-drive SE trim level, excluding the all-wheel control system, the GT features sportier suspension, upmarket options, and an available manual transmission.

The five-door hatchback version, known as the Sportback, was introduced for the Canadian market in spring 2009, and in the US for the 2010 model year in mid-2009.

A detuned and cheaper version of the Evolution X was announced at the 2008 North American International Auto Show. This model became available for purchase in the United States in October 2008.

For 2009, the Ralliart is available exclusively with the TC-SST transmission. The TC-SST transmission equipped in the Ralliart offers two modes (Normal, Sport) rather than the three modes the same transmission offers in the Lancer Evolution X MR (Normal, Sport, S-Sport). The car also includes a simplified version of the Evolution X's AWD system, with a simple "mechanical limited-slip" rear differential.

==== South America ====
To differentiate it from the previous model, still, on sale, this model is marketed as "Lancer Serie R" in Chile. For the same reason, in El Salvador, depending on the engine and trim, this series is titled "Lancer EX" or "Lancer GT".

In Brazil, Lancer was officially sold by Mitsubishi Motors 2007–2019. Between 2015 and 2019 was produced in Catalão Mitsubishi's factory. It was sold in four versions: MT, HL, HLE, and GT. All versions come with the 2.0-liter 4B11 I4 engine (gasoline). The Lancer Sportback was sold until 2013 in a single version, signed by Ralliart, and the Lancer Evolution X is also sold, although not produced locally.

=== Facelift ===
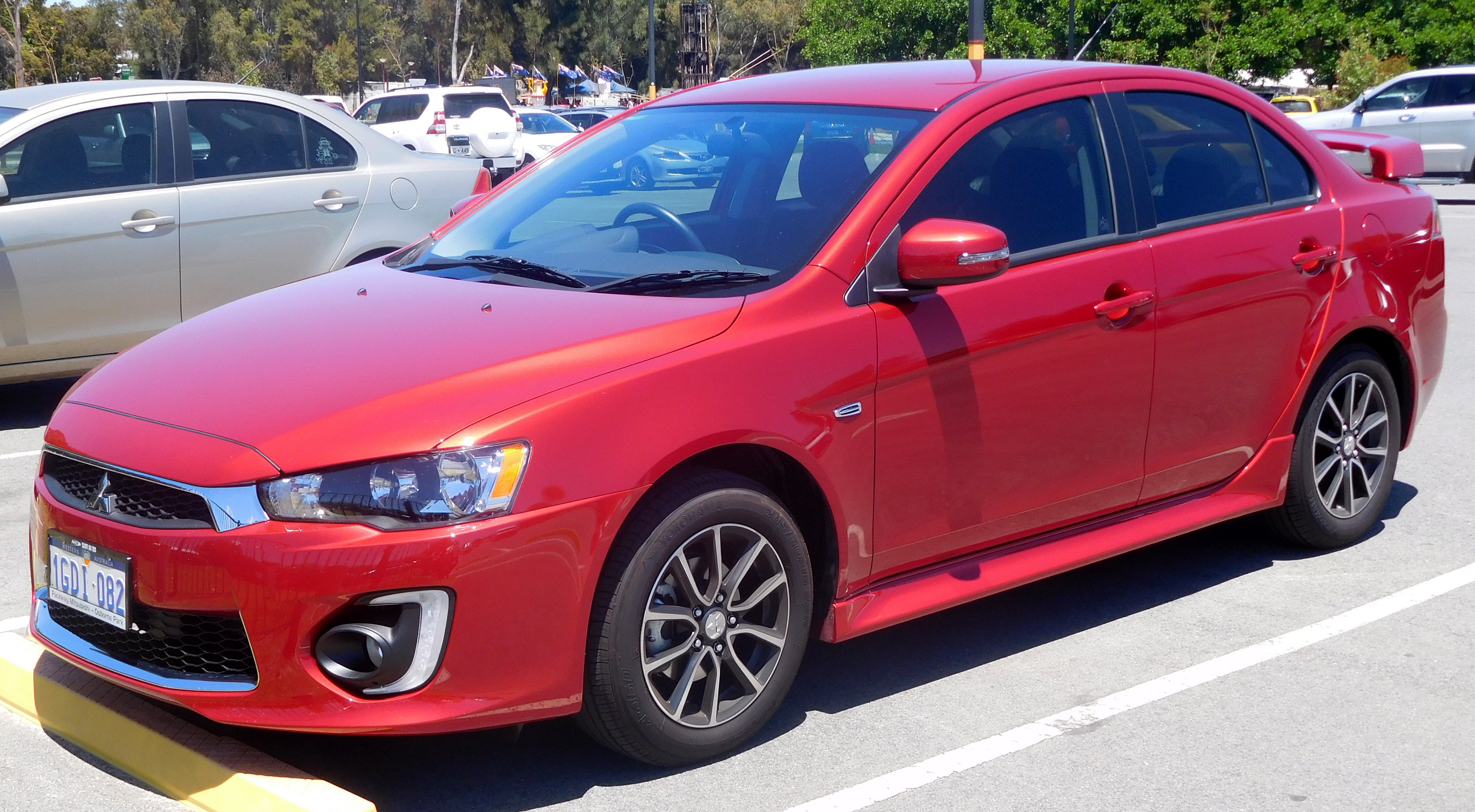

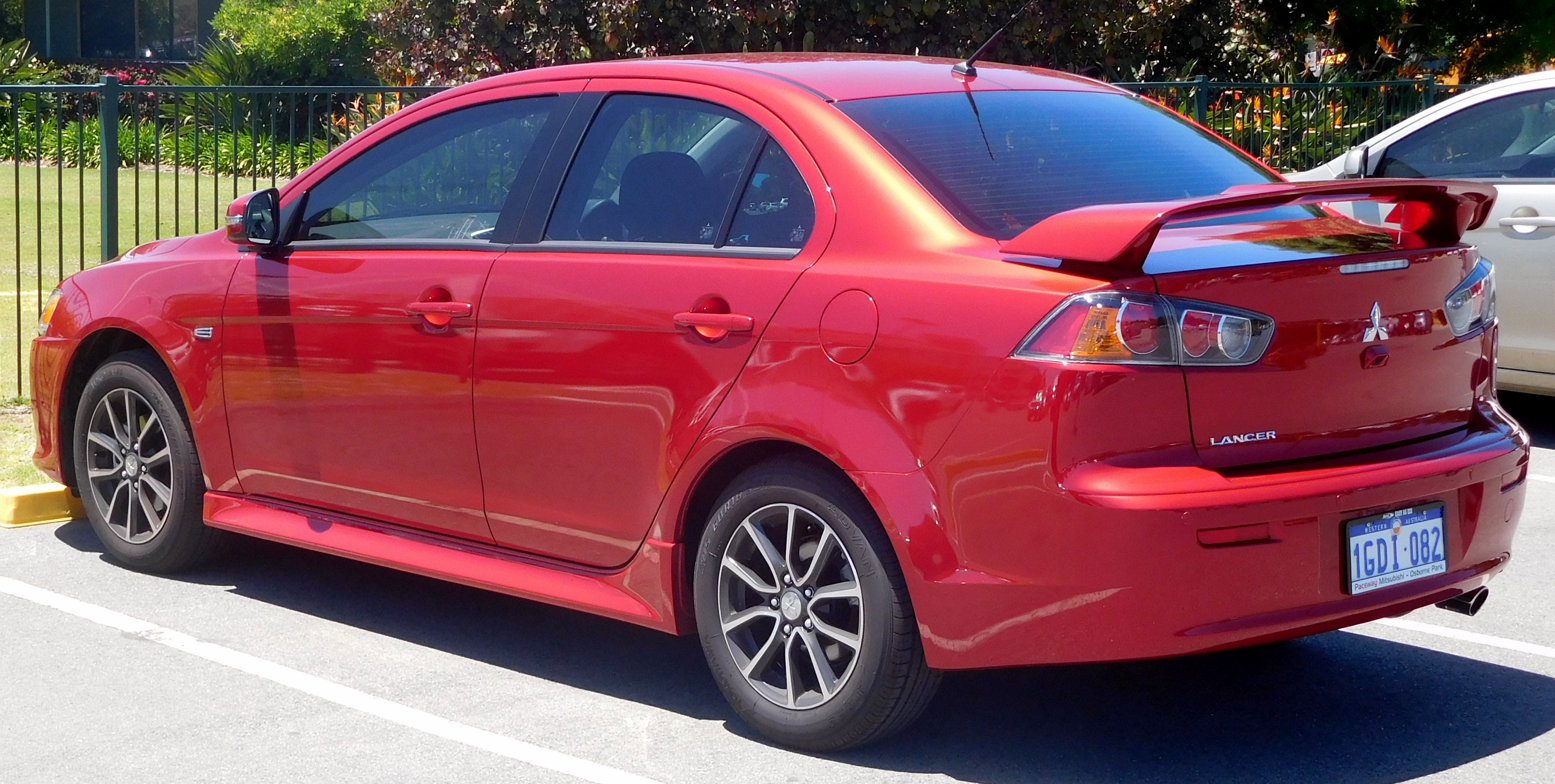
Mitsubishi Lancer ES Sport sedan (Australia; facelift)

In October 2015, Mitsubishi released details of the model year 2016 Lancer facelift for North America. The MY16 update was announced and released for Australia in December 2015. It sports a mildly altered front and does without the Ralliart-style grille of the MY15 version, now with a cleaner front bumper with integrated chrome upper and lower grilles. New C-shaped LED daytime running lamps surrounding the foglights and side skirts complete the exterior changes, while the cabin gains a high-contrast instrument cluster, a new front centre console with silver and black accents, and a new colour touchscreen audio system with DAB digital radio. It was also released in the Philippines in April 2016 and it came in two trims; GLS and GT-A.

=== Discontinuation ===
Mitsubishi Motors North America's executive vice president and CEO, Don Swearingen, confirmed in January 2017 that Mitsubishi would end the Lancer's production in August 2017 (production in Brazil continue until 2019), without a successor. Mitsubishi's main focus was to be on crossovers and SUVs, but production of the Mirage hatchback and the G4 sedan will continue due to ongoing popular demand for the Mirage nameplate in the North American market.

=== Lancer Fortis / Lancer iO ===
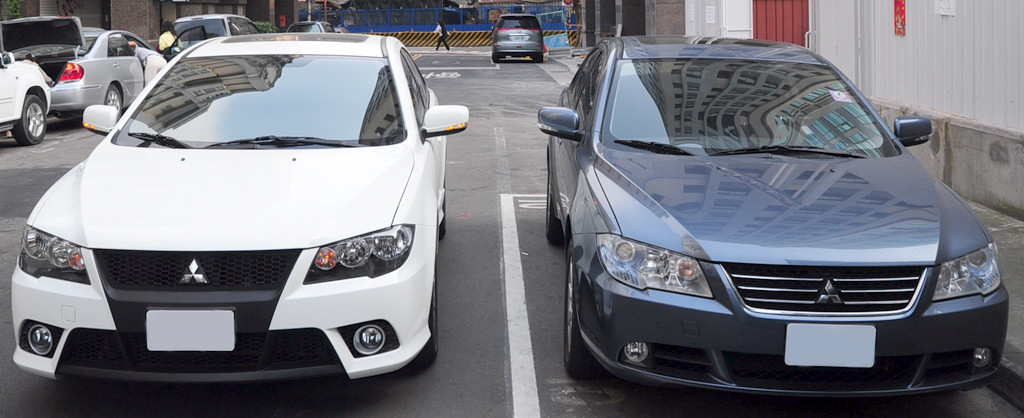

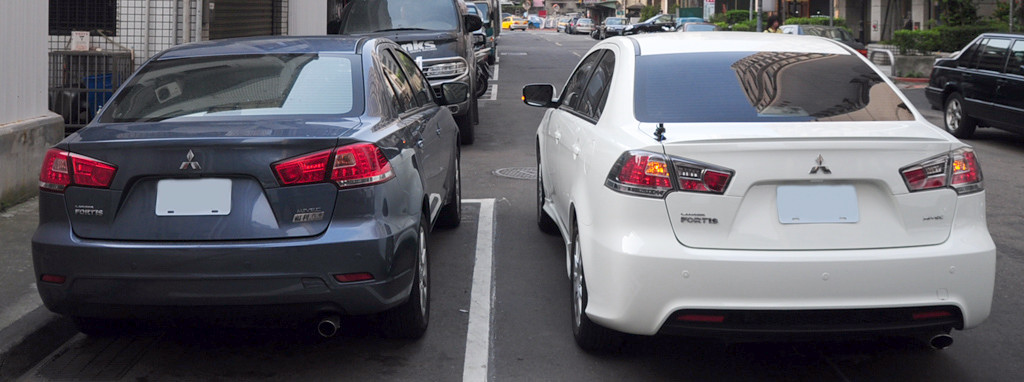
2007–2013 Lancer Fortis (grey)
2008–2011 Lancer iO (white)

The Lancer Fortis and Lancer iO are derivatives of the global Lancer model. Both models were developed primarily for the Taiwanese market, historically a stronghold for Mitsubishi vehicles. The Lancer Fortis and iO are locally assembled in Taiwan and China by CMC and Soueast respectively. CMC also exported the Lancer Fortis to the Middle East.

The Lancer Fortis made its debut in Taiwan in August 2007. The Fortis has a unique exterior design, but its interior styling and mechanical underpinnings are largely identical to the global Lancer model. Early models of the Lancer Fortis were powered by the 157 PS (115 kW), 2.0-litre 4B11 engine paired to the INVECS-III CVT gearbox. Later variants were offered with the 143 PS (105 kW), 1.8-litre 4B10 plant, while the 2.0-litre Fortis models were discontinued by 2010.

In April 2008, Mitsubishi launched the Lancer iO in Taiwan. The iO was pitched as a sportier version of the Lancer Fortis, featuring a more aggressive front grille and bumper combination. In February 2012, Mitsubishi discontinued the Fortis-based iO, and launched the global Lancer locally under the iO nameplate. The Taiwanese colloquial term for the 2012 Lancer iO and the global Lancer is 'shark head' (鯊魚頭).

The Lancer Fortis made its Chinese debut at the 2013 Shanghai Motor Show. The Chinese market Lancer Fortis features a different front grille and bumper design in addition to other minor cosmetic changes. The base models are powered by the 113 hp (84 kW), 1.6-litre 4A92 engine, and the range topping variants received the 1.8-litre 4B10. The Lancer Fortis in China is positioned in between the more expensive Lancer EX, and the cheaper Lancer Classic.

The Taiwanese market Lancer Fortis and iO were simultaneously facelifted in May 2014. The design of the front grille and bumper combination on both models became more aggressive, while the Fortis adopted the 'shark head' design and the headlamps from the global Lancer. The rear lamps on both models were also revised, and the interior designs received minor cosmetic enhancements. The powerplant configuration for both models was refined for better fuel efficiency but was otherwise largely unchanged. The Chinese market Lancer EX was later updated in line with the Lancer iO design.

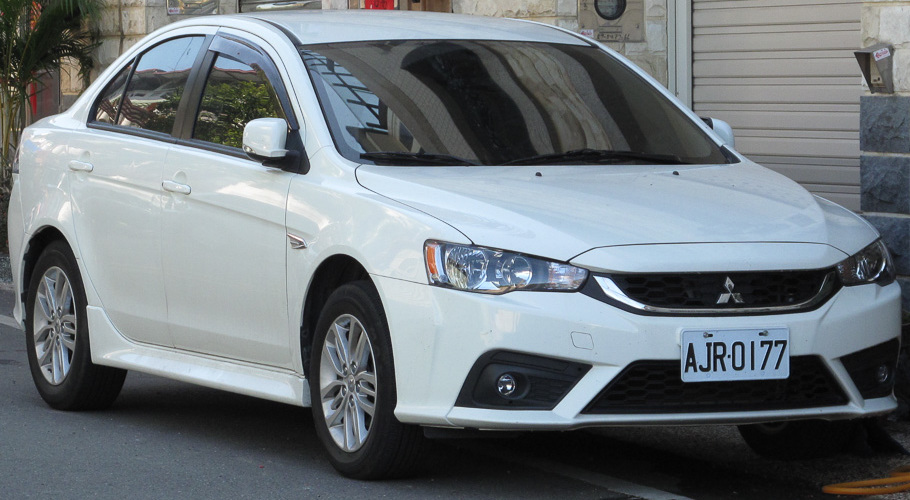
Mitsubishi Lancer Fortis second facelift front

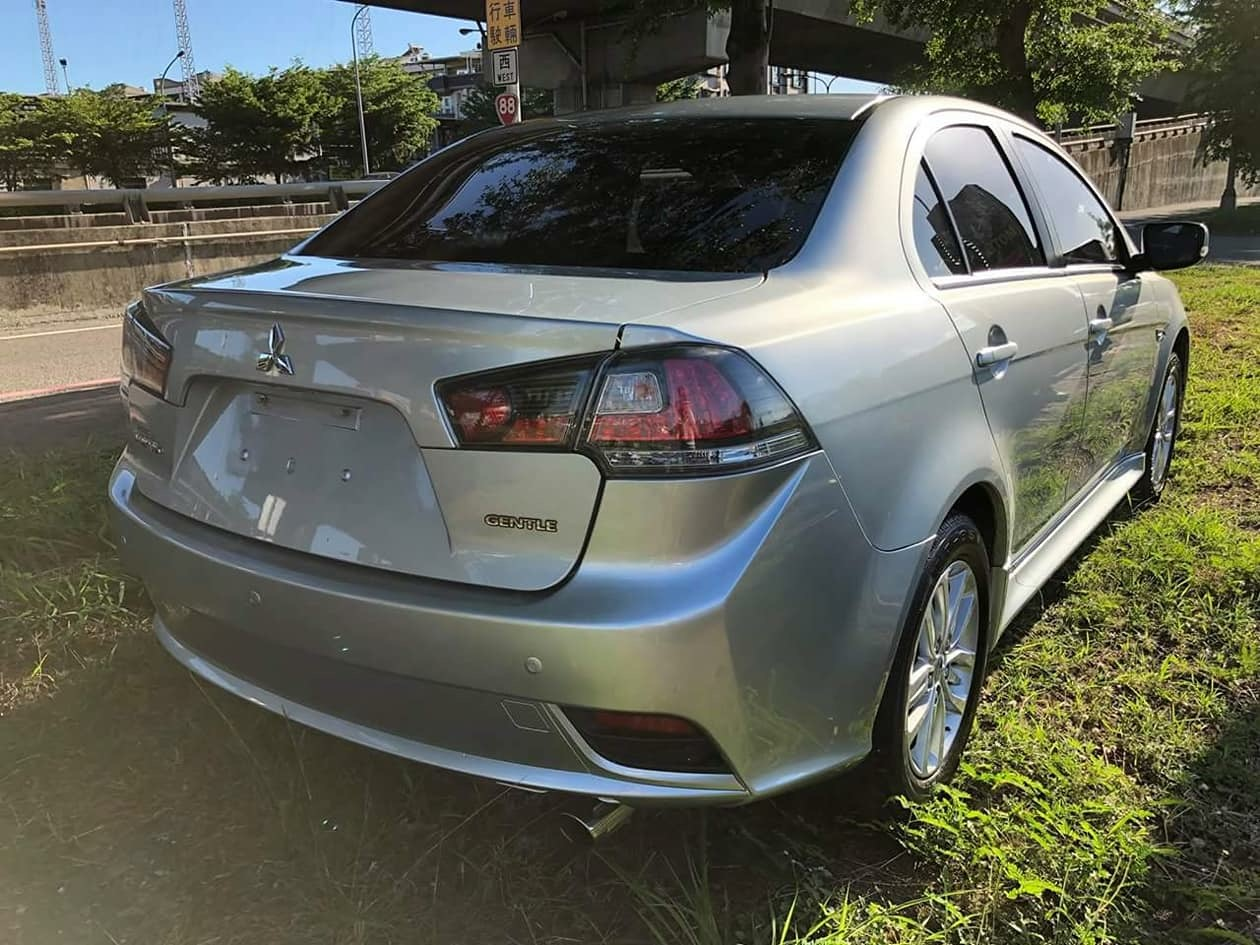
Mitsubishi Lancer Fortis second facelift rear

=== Safety ===
ANCAP test results* Mitsubishi Lancer sportback variants with dual frontal and driver knee airbags (2008)
| Test | Score |
|---|---|
| Overall | 4 /5 stars |
| Frontal offset | 15.56/16 |
| Side impact | 14/16 |
| Pole | Not Assessed |
| Seat belt reminders | 2/3 |
| Whiplash protection | Not Assessed |
| Pedestrian protection | Marginal |
| Electronic stability control | Standard |

ANCAP test results* Mitsubishi Lancer variants with dual frontal airbags and a driver knee airbag (2008)
| Test | Score |
|---|---|
| Overall | 4 /5 stars |
| Frontal offset | 15.56/16 |
| Side impact | 14/16 |
| Pole | Not Assessed |
| Seat belt reminders | 2/3 |
| Whiplash protection | Not Assessed |
| Pedestrian protection | Marginal |
| Electronic stability control | Standard |

ANCAP test results* Mitsubishi Lancer sportback variants fitted with side curtain airbags (2008)
| Test | Score |
|---|---|
| Overall | 5 /5 stars |
| Frontal offset | 15.56/16 |
| Side impact | 14/16 |
| Pole | 2/2 |
| Seat belt reminders | 2/3 |
| Whiplash protection | Not Assessed |
| Pedestrian protection | Marginal |
| Electronic stability control | Standard |

ANCAP test results* Mitsubishi Lancer variants with side curtain airbags (2008)
| Test | Score |
|---|---|
| Overall | 5 /5 stars |
| Frontal offset | 15.56/16 |
| Side impact | 14/16 |
| Pole | 2/2 |
| Seat belt reminders | 2/3 |
| Whiplash protection | Not Assessed |
| Pedestrian protection | Marginal |
| Electronic stability control | Standard |

ANCAP test results* Mitsubishi Lancer all variants (2011)
| Test | Score |
|---|---|
| Overall | 5 /5 stars |
| Frontal offset | 15.56/16 |
| Side impact | 14/16 |
| Pole | 2/2 |
| Seat belt reminders | 2/3 |
| Whiplash protection | Good |
| Pedestrian protection | Marginal |
| Electronic stability control | Standard |

ANCAP test results* Mitsubishi Lancer all variants (2013)
| Test | Score |
|---|---|
| Overall | 5 /5 stars |
| Frontal offset | 15.56/16 |
| Side impact | 14/16 |
| Pole | 2/2 |
| Seat belt reminders | 2/3 |
| Whiplash protection | Good |
| Pedestrian protection | Marginal |
| Electronic stability control | Standard |

== Tenth generation (2017) ==
Grand Lancer Tenth generation
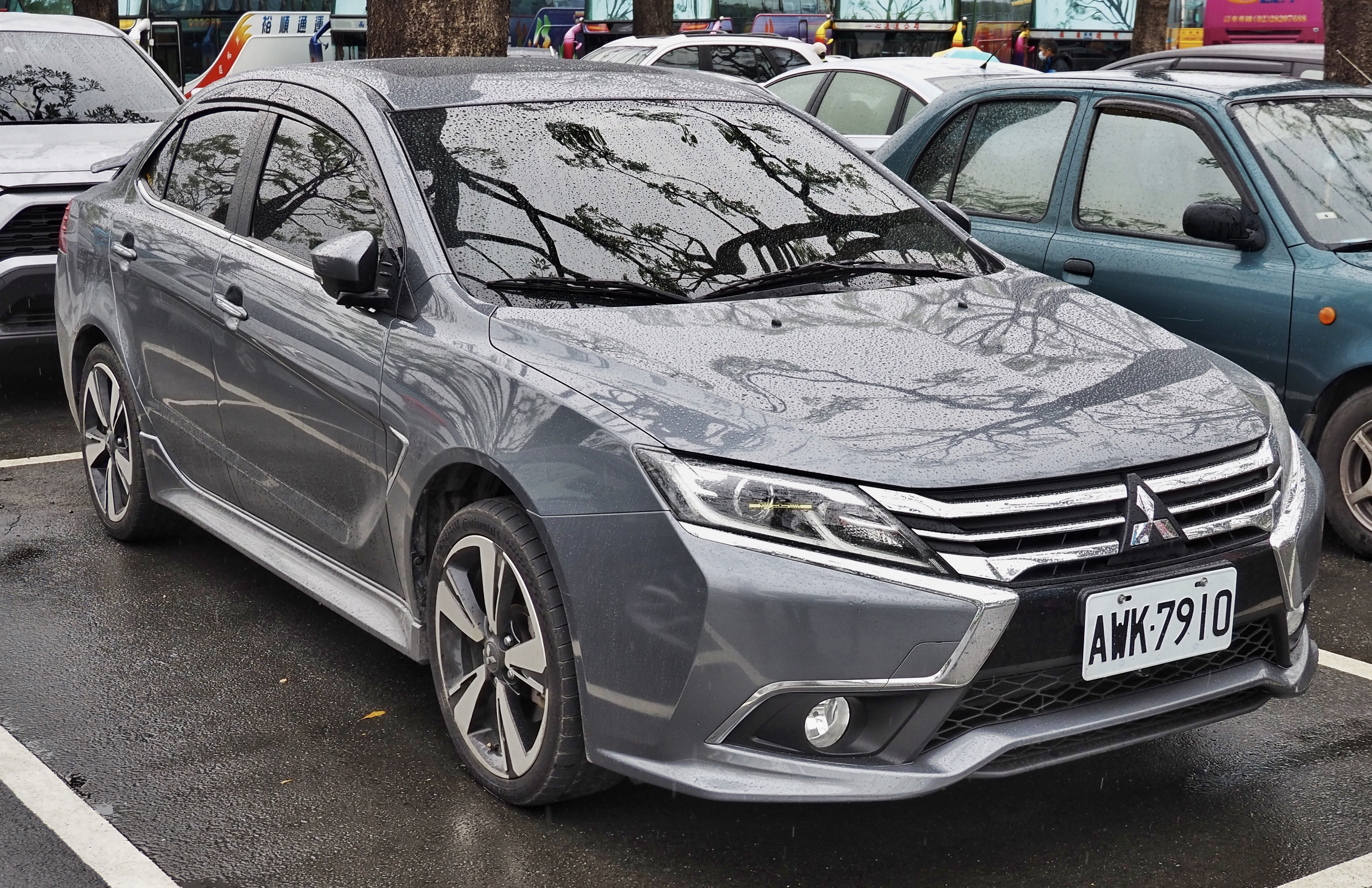

Overview
- Manufacturer: China Motor Corporation
- Model code: CS8A
- Also called: Mitsubishi Grand Lancer (Taiwan)
- Production: 2017 – April 2024
- Assembly: Taiwan: Yangmei (China Motor)
- Designer: Sin Ko at Pininfarina (2015)

Body and chassis
- Body style: 4-door sedan
- Layout: Front-engine, front-wheel-drive
- Platform: Mitsubishi GS platform

Powertrain
- Engine: 1.8 L 4J10 I4
- Transmission: Jatco CVT8 automatic (INVECS-III)

Dimensions
- Wheelbase: 2,635 mm (103.7 in)
- Length: 4,615 mm (181.7 in)
- Width: 1,770 mm (69.7 in)
- Height: 1,490 mm (58.7 in)
- Curb weight: 1,330–1,415 kg (2,932–3,120 lb)

In January 2017, Mitsubishi Motors agreed to continue the Lancer nameplate in certain Asian markets such as Taiwan after 2017, due to ongoing popular demand for the Lancer nameplate within the Chinese-speaking world. The development of the new Grand Lancer in Taiwan was led and designed by the Taiwanese China Motor Corporation (CMC). Part of the design was partnered with Pininfarina Shanghai. Due to the international version being discontinued, the new generation Lancer is built on the same platform as the existing model as an extensive facelift. It comes with the new Mitsubishi Dynamic Shield grille and redesigned creases over the side body panels. The interior, front hood, front bumpers, front fenders, front and rear door panels including the rear passenger door window, the boot lid, and the rear bumper have been completely redesigned for the new generation, while the rest is carried over from the pre-2017 model.

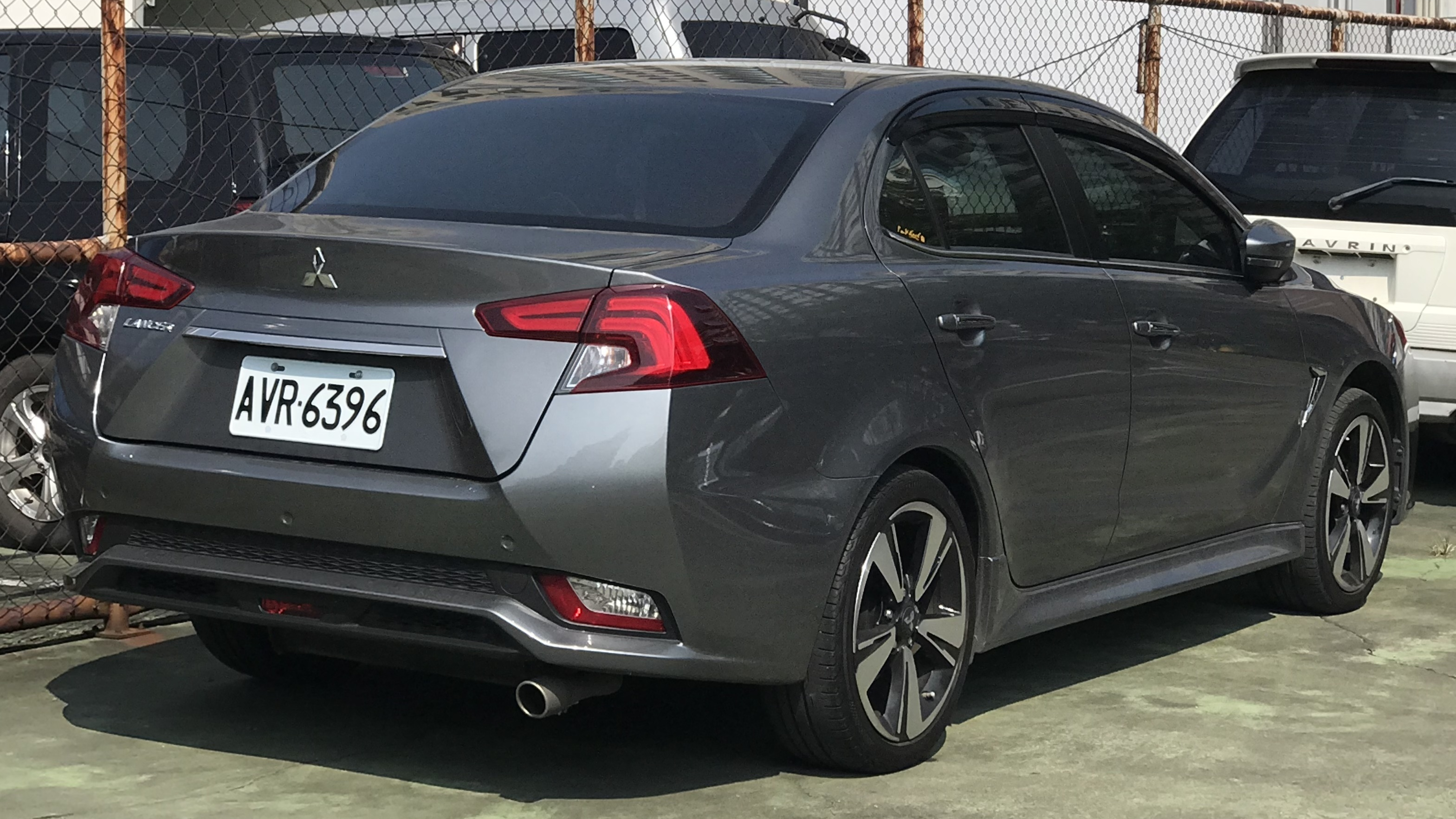
Rear view

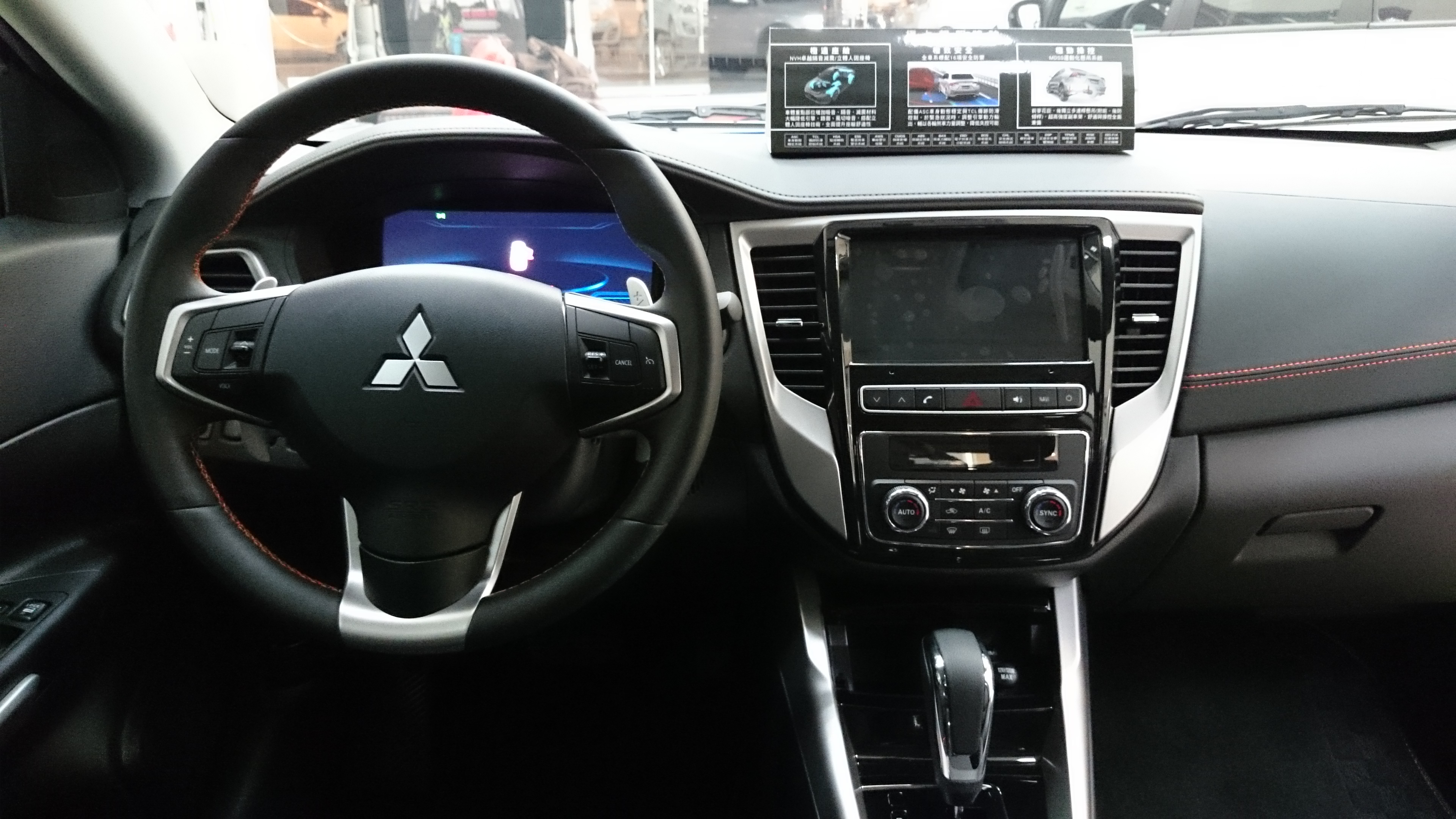
Interior

=== Discontinuation ===
On 1 April 2024, CMC confirmed the Grand Lancer had ended production, marking the end of the nameplate after 51 years.

== Sales ==
=== Australia ===
Since 2007, the Lancer has regularly featured within the Top 10 and Top 20 vehicle sales charts. Prior to the discontinuation of Lancer production in 2017, John Signoriello, CEO of Mitsubishi Motors Australia Ltd, decided to stockpile as many Lancers as possible, in order to sell them in succeeding years. The following table shows sales since 2006.

| Year | Units sold | Australian Sales Rank |
|---|---|---|
| 2006 | 15,500< | 14 |
| 2007 | —N/a | —N/a |
| 2008 | 19,688 | 8 |
| 2009 | 21,362 | 7 |
| 2010 | 23,064 | 9 |
| 2011 | —N/a | 10 |
| 2012 | —N/a | 16 |
| 2013 | —N/a | —N/a |
| 2014 | —N/a | —N/a |
| 2015 | —N/a | —N/a |
| 2016 | 7,272 | —N/a |
| 2017 | 7,560 | —N/a |
| Total | 94,446< | |

== See also ==
- Mitsubishi Lancer Cargo
- Mitsubishi Lancer Evolution
- Mitsubishi Lancer WRC
- Mitsubishi Racing Lancer
- Proton Inspira
- Proton Jebat
