= Chrysler Neon =

Compact car manufactured by Chrysler's Dodge and Plymouth

Chrysler/Dodge/Plymouth Neon
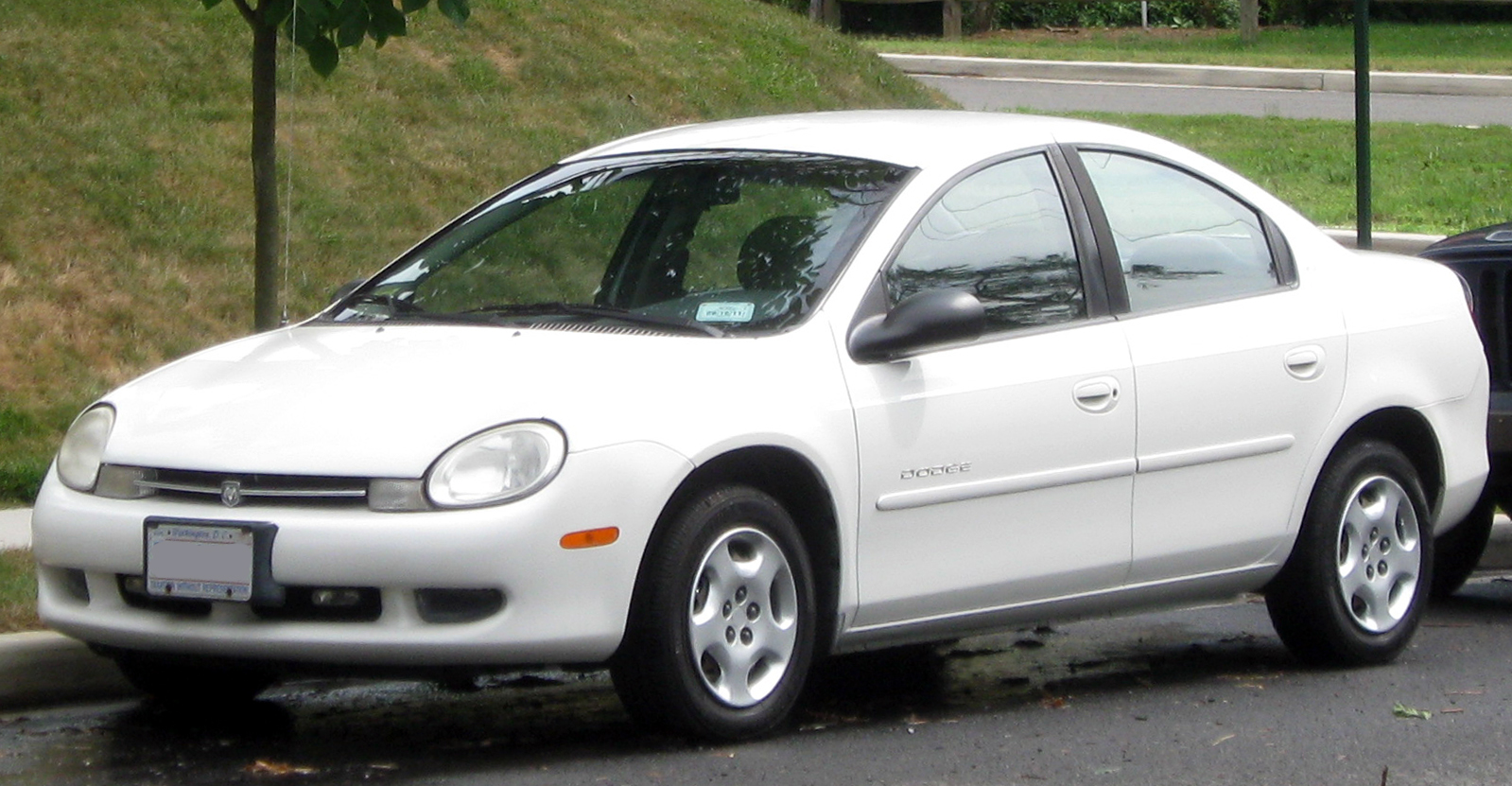

Overview
- Manufacturer: Chrysler Corporation (1995–1998); DaimlerChrysler (1998–2005); Fiat Chrysler (2017–2021)
- Also called: Chrysler Neon; Dodge Neon; Plymouth Neon (1995–2001); Dodge SX 2.0 (Canada); Dodge SRT-4 (2003–2005)
- Production: November 1993–2005; 2016–2021
- Model years: 1995–2005; 2017–2020

Body and chassis
- Class: Compact car
- Layout: Front-engine, front-wheel drive
- Platform: Chrysler PL platform
- Related: Dodge SRT-4; Chrysler PT Cruiser

Chronology
- Predecessor: Dodge Colt / Plymouth Colt; Dodge Shadow / Plymouth Sundance; Plymouth Laser
- Successor: Dodge Caliber

The Neon is a compact car built by Chrysler from the 1995 to 2005 model years. Taking its name from the inert gas, the model line was marketed by Dodge and Plymouth; in Europe, Mexico, Japan, South Korea, Egypt, Australia, South Africa, and South America, the Neon was branded as a Chrysler (from 2001 to 2003, also in Canada). The model line was the first compact car to become profitable for an American automaker.

The Neon used the front-wheel drive Chrysler PL platform, which replaced three sets of vehicles: the Dodge Omni/Plymouth Horizon (retired in 1990), the Dodge Shadow/Plymouth Sundance, and the Mitsubishi-sourced Dodge/Plymouth Colt (Eagle did not sell the Neon to replace the Summit).

For the Mexican and the Middle Eastern market, the Dodge Neon nameplate returned from 2016 to 2020 as a rebranded version of the Fiat Tipo sedan for the Mexican and the Middle Eastern market.

During its original production, Chrysler assembled the Neon in its Belvidere Assembly (Belvidere, Illinois) and Toluca Car Assembly (Toluca, Mexico State) facilities.

== Development ==
The development of the Neon began life in the mid-1980s at American Motors Corporation (AMC), as its designers began development on a replacement for the Renault Alliance (the American version of the Renault R9). In 1987, Chrysler Corporation acquired AMC, combining the AMC design team with Chrysler engineers previously assigned to the L platform (Omni/Horizon and variants).

The PL project became codenamed "Counterattack", in relation to Lee Iacocca's opinion to media statements that Big Three automakers could no longer build vehicles with the innovation, quality, or efficiency that their Japanese counterparts used to attract consumers. The project goal for the newly merged team was to develop a car that was "lightweight, fuel sipping, powerful, comfortable in an American manner, yet to cost no more than a bit under $4,000 to build, with a retail sales price of no more than $8,000".

Led by Tom Gale, the straight-edged 1980s design language retained a three-box layout (in contrast to the Omni and Horizon), but with far more modern styling, following the cab-forward designs debuted by the Lamborghini Portofino and Eagle Optima.

=== 1991 Dodge Neon concept ===
Chrysler introduced the Neon as a Dodge-branded concept car at the 1991 Frankfurt Motor Show. Developed as a prototype to expand its environmental friendliness, the Neon was assembled with recycled components and designed to be virtually 100% recyclable. To further reduce its impact, the car was fitted with an onboard trash compactor to eliminate litter created inside the vehicle.

Serving as a loose preview of the production vehicle in development, the 1991 Dodge Neon concept was a four-door sedan exploring cab forward design closer in a compact car. To maximize interior space, all four doors slid open from the center; the body was not fitted with a B-pillar. Similar to the Citroën 2CV, the Neon concept was fitted with a full-length retractable fabric roof, effectively making the car a four-door convertible. While fitted with a conventional 3-speed automatic, the concept used a 100 hp (75 kW) 1.1 L I3 two-stroke engine supplied by Mercury Marine.

The Dodge Neon concept car earned a gold IDEA91 award by the Industrial Designers Society of America.

=== Development ===
While several features of the 1991 concept were abandoned for production (including its power-sliding doors, retractable fabric roof, trash compactor, and two-stroke engine), the styling of the concept vehicle heavily influenced the production vehicle, including its rounded roofline, circular headlights, and minimalist grille design (abandoning the Dodge crosshair design).

== First generation (1994) ==
First generation
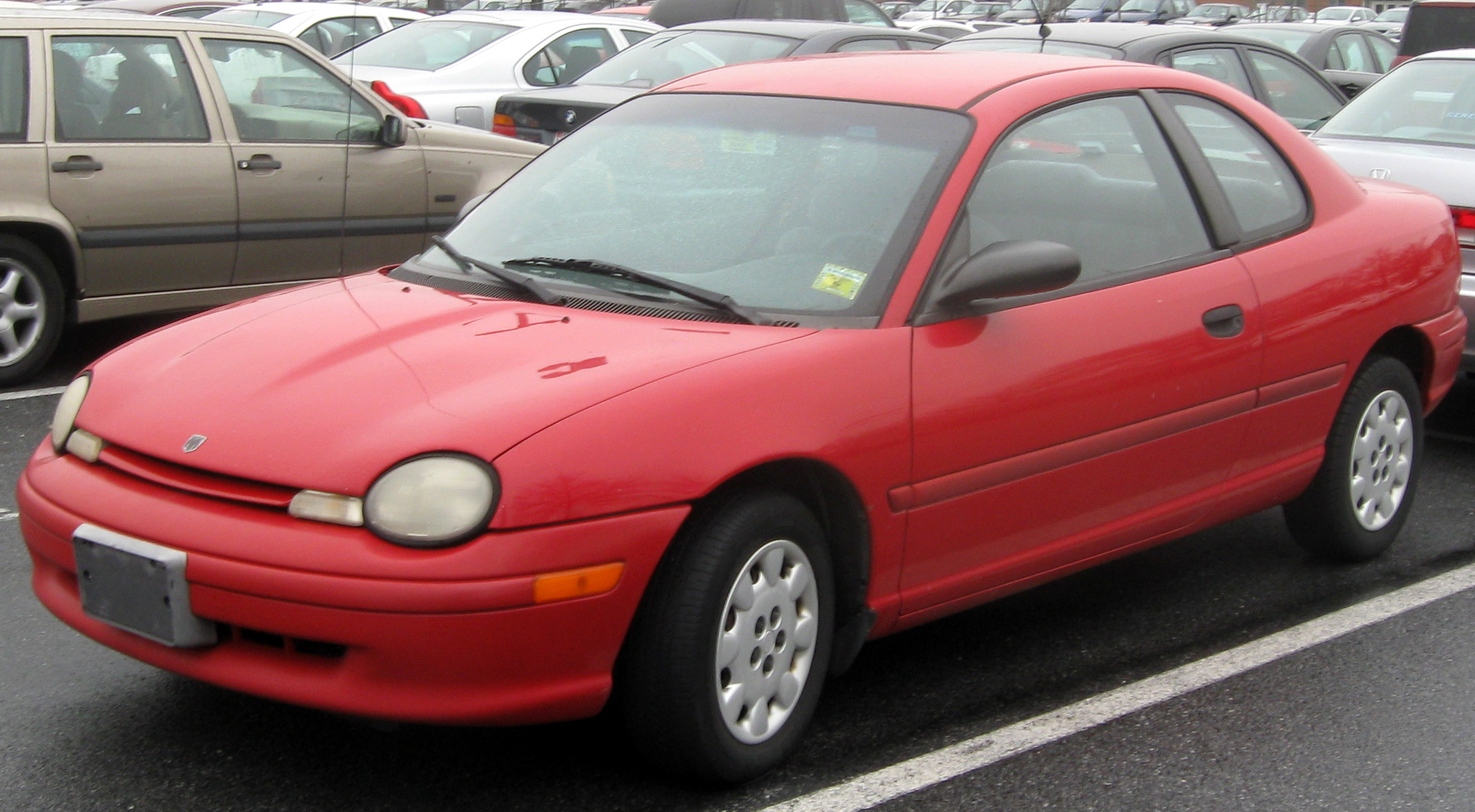
- 1997-1999 Dodge Neon Highline coupe

Overview
- Also called: Chrysler Neon; Dodge Neon; Plymouth Neon
- Production: November 10, 1993 – August 1999
- Assembly: United States: Belvidere, Illinois (Belvidere Assembly); Mexico: Toluca, Mexico State (Toluca Car Assembly); Venezuela: Valencia, Carabobo (Carabobo Assembly)
- Designer: Tom Gale (1991)

Body and chassis
- Class: Compact car
- Body style: 2-door coupe; 4-door sedan

Powertrain
- Engine: 1.8 L EBD I4 (gasoline); 2.0 L A588 I4 (gasoline); 2.0 L ECC I4 (gasoline)
- Transmission: 5-speed NVG T-350 manual; 3-speed TorqueFlite 31TH automatic

Dimensions
- Wheelbase: 104.0 in (2,642 mm)
- Length: 171.8 in (4,364 mm)
- Width: 67.5 in (1,714 mm)
- Height: 54.9 in (1,394 mm)

The first generation Neon was introduced at the 1993 Frankfurt Motor Show and went on sale in January 1994 for the 1995 model year. It was available as a four-door notchback sedan and a two-door notchback coupe. Available engines were SOHC and DOHC versions of Chrysler's 2.0 L 4-cylinder engine producing 132 hp (98 kW) at 6,000 rpm and 129 lb⋅ft (175 N⋅m) at 5,000 rpm or 150 hp (112 kW) at 6,500 rpm and 133 lb⋅ft (180 N⋅m) at 5,600 rpm, respectively; transmission options were a 3-speed Torqueflite automatic or a five-speed manual.

Dodge Neon sedan; rear view

The car was badged and sold as both a Dodge and a Plymouth in the United States and Canada; in Mexico and Gulf Cooperation Council it was sold as a Dodge and a Chrysler, and in Europe, Australia, and other export markets it was sold as the Chrysler Neon. At the Neon's release, then president of Chrysler Corporation Bob Lutz said, "There's an old saying in Detroit: 'Good, fast, or cheap. Pick any two.' We refuse to accept that." The Japanese press touted the Neon as the "Japanese car killer", due to a spiraling Yen due to the Japanese "bubble economy" crash and the lower production cost of the Neon. The Neon also became the first Chrysler small car sold in Japan but despite focused attention, only 994 were sold in Japan between June and December 1996. One hindrance to sales was that the Neon was classed in the larger "Normal sized Passenger vehicles" tax bracket according to the Japanese Government dimension regulations which obligated Japanese owners for additional yearly road taxes which affected sales; had it been 19 mm (0.75 in) narrower it would have been in a significantly lower tax category. The Neon received praise for its appearance, price, and ample power when compared to its competitors. Car and Driver tested the DOHC 5-speed equipped Neon R/T and reported that it could run 0–60 in 7.6 seconds and 16.0 seconds in the quarter mile. First-generation Neons were competitive in SCCA Solo autocross and showroom-stock road racing.

=== Equipment ===
Neons had unconventional option availability, including the lack of power windows in the rear doors. Certain color base-model Neons, including red and black, had bumper covers molded in color rather than painted. These covers, while textured and not as glossy as paint, absorbed scuffs and scrapes with less visible damage. The mid-level Highline models for 1995 and 1996 used wheel covers with a bubble design. Initially, Neons were available in many bold colors including Nitro yellow-green, Lapis Blue, Aqua, and Magenta. Paint color choices became more subdued by the 1998-1999 model years, as the majority of buyers opted for more conventional tones.

In the Australian market, Chrysler Neons came in two models, the SE and the better-equipped LX. Later, the LX model was replaced by the LE with the updated model in 1999.

In Japan, only the sedan was offered. It was very similar to those sold in the Australian market. it was equipped with amber turn signal indicators next to the tail lights to comply with Japanese regulations and a side indicator installed in the fender behind the front wheel opening.

In the United States, the lineup started out as Base, Highline, and Sport, with different styles and options in each line, but the lineup titles changed frequently (other trim lines included Expresso, SE, ES, SXT, ACR, and R/T).

In Europe, the car was also available with a 1.8 L engine to suit local tax regimes. Europe received one limited-edition model, the CS that came only in Platinum paint. It was fitted with the 131 bhp (98 kW) SOHC engine, North American R/T specification suspension (slightly lower, 3.5 cm (1.4 in) rear, 2.7 cm (1.1 in) front), rear spoiler, unique alloy wheels, standard leather interior, dual stainless steel exhaust, a six-CD changer, and a shorter 5-speed manual gearbox.

=== Production figures ===
Model Year	Dodge Neon			Plymouth Neon			Chrysler Neon (export only)	Annual Total
Model Year	Coupe	Sedan	Yearly Total	Coupe	Sedan	Yearly Total	Chrysler Neon (export only)	Annual Total
1995	33,800	204,647	238,447	27,320	176,967	204,287	54,976	497,710
1996	38,407	79,247	147,110	30,847	84,635	115,482	24,801	287,393
1997	33,517	99,605	133,122	24,890	72,217	97,107	25,166	255,395
1998	34,500	125,249	159,749	21,902	81,806	103,708	19,321	282,778
1999	19,570	43,025	62,595	11,924	31,674	43,598	13,605	119,798
Totals			741,023			564,182	137,869	1,443,074

=== Trim levels ===
Plymouth Neon: 1995–1999

- base – 1995–1995 - Standard features included a 2.0 L Inline 4-cylinder engine, 5-speed manual transmission, 13-inch steel wheels with wheel covers, AM/FM stereo with 4 speakers, and dual front SRS airbags.
- Highline – 1994–1999- Added to Base air conditioning, side molding, daytime lights, remote trunk release, painted bumper.
- Sport – 1994–1996- Added to Highline color-keyed wheel covers, AM/FM stereo with a cassette player, equalizer, CD changer controls, and 6 speakers.
- Expresso – 1995–1999- Added to Highline power front windows an AM/FM stereo with cassette player.
- EX – 1997–1999 (Canada only)
- ACR – 1995–1999- Stood for American Club Racer, added alloy wheels to Base.
- Style – 1997–1999

Dodge Neon: 1995–1999

- base – 1995-1995- Standard features included 2.0L Inline 4-Cylinder (I4) engine, 5-speed manual transmission., 13-inch steel wheels with wheel covers, AM/FM stereo with 4 speakers, and dual front SRS airbags.
- Highline – 1995–1999- Added to Base air conditioning. 14 inch wheel steel wheels with wheel covers. can be optioned with the "power bulge hood" as well as a "surfboard style" spoiler. The highline trim was the "base model" closer to the end of the 1st generation.
- Sport – 1995–1999- Added to Highline color-keyed wheel covers, AM/FM stereo with a cassette player including an equalizer, CD changer controls, and 6 speakers.
- EX- 1997–1999 (Canada only) The EX trim was a package that included 2.0L DOHC, Tilt steering, Front/Rear floor mats, AM/FM/Cassette and six speakers, power bulge hood, rear deck spoiler, cast-aluminum “Neon” alloys, and “EX” decals on the C-pillars.
- ACR – 1995–1999- Stood for American Club Racer, added alloy wheels to Base. came with fog light orientated bumper. originally only sold to SCCA members.
- R/T – 1998–1999- Added to Highline white hood and trunk "Rally" stripes, white-painted alloy wheels, AM/FM stereo with a cassette player including an equalizer, CD changer controls, and 6 speakers, as well as a rear "Surfboard style" spoiler.

Chrysler Neon (Europe): 1995–1999

- LE – 1995–1999
- LX – 1995–1999
- SLX – June 1997 – 1999
- GLX – October 1997 – 1999
- CS – February 1998 – 1999
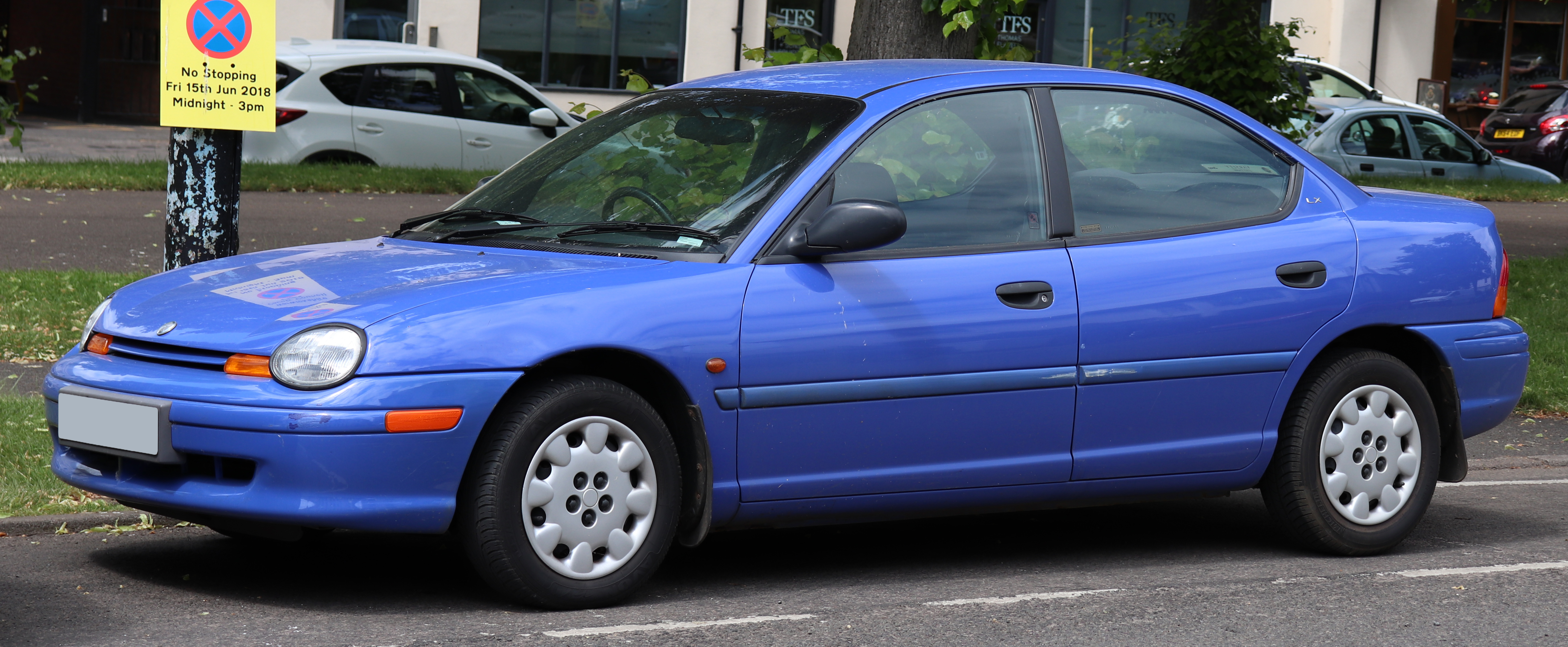

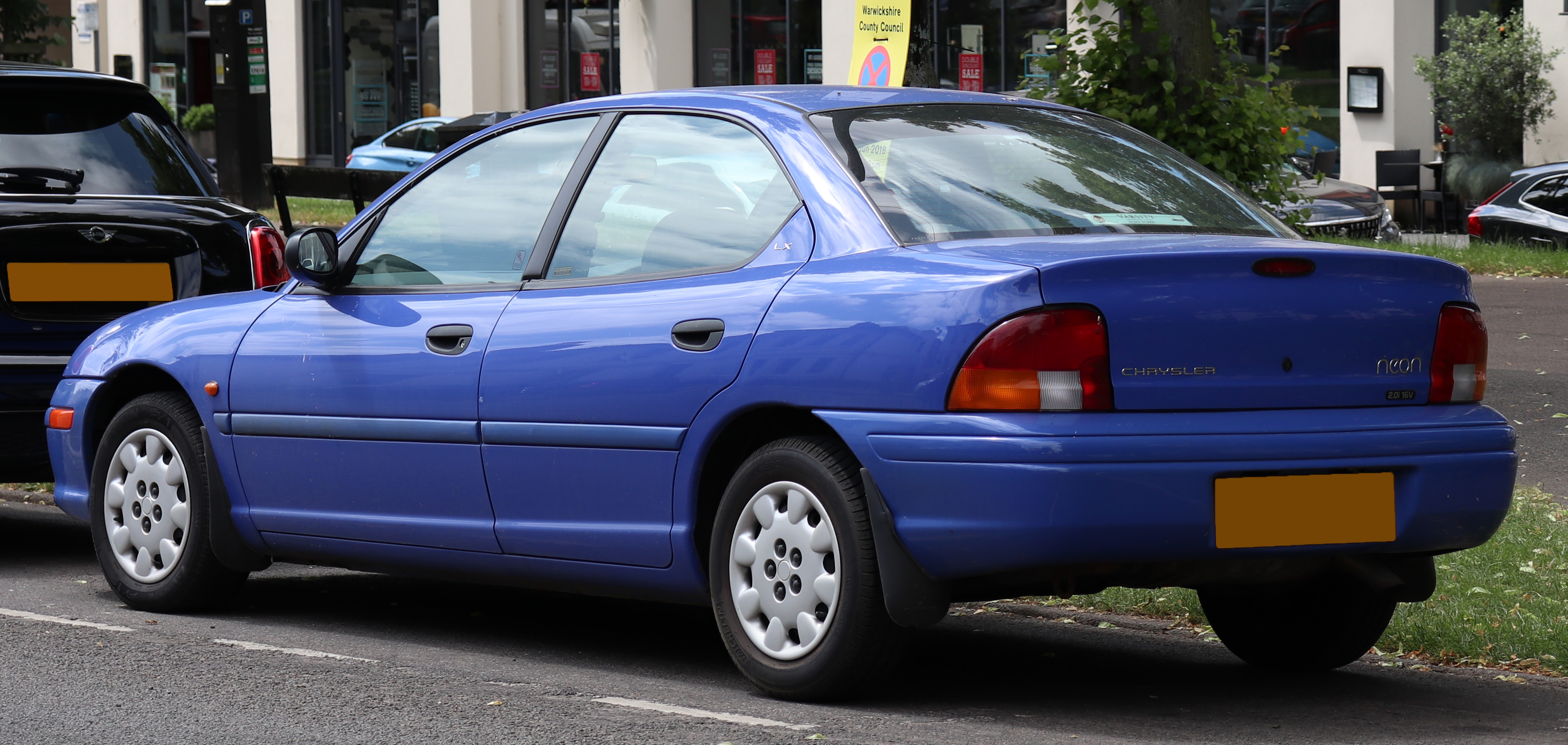
1997 Chrysler Neon LX saloon (UK)

=== Special models ===
==== ACR ====
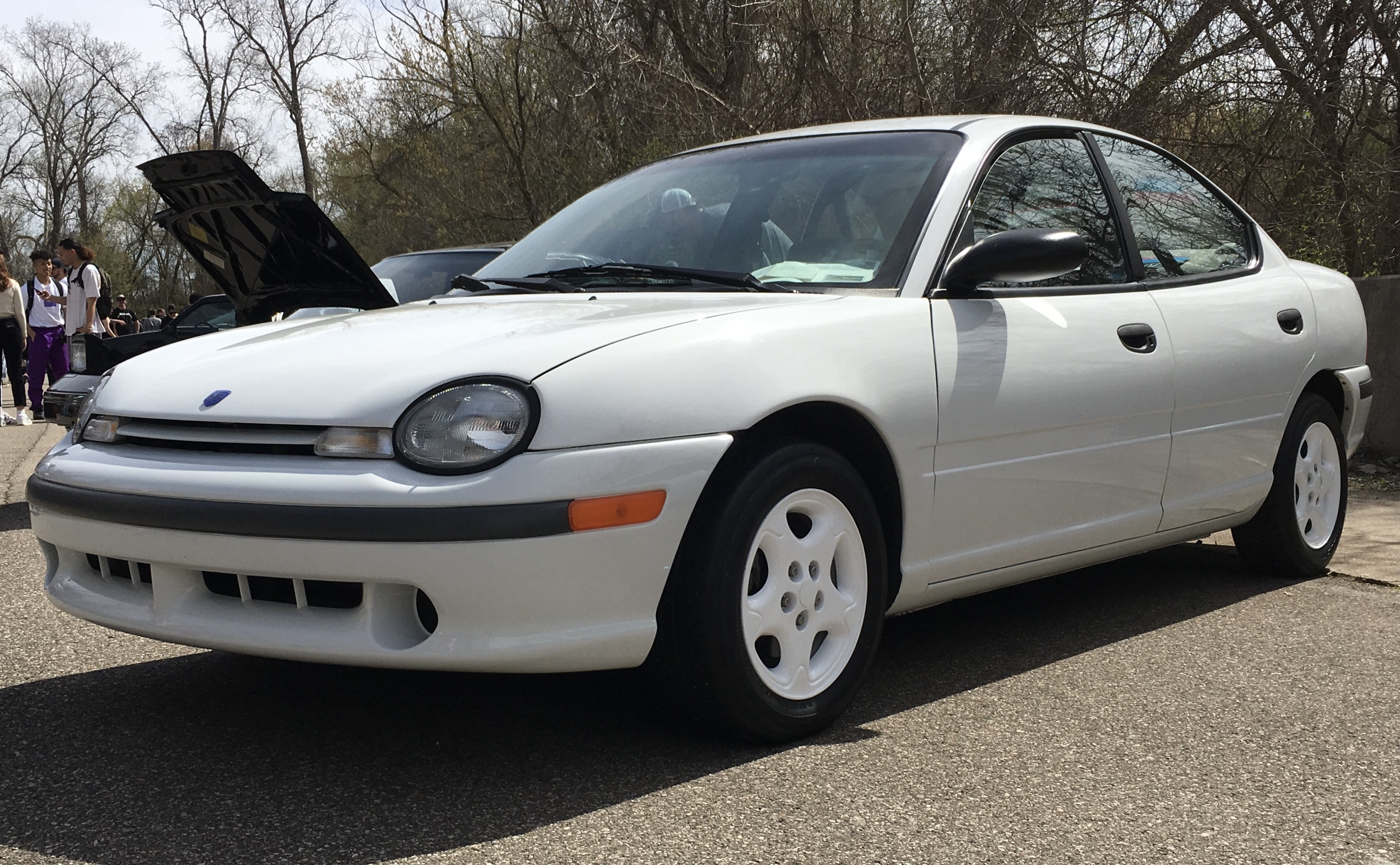
Dodge Neon ACR sedan

The Neon ACR was offered as a coupe with the DOHC engine or sedan with the SOHC engine, and featured four-wheel disc brakes, Arvin non-adjustable struts for 1995–1996 models and Koni adjustable dampers for 1997–1999 models, thicker anti-sway bars, stiffer suspension bushings, fast-ratio steering, heavy-duty wheel hubs, aluminum wheels with performance tires and a five-speed manual transmission with a shorter .81 fifth gear and final drive ratio of 3.94 for quicker acceleration. 1995 through 1999 models featured adjustable camber. The computer-controlled speed limiter was removed from 1995 ACR models (limited to 130 mph (209 km/h) on later models), as well as ABS and the remote trunk lid release, to save weight. Additionally, both the standard A/M-F/M radio with cassette player and air conditioning could be deleted, both for credit. The ACR offers no badging to distinguish it from other Neon models; the only visible differences are a bumper with fog light holes, but no fog lights and a lack of side moldings. For the late 1994 model year debut, the ACR was only offered to SCCA members, and fewer than 200 were built. In subsequent years, though, it was available to the general public. The name "ACR" was initially the internal ordering code for the "Competition Package", as it was termed in dealer materials; however, as knowledge of the model spread, the ACR name stuck. The backronym "American Club Racer" was coined due to its popularity with club and grassroots racers.

==== R/T ====
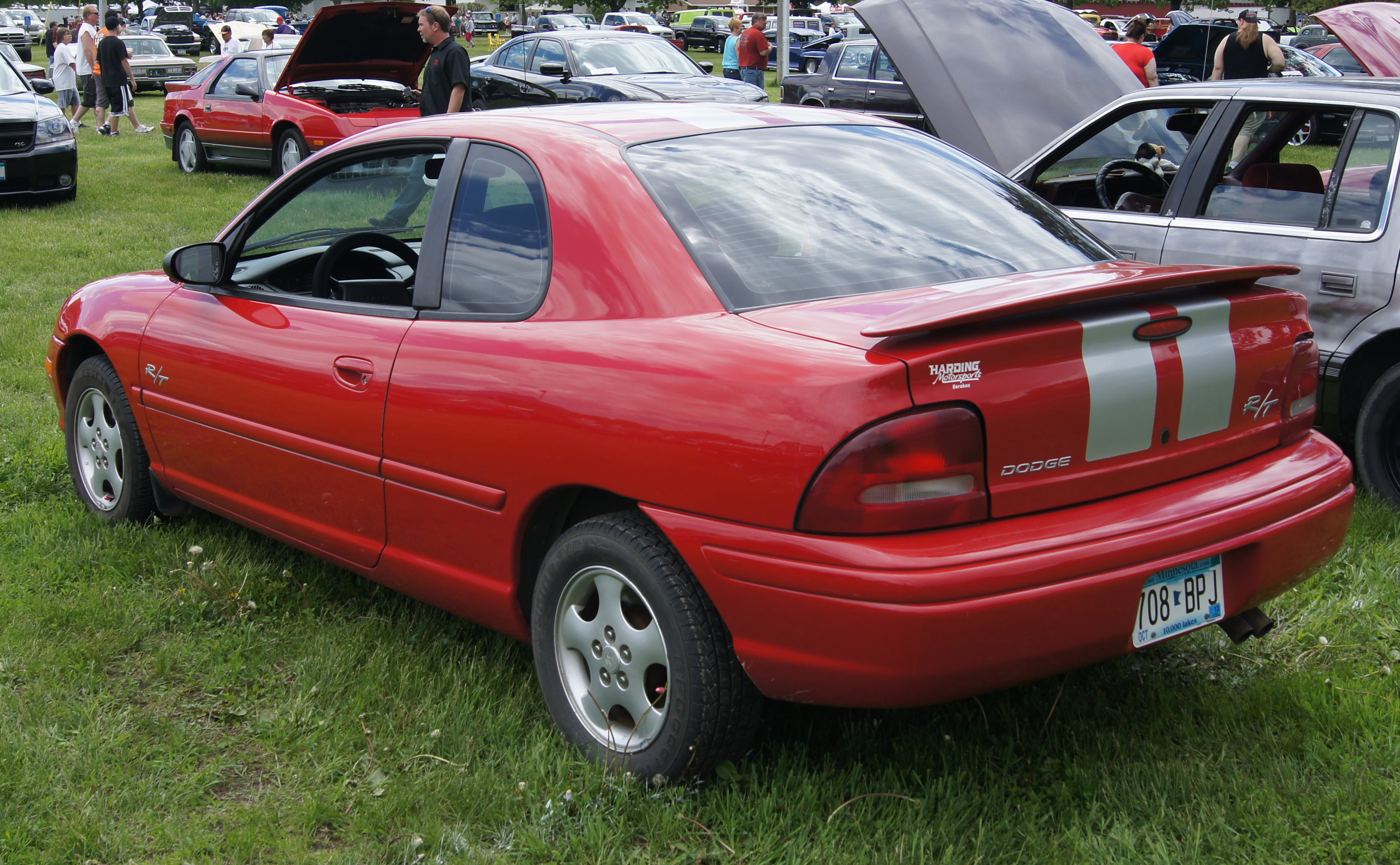
1998 Dodge Neon R/T coupe

The R/T model (Road/Track) debuted in the 1998 model year in both 2 and 4-door bodystyles. Offered only with the 2.0 L DOHC engine and 5-speed manual transmission combination, the R/T featured many of the ACR's mechanical upgrades including the numerically higher ratio 3.94 5-speed manual transmission, with the .81 5th gear, faster ratio steering and 130 mph speed limit. The R/T, however, was intended for the street, with more comfort and convenience features standard or available, and some specialized parts like the adjustable dampers removed, although the dampers, as well as the front coil springs found on R/T models, were slightly stiffer, offering an advantage over standard model Neons. The anti-roll bars were also thicker than the standard Neon, and the R/T featured four-wheel disc brakes and aluminum wheels. R/Ts featured optional stripes over the top of the car, silver "R/T" badging on the front door panels and the right side of the trunk deck lid, body-colored doorhandles and a rear wing. The interior featured sports seats, a unique fabric, and a leather-wrapped steering wheel and shift knob. The "Stripe Delete" option was available from the factory, but with no reduction to the Neon's price. All striped R/Ts (black, red, blue) had silver-colored stripes, with the exception of the white R/Ts, which came with dark blue colored stripes.

== Second generation (2000) ==
Second generation
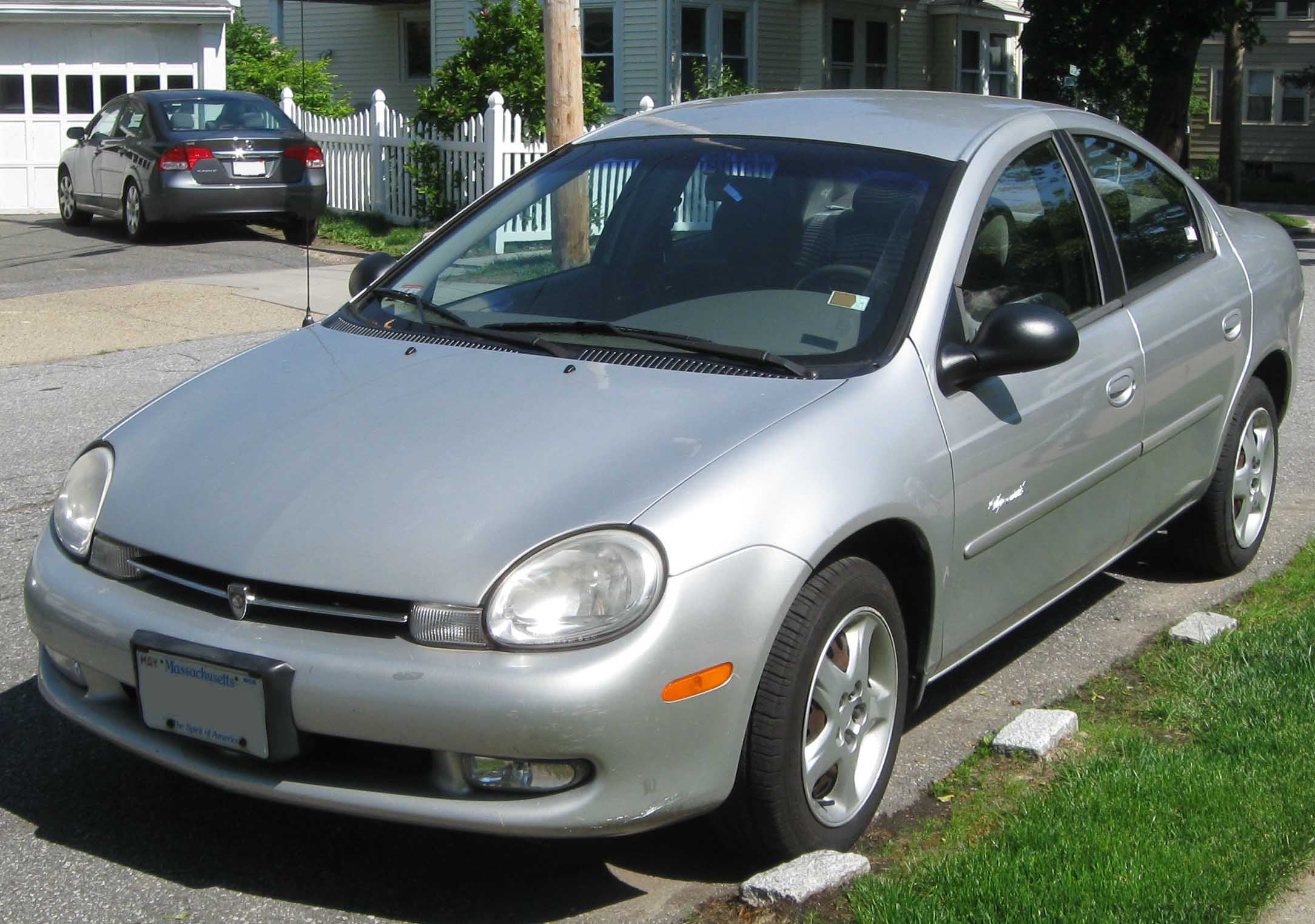
- Plymouth Neon (second generation)

Overview
- Also called: Chrysler Neon; Dodge Neon; Plymouth Neon (1999–2001); Dodge SX 2.0
- Production: January 1999 – September 2005
- Assembly: United States: Belvidere, Illinois (Belvidere Assembly); Mexico: Toluca, Mexico State (Toluca Car Assembly)
- Designer: Robert McMahan; Bob Boniface (1996)

Body and chassis
- Body style: 4-door sedan
- Related: Dodge SRT-4

Powertrain
- Engine: 1.6 L EJD I4; 2.0 L A588 I4; 2.4L EDV/EDT turbo I4
- Transmission: 5-speed NVG T-350 manual; 3-speed TorqueFlite 31TH automatic; 4-speed Ultradrive 40TE automatic; 4-speed Ultradrive 41TE automatic

Dimensions
- Wheelbase: 105.0 in (2,667 mm)
- Length: 174.4 in (4,430 mm)
- Width: 67.4 in (1,712 mm)
- Height: 56.0 in (1,422 mm)

Sales of the second generation model started with the 2000 model year and production ended with the 2005 model year. The second-generation Neon was only available as a four-door sedan. In some global sales regions, including the U.S., the sole engine was the 2.0 L SOHC engine, the power output remaining at 132 hp (98 kW). An optional Magnum engine configuration (with an active intake manifold, and other engine revisions to increase power) that produced 150 hp (112 kW) was available.

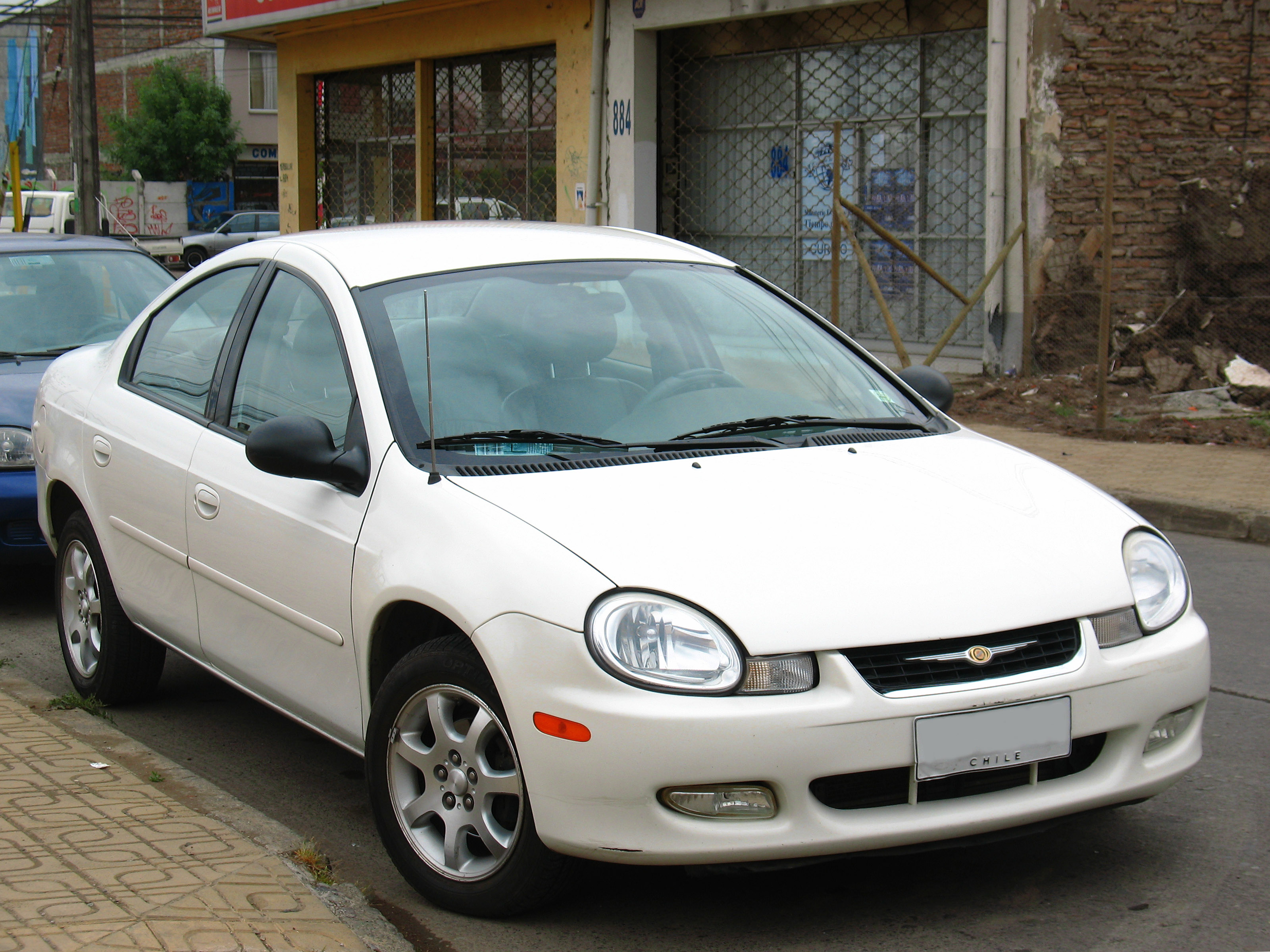
Chrysler Neon

The second generation was more refined than the first-generation car. It was advertised that the second-generation Neon had over 1,000 refinements from the original generation. The first generation's frameless windows were replaced with a full-framed door. Other NVH refinements were implemented. The new interior and greater size increased weight. The DOHC engine (Chrysler code name ECC) was no longer available.

In 2000, the R/T trim returned after a one-year hiatus. The R/T consisted of a new 150 hp (112 kW) SOHC Magnum 2.0 L Engine, 16 in (41 cm) wheels, spoiler, dual chrome exhaust tips, quicker steering box, and stiffer springs. The 2001 and 2002 R/Ts had a flat, 'hammerhead' spoiler. From 2000 to 2003, the R/T was sold as a Chrysler in the United Kingdom. The Neon was offered with a sport package for the 2001 model year only commemorating Dodge's return to the NASCAR scene, called the Motorsports Edition. It was available on SE, ES, and R/T and on SE/ES models, consisted of an R/T wing, R/T 16 in (41 cm) wheels, R/T springs, Goodyear NASCAR raised yellow-lettering tires, 'Dodge Motorsports' side decals, white instrument cluster, and R/T steering box. SE and ES cars were an R/T visually except for the lack of dual exhaust, R/T lower moldings, fog lamps, and R/T exclusive front bumper. The SE and ES only came equipped with the base model's 132 hp (98 kW) engine and was available with an automatic transmission (unlike the manual-only R/T model), the R/T retained the 150 hp Magnum engine. In 2001, there was also a Sport Appearance Package available on SE and ES, which added the R/T wing and 16” wheels as well as other option availability. 2001 was the last year for the Plymouth Neon, and the Plymouth brand as well. The last Plymouth Neon, which was also the last Plymouth ever produced (a silver four-door sedan), rolled off the assembly line on June 28, 2001.

The former Dodge and Plymouth Neon were briefly sold under the Chrysler name in Canada from 1999 until 2002, until being renamed as Dodge SX 2.0 for 2003. As before, in Europe, Australia, Mexico, Asia, South Africa and South America, it continued to be sold as a Chrysler, as Dodge and Plymouth passenger cars were not marketed outside the U.S. and Canada at the time. Besides the 2.0 L engine, it used the same Tritec 1.6 L unit found in the MINI prior to 2007. The 1.6 L unit is a variation of the 2.0 L SOHC engine designed by Chrysler and built by Tritec.

Originally, the second-generation Neon featured a five-speed manual transmission using the former ACR gear ratios to improve acceleration. However, this hurt gas mileage and made the car noisier on the highway, and eventually, the original gear ratios were restored. A four-speed automatic (41TE) was offered in the Neon for the 2002 model year, and the 03-05 received an updated 40TE four-speed auto, replacing the earlier 3-speed 31TH.

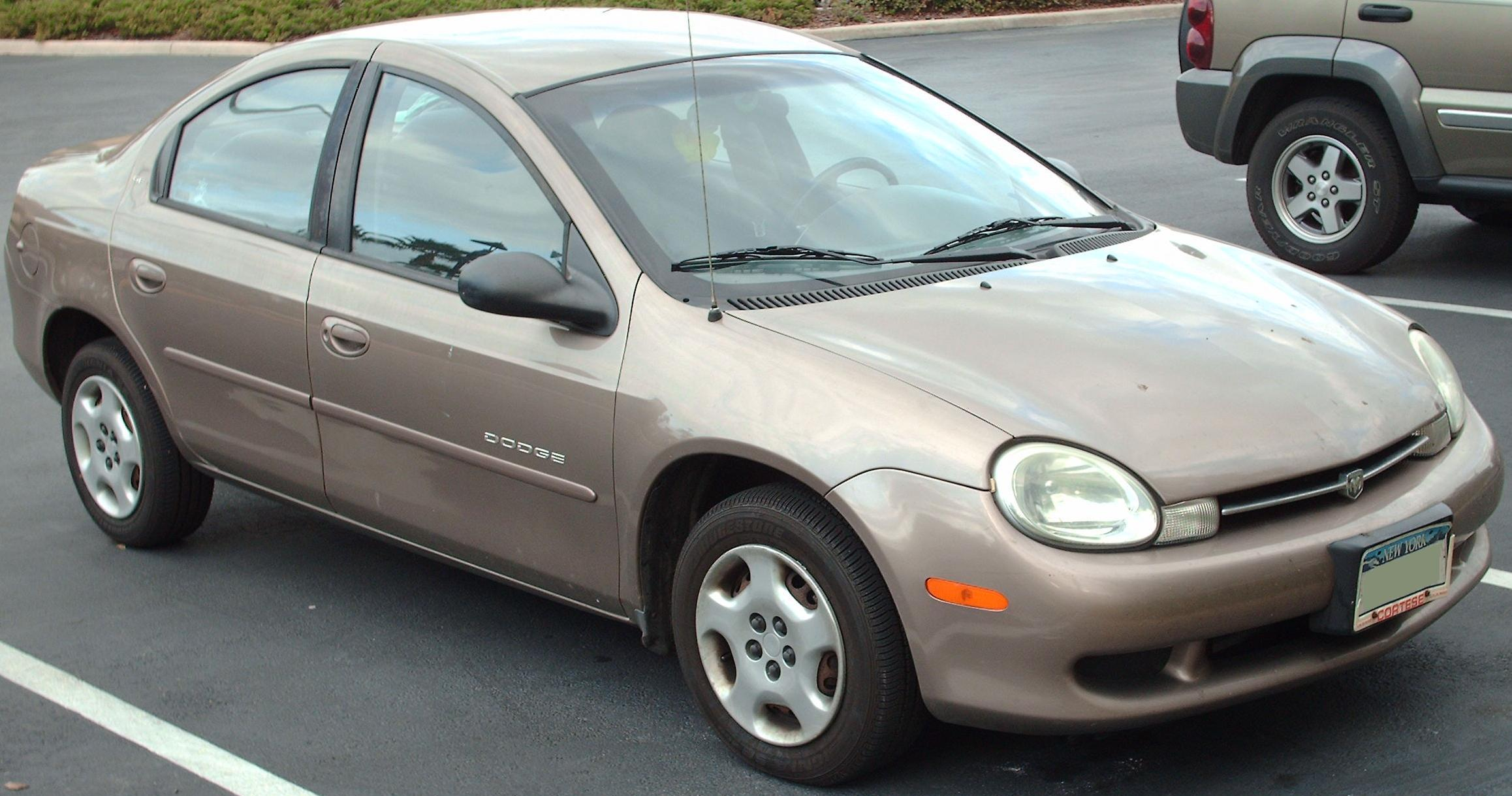
Dodge Neon 2000-2002

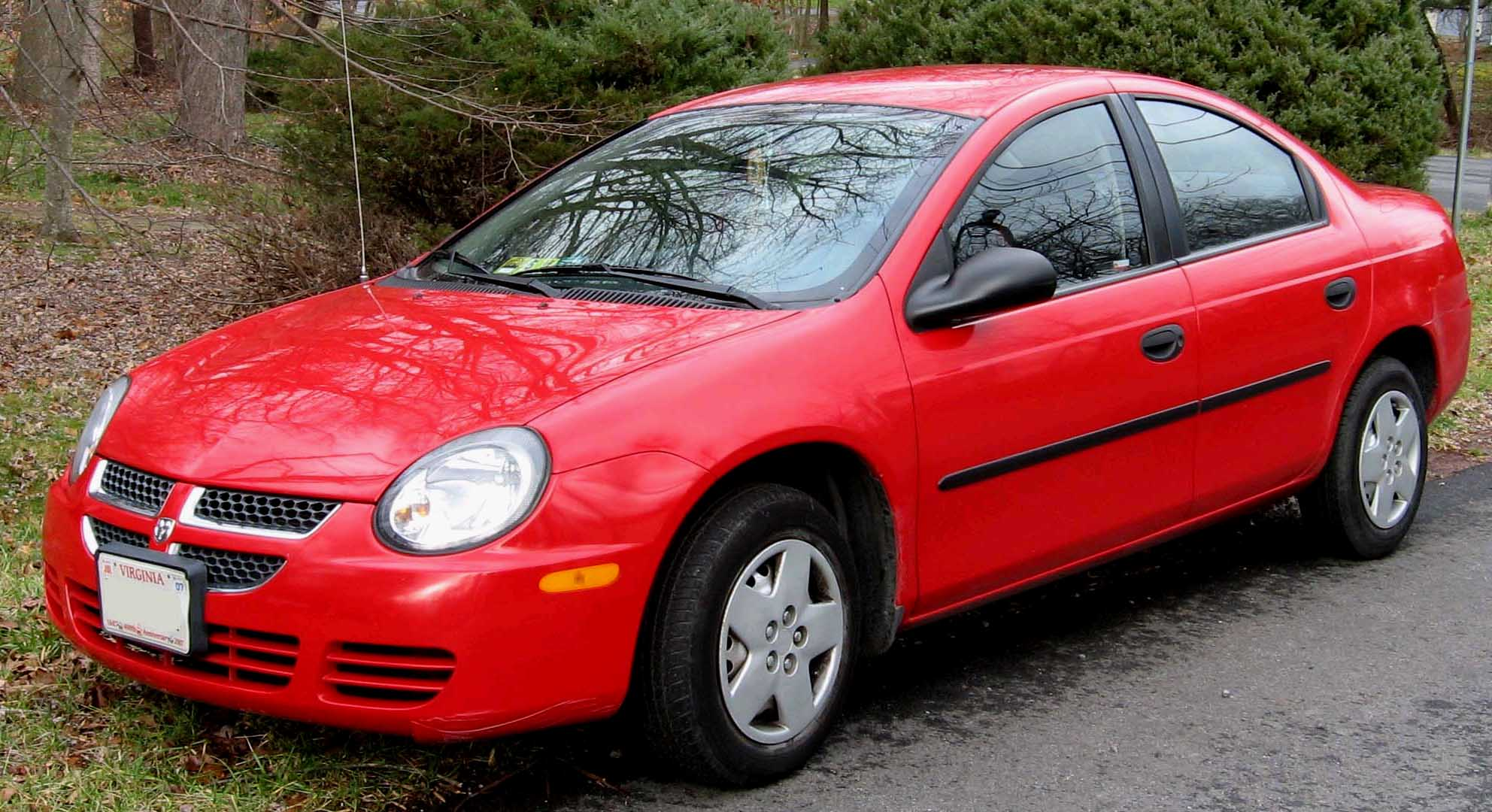
2003–2005 Dodge Neon (US)

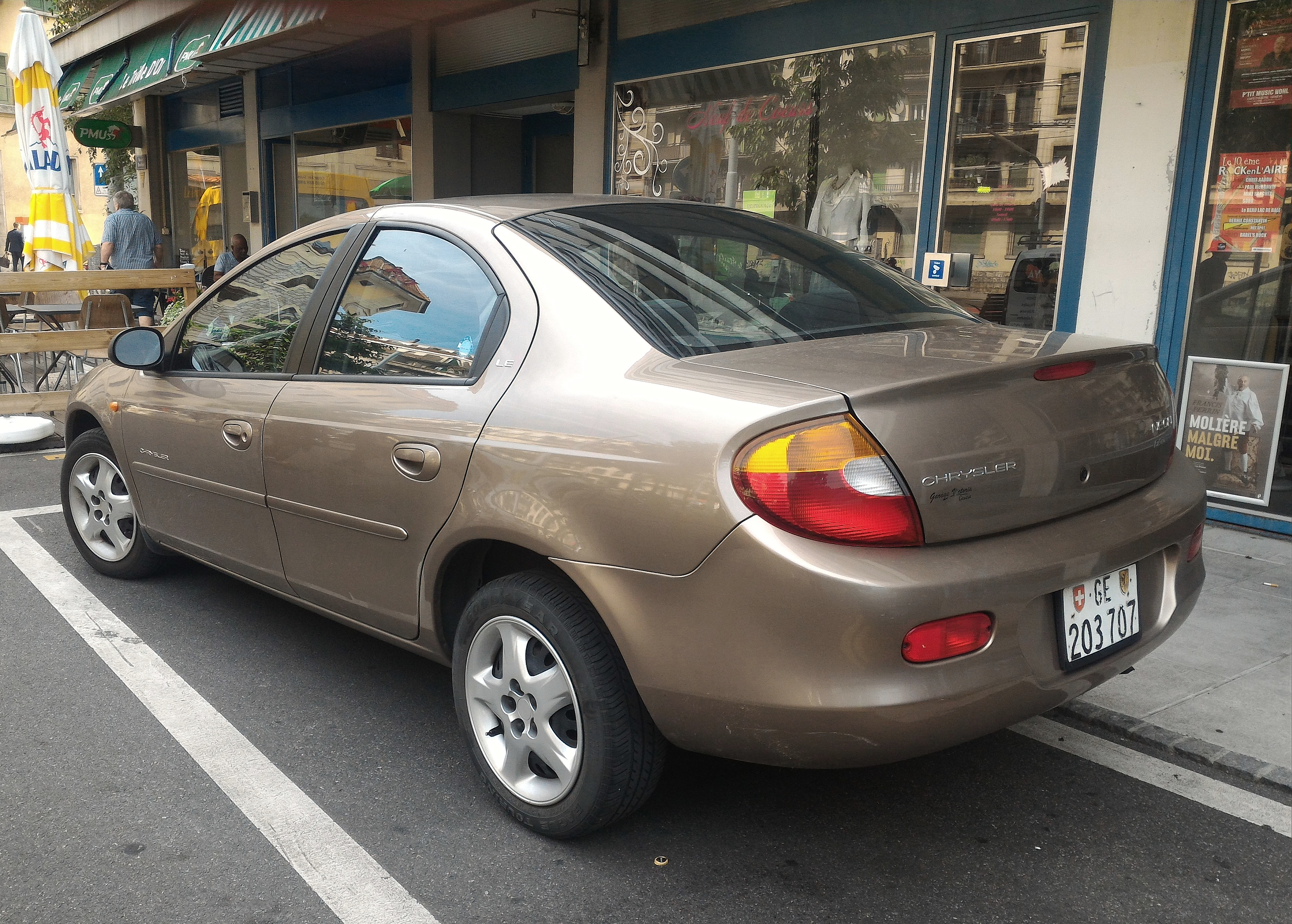
Chrysler Neon rear view

The Chrysler Neon was renamed Dodge SX 2.0 in Canada for 2003 and sold at Dodge dealerships. In Australia and Canada, the Chrysler Neon was discontinued in 2002. In 2002, the front clip was changed to match the R/T and ACR front clip with the exception of missing a lower lip.

The Neon was facelifted once again for 2003 with revised headlights and a crosshair grille to make it look more like a Dodge Caravan and Dodge Stratus.

The ACR model was discontinued for 2003; the R/T model for 2004. The Chrysler Neon continued to be sold in Europe until 2004.

=== Export markets ===
The second generation saw limited exports compared to the original Neon.

In Brazil, the Neon was marketed as a luxury mid-size sedan; for Mexico, it was a competitor to the Ford Escort, and sold as a Chrysler with either the 1.6 or 2.0 L engine and European-style taillights (with separate amber indicator lights), except for the R/T model, which was a Dodge, with U.S.-style taillights.

For the Dutch market, the Neon proved more successful than for the rest of the Continent. Trim levels were 2.0 LX and 2.0 SE.

This generation continued to be offered in Japan from 1999 to 2001. The Japanese version was installed with a leather interior and was marketed as a small luxury car to Japanese consumers. In 2002, the Neon was replaced by the Chrysler PT Cruiser in Japan.

=== Trim levels ===
Dodge Neon: 2000–2005

- Highline – 2000–2001- Included 2.0 L 4-cylinder engine, 5-speed manual transmission, AM/FM stereo with cassette player and 4 speakers, 14-inch steel wheels with wheel covers, manual windows, manual door locks, air conditioning, and anti-lock braking system (ABS).
- ES – 2000–2002- Added 15-inch alloy wheels, power door locks, and power front windows to Highline.
- SE – 2001–2005- Basically same features as Highline.
- R/T – 2001–2004- Added color-keyed exterior features and rear spoiler to ES.
- Motorsports Edition – 2001
- ACR – 2001–2002- Stood for American Club Racer.
- base – 2002

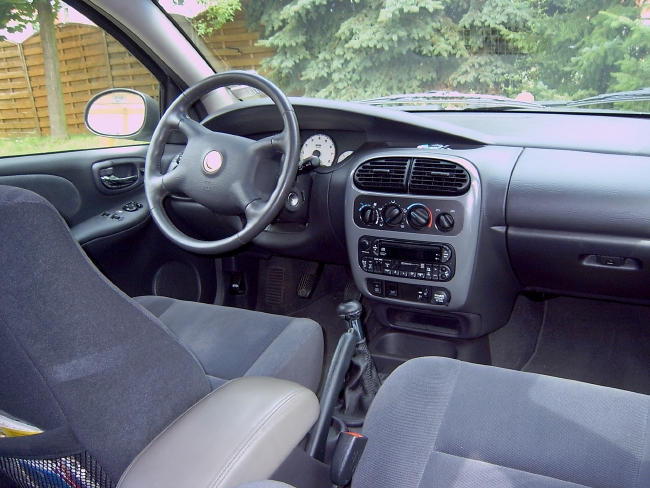
European Chrysler Neon 2000 LE dashboard

- S – 2002
- SXT – 2002–2005- Added 15-inch alloy wheels, AM/FM stereo with single-disc CD player and 6 speakers, rear spoiler, power front windows, keyless entry, and power door locks to SE.
- SRT Design – Had a similar look to the SRT-4 without the side skirts, bumper lips, and top bumper air slots. They came with the standard 2.0L inline-4 that came in normal Neons and the SX 2.0.
- SRT-4 – 2003–2005- A turbocharged and intercooled 2.4 L 4-cylinder gasoline engine (A853 engine), 2.25-inch exhaust with 2 resonators, no muffler, and dual 3.75-inch stainless steel tips, suspension upgrades (stiffer springs and struts, ACR came with adjustable Tokico Illumina struts), larger brakes, 17x6-inch alloy wheels (16x7-inch for ACR), and high-profile rear wing spoiler.

Plymouth Neon: 2000–2001

- Highline – 2000–2001- Included 2.0 L I4 engine, 5-speed manual transmission, AM/FM stereo with cassette player and 4 speakers, 14-inch steel wheels with wheel covers, manual windows, manual door locks, manual air conditioning, and anti-lock braking system (ABS).
- LX – 2000–2001

Chrysler Neon: 2000–2004 (Europe)

- R/T – 2000–2003
- LX – 2000–2004
- SE – 2000–2003

Chrysler Neon: 2000–2002 (Canada)

- LE – 2000–2002 (entry-level trim)
- LX – 2000–2002
- R/T – 2001–2002 (manual transmission only)

=== SX 2.0: 2003-2005 (Canada) ===
The Chrysler Neon was renamed to the Dodge SX 2.0 for the Canadian market for the 2003 model year and coinciding with the 2003 facelift of the Neon. Aside from badging and minor trim differences, as well as metric instruments, it was identical to the US-market Neon.

=== Final year ===
DaimlerChrysler discontinued the Neon, with the final cars assembled on September 23, 2005, at the Belvidere Assembly plant in Belvidere, Illinois. The Neon was replaced in the spring of 2006 with the 2007 Dodge Caliber, which is based on the shared Chrysler/Mitsubishi Motors GS platform. Like the Neon, the Caliber had an SRT-4 variant, but like the standard Caliber, it used a completely different engine. The Belvidere plant underwent retooling for the Caliber, Jeep Compass, and Patriot.

In markets like Australia, the Neon range was reduced to either 2.0 LX or 2.0 SE models.

=== Safety ===
The first generation Neon earned a "Poor" rating in an offset frontal Crash test conducted by the Insurance Institute for Highway Safety. The second-generation Neon earned a higher "Marginal" rating. The second generation were rated as "Poor" in the side impact crash test (IIHS Safety ratings go from "Poor", to "Marginal", "Acceptable" and "Good"). By comparison, the Chevrolet Cavalier performed worse in the small car category in 2005, the Neon's final year. Other cars made from 2000 to 2005 that were rated "Poor" when tested without optional side airbags included the Ford Focus, Toyota Corolla, Toyota Prius, Mitsubishi Lancer, and Chevrolet Cobalt. No small car made in this period, tested without side airbags, achieved better than a "Poor."

In 2005, the Institute carried out side-impact tests on 14 small car models, simulating an impact with an SUV. Among these, the Neon performed the worst. IIHS stated that the Neon had "...major problems beginning with its structure. This car is a disaster...The structure is poor...If this had been a real driver in a real crash, it's likely it wouldn’t have been survivable...if safety is a priority, the Neon is a small car to be avoided."

Second generation headrests were rated as "Poor".

Driver deaths fatality risks statistics — published by the IIHS — rated the Neon and 15 other vehicles among the "Highest rates of driver deaths.", The Neon had 161 driver deaths per million registered vehicle years, while the average for the Neon class (4-door small) was 103. Other small cars on the list included the Acura RSX (202), Kia Spectra hatchback (191), and the Mitsubishi Eclipse (169).

=== Sales ===
Calendar year	United States	Canada	Total
1994	178,960	N/A	178,960
1995	240,189	N/A	240,189
1996	245,303	N/A	245,303
1997	208,652	N/A	208,652
1998	196,497	N/A	196,497
1999	183,797	N/A	183,797
2000	163,332	N/A	163,332
2001	137,353	N/A	137,353
2002	126,118	N/A	126,118
2003	120,101	N/A	120,101
2004	113,476	14,876	128,352
2005	113,332	15,064	128,396
2006 (leftover 2005 models)	17,239	1,847	19,086
Sales total	2,076,136		

== Third generation (2016) ==
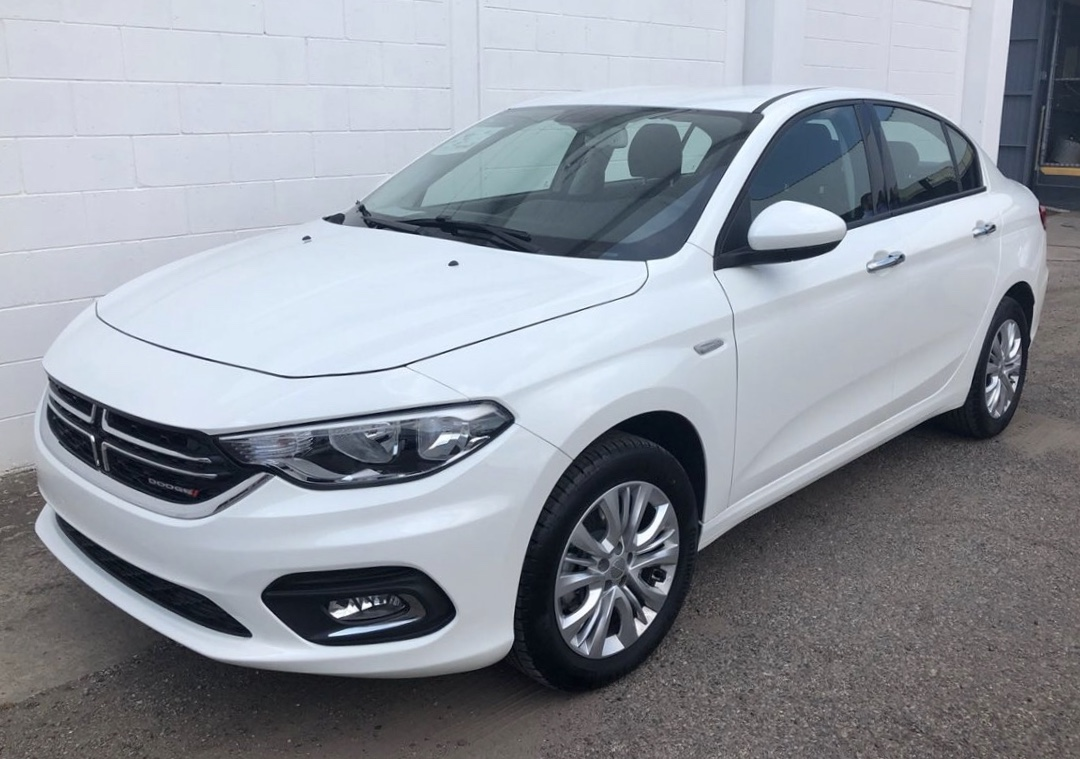
2018 Dodge Neon (Mexico)

The third generation of the Dodge Neon is the sedan version of Fiat's Project Ægea, adapted for the Mexican and Middle Eastern markets as well as marking a comeback of the Neon nameplate after an 11-year absence.

Released for the 2017 model year, the new Neon was positioned for the Mexican market as a "new breed of compact sedan." The new Neon was introduced in 2016, around the same time the Dodge Dart was expected to end production and there were reports that it would be sold in the U.S. and Canadian markets by 2018 as a replacement for the Dart. Consistent with FCA's plans to dedicate U.S. production to Jeep and Ram vehicles while using the North American Free Trade Agreement to make Chrysler and Dodge passenger cars in Canada and Mexico, the Neon was planned to be built and imported from Turkey. Utilizing the Fiat Tipo platform, the cars were co-developed and produced in Tofaş by Fiat and Turkish Koç Holding. Although marketed in Turkey, Europe, and Africa, only Mexico and the Middle East received the Dodge Neon variant.

Plans to market the third-generation Neon vehicle north of Mexico were dropped following General Motors and Ford each paring down their own passenger car lineups in the U.S., including ending sales of potential compact-sized rivals Chevrolet Cruze and Ford Focus in the US and Canada. The Neon was discontinued in Mexico after the 2020 model year, with the final 70 units sold in 2021.

=== Sales ===
Calendar year	Mexico
2016	2,491
2017	5,271
2018	2,289
2019	899
2020	1,025
2021	70
Sales total	12,045
