= Dodge Neon SRT-4 =

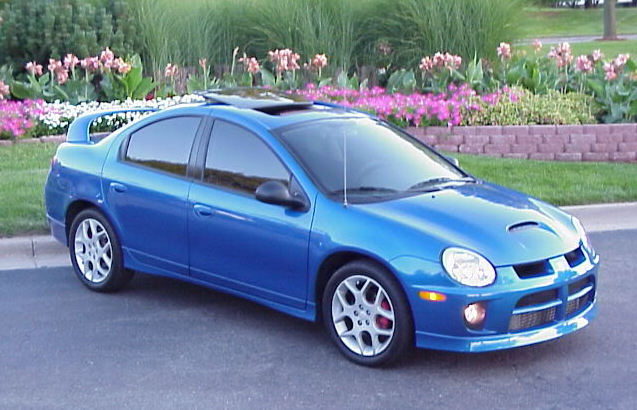

Overview
- Manufacturer: Dodge (DaimlerChrysler)
- Production: 2003–2005
- Assembly: United States: Belvidere, Illinois
- Designer: Eric Stoddard

Body and chassis
- Class: Sport compact
- Body style: 4-door sedan
- Layout: Transverse front-engine, front-wheel drive
- Platform: Chrysler PL platform
- Related: Dodge Neon

Powertrain
- Engine: 2.4 L EDV/EDT I4 (t/c gasoline)
- Transmission: 5-speed NVG T-850 manual

Dimensions
- Wheelbase: 105.0 in (2,670 mm)
- Length: 174.4 in (4,430 mm)
- Width: 67.4 in (1,710 mm)
- Height: 56.0 in (1,420 mm)
- Curb weight: 2,900 lb (1,300 kg)

Chronology
- Successor: Dodge Caliber SRT-4

The Dodge Neon SRT-4 (also known and later labeled as Dodge SRT-4) is a sport compact car manufactured by Dodge from 2003 to 2005. A turbocharged variant of the Neon, the car was developed by DaimlerChrysler's in house PVO (Performance Vehicle Operations) tuner group. PVO was officially renamed SRT (Street and Racing Technology) in 2004. The "4" in the SRT-4's name denotes the number of cylinders of the engine. ACR (American Club Racing) and Commemorative Edition models were later introduced as well.

== History ==
In 1998, Tom Gale, (then Executive Vice President of Chrysler Product Development and Design), attended the 1998 Specialty Equipment Market Association (SEMA) Show in Las Vegas. Gale noted a list of performance features he saw on the sport compact cars at the show, and wanted to integrate those features into Chrysler's compact production car, the Dodge Neon. Gale was the design chief of the original Dodge Viper concept vehicle, and recognized an opportunity to build a sport compact that would appeal to the younger auto generation who grew up on tuner cars, who may prefer a new car with the same performance appeal right off the showroom floor.

A group of young Dodge and Chrysler talent was assembled to put together a vehicle to meet Gale's request, with all of the team members sharing first-hand knowledge and familiarity of the existing Dodge Neon. They created a concept car, the 2000 Neon SRT, in 4 months, with a 2.0 L 16-valve four-cylinder topped with a 45-cubic-inch Eaton supercharger, which produced 208 hp (155 kW) and 180 lb⋅ft (240 N⋅m) of torque at the flywheel on 11 psi (0.76 bar) of boost. (Sport Compact Car magazine tested the car in the Feb. 2001 issue and dynoed 179 hp (133 kW) and 149 lb⋅ft (202 N⋅m) torque at the wheels.)

The group put more than 1000 miles on the test track with the vehicle in under two weeks. In November 1999, the car was shown at the SEMA show with a glowing response. The vehicle was then shown at the Los Angeles Auto Show in January 2000, center stage on a turntable. The team continued to work on the car, to try to bring it to the level of production vehicle, creating a second car using more production-oriented parts in an effort to lower the costs necessary to justify production. They even parked the second car in Gale's parking spot in order to get it noticed. Regardless, in fall of 2000, the executive committee rejected the production car proposal. The team put together a list of reasons why the car was not approved, and worked through the list item by item to find solutions to every issue presented. After three more versions of the car, the company's Specialty Vehicle Engineering (SVE) team took over the project. The executive committee once again considered the vehicle in the spring of 2001, and this time gave the go ahead for the project.

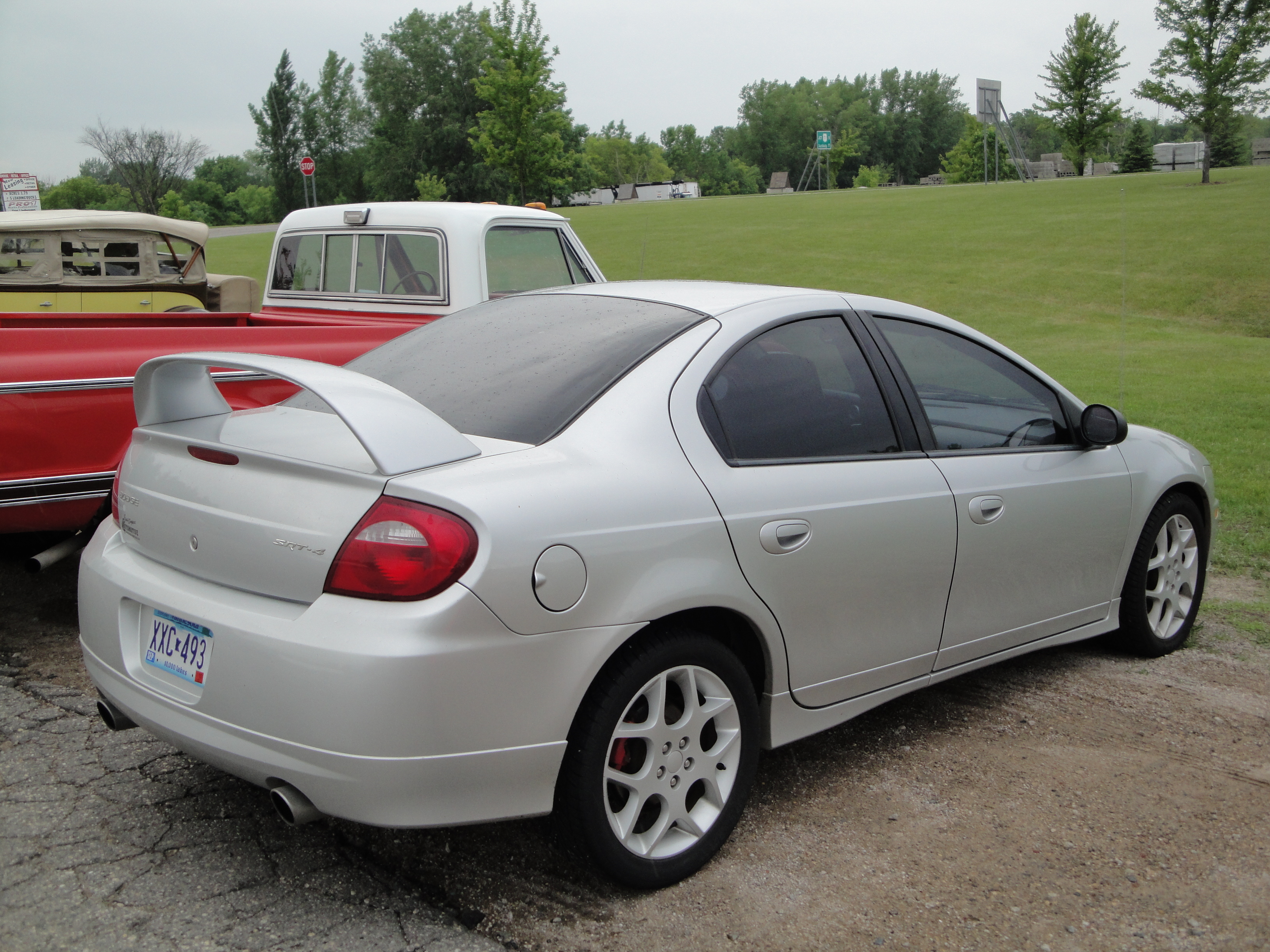
Rear view

In January 2002, SVE became known as Performance Vehicle Operations (PVO). The PVO group was responsible for developing the concept car into a production car. A turbocharged 2.4 liter inline-4 gasoline engine (A853 engine) was used. This engine was nearly identical to the 2003 Chrysler PT Cruiser (A855 engine), except the SRT-4 did not have the unique intake manifold required to fit the engine into the PT Cruiser engine bay. The car was then given a New Venture Gear T-850 five-speed manual transmission (based on the unit from the European turbodiesel minivans), equal-length half shafts, and a high capacity Sachs performance clutch. The suspension had stiffer springs, SRT-tuned Tokico struts (with travel reduced to provide clearance for the larger wheels), and larger front and rear sway bars were added. A unique steering gear, PT Cruiser steering knuckles, and an updated K member were also incorporated. Front brakes used 11.0 in (280 mm) vented disc brakes with extra thick rotors to prevent warping, and 10.6 in (270 mm) non-vented disc brakes in the rear, with single piston calipers (57mm front, 36mm rear).

17 x 6 inch cast aluminum wheels were used, with an offset of 43mm, along with 205/50/17 Michelin Pilot Sport performance tires. The wheels were designed with a unique spoke pattern to allow for improved airflow to the brakes, and were similar to that of the TSW VX1 wheels used on the original 2000 Neon SRT. Unique side skirts, rear fascia, and a large rear wing (spoiler) were used to upgrade the exterior look of the vehicle. The cooling ducts (front nostrils) were added to the pre-production car in late 2002 on the front fascia to help reduce temperatures in the engine bay of the vehicle.

On the interior, the standard agate-colored front seats were modeled after the Dodge Viper SRT-10 seats, and featured enhanced lumbar and lateral side bolsters to stabilize occupants during performance driving. In 2004, base Neon side airbag seats were added as an option. A faux carbon fiber steering wheel and shift boot were used, along with a satin silver “cue ball” type shift knob and silver aluminum floor pedals. Unique gauge designs in the SRT-4 (which were exclusive to the SRT lineup) featured special silver faces with satin silver ring accents, and the SRT-4 logo on the facing. The same satin metal trim was also featured on the instrument panel center stack, climate control knobs and on the door handles. A silver (white in early 2003 models) Auto-Meter brand turbo boost/vacuum gauge was set to the right of the instrument cluster. Like all other Neon models, the SRT-4 had power front windows, and manual rear windows, a costs saving feature. Overall, the vehicle's entire powertrain (engine and transmission), suspension, braking system, exhaust, wheels, and tires were upgraded from that of the base model Neon, along with the interior upgrades. The production model was produced in Belvidere, Illinois, with 84% US content.

In 2003, the Dodge Neon SRT-4 went on sale to the public. At the time, the car was the second fastest stock production vehicle in the Chrysler/Dodge lineup, second only to the Viper. In 2004, PVO changed their name to Street & Racing Technology (SRT), Chrysler's high-performance automotive group. The 2004 model was updated with more power and torque, and included a torque-sensing Quaife limited-slip differential, larger fuel injectors, new engine management software, BF Goodrich g-Force T/A KDW-2 three season ultra-high performance tires, and paint/trim changes. Dodge removed the “Neon” designation from the vehicle in 2004, marketing the car simply as the “SRT-4”. In 2005, an American Club Racer (ACR) package and limited edition numbered Commemorative version of the SRT-4 were also offered.

Initially, Dodge expected to sell a conservative number of only 2,500 units per year. However, during the three year production run (2003 through 2005), more than 25,000 Neon SRT-4s were produced. With the discontinuation of the PL platform after model year 2005, the SRT-4 ceased production. In 2008 Dodge introduced the Caliber SRT-4 as a replacement.

== Performance ==
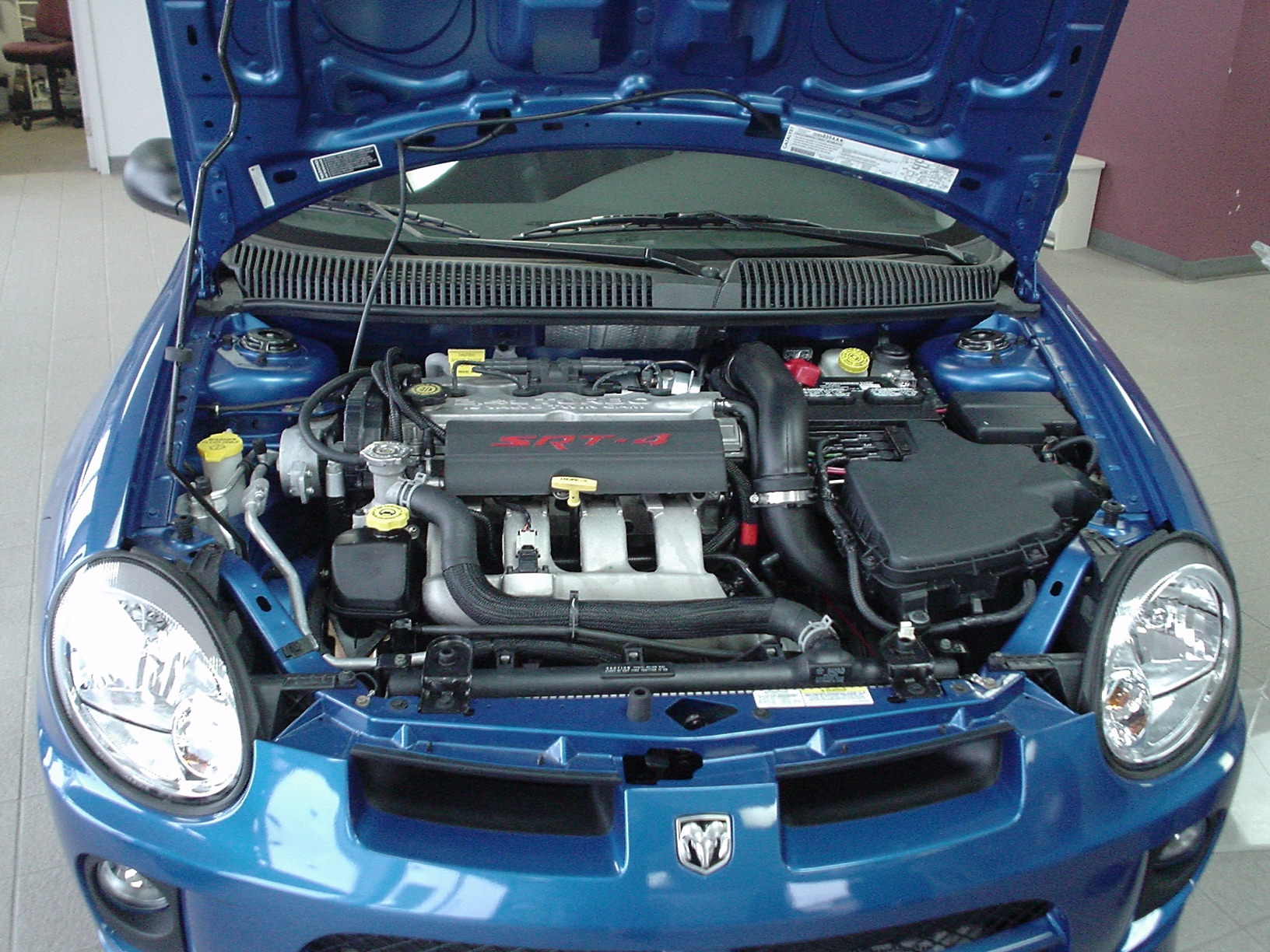
2004 Dodge SRT-4 engine bay

Power:	SAE 215 hp (160 kW) (2003 model); SAE 230 hp (172 kW) (2004–2005 models) In 2004, the SRT-4 received a power increase, with larger fuel injectors and a recalibrated engine computer. Manufacturer's specification when the SRT-4 was released was 230 hp (172 kW). However, several independent tests have produced results indicating 230-238 whp and 250-262 lb-ft. This would indicate that the SRT-4 produces more power than the manufacturer claims. The flywheel power is estimated to be 255–265 hp (190–198 kW) and 260–270 lb⋅ft (353–366 N⋅m)
Torque:	245 lb⋅ft (332 N⋅m) @ 3200-4200 rpm (2003 model); 250 lb⋅ft (339 N⋅m) @ 2400-4400 rpm (2004–2005 models)
0-60 mph (97 km/h) time:	5.6 seconds (2003) 5.3 seconds (2004, 2005)
Rev Limiter/Redline:	6240
1/4 mile (400 m) time:	14.1 seconds (2003) 13.9 seconds (2004, 2005)
1/4 mile speed:	102 mph (164 km/h) (2003) 103 mph (166 km/h) (2004, 2005)
Top speed:	Car and Driver magazine achieved a maximum speed of 153 mph (246 km/h).

== Engine details ==
The SRT-4 used the same basic engine block as the naturally aspirated 2003+ 2.4L, and was different from the years previous used in the naturally aspirated Chrysler 2.4L cars such as the PT Cruiser and four-door Stratus. The SRT4 engine had many improvements, including: stronger crank case webbing, a thicker deck with 11 mm head bolts (vs 10 mm), an oil drain back for the turbo, a cast aluminum structural oil pan, a higher capacity oil pump, a crankshaft of higher hardness steel, improved machining of bearing journals, oil squirters (to cool underside of pistons), eutectic aluminum alloy pistons made specially by Mahle, and forged connecting rods with cracked caps and 9 mm bolts. The cylinder head was also different for turbo engines, from naturally aspirated. The turbo version (PT Cruiser GT Turbo and SRT-4) included: larger diameter valves and seats, exhaust valves made of Inconel, improved cooling and larger oil drain back passages, different camshafts. The PT Cruiser Turbo engine package differs from the SRT-4 because the intake manifold, turbocharger plumbing and intercooler are different. The SRT-4 intercooler was a front-mounted cast aluminum 8-row unit produced by Valeo, unique in its efficiency and computer designed end tanks for air flow.

The turbocharger was a reverse rotation Mitsubishi TD04LR-15Gk with a 6 cm^{2} (0.93 sq in) turbine inlet. Tight packaging forced some creative thinking on the turbocharger. The TD04 compressor has a compressor bypass valve built right into the compressor housing. The exhaust manifold and turbine housing were cast in one piece by Mitsubishi from high-nickel Ni-Resist steel. The one-piece design improved flow, reduced size and reduced thermal mass for quicker cat light-off. The turbine discharge was also part of the manifold/turbine housing casting, and it looped back around and hit the manifold again on its way to the catalytic converter. Where they met, there was a wastegate valve; keeping the wastegate valve away from the turbine housing improved flow where it mattered most. Maximum boost in stock form was around 14 psi (97 kPa). Piston velocities and valve-train components force a rev limit of 6240 rpm although MOPAR upped the ante with their Stage 2 and 3 kits which have a rev limit of 6500 rpm.

The exhaust system for the vehicle consists of 2.25-inch (57.15 mm) steel tubing, which is run first through the catalytic converter, then through two resonators. The exhaust then splits into two separate sections of piping, exiting through two 3.75 in (95 mm) stainless steel tips at the rear of the vehicle. The exhaust system is unique in that there is no muffler, instead relying on the turbocharger and resonators to reduce the exhaust volume. The result is a distinctive and audible exhaust note.

	Specifications
Block height:	9.375 in (238.1 mm)
Displacement:	2,429 cc (148.2 cu in)
Stroke:	3.976 in (101.0 mm)
Bore:	3.445 in (87.5 mm)
Rod length:	5.944 in (151.0 mm)
Main journal diameter:	2.36 in (60 mm)
Deck clearance:	0.200 in (5.1 mm)
Combustion chamber volume:	50.0 cc (3.05 cu in)
Head gasket thickness:	0.040 in (1.0 mm)
Compression ratio:	8.1:1

== ACR model ==
This factory competition version included:

- Wider 16×7-inch (410×180 mm) BBS RX racing wheels with 40 mm (1.6 in) offset
- Wider 225/45/16 BFG KDW2 tires
- Lowered ride height (Front: 10 mm (0.39 in) from spring seat lowering, additional 22 mm (0.87 in) through smaller diameter tire; Rear: 23.5 mm (0.93 in) from spring seat lowering, additional 22 mm (0.87 in) through smaller diameter tire)
- 5 position adjustable performance Tokico Illumina dampers. Proportional compression and rebound damping adjustment is accomplished via multiple oil bleed orifices within the damper.
- Thicker rear stabilizer bar (19 mm)
- Stiffer bushings in the rear tension struts
- ACR embroidered, Viper-styled, racing seats with pass-throughs for a racing harness
- ACR decals on the bottoms of the front doors
- Full diameter P205/60R15 spare tire
- Vehicle Speed Sensor gear changed from 20 tooth to 21 tooth to correct speedometer for different stock tire heights.
- There were a total of 1,175 SRT-4 ACR's produced for the public: 225 Flame Red (PR4), 211 Orange Blast (PVK), 306 Stone White (PW1), 433 Black (PX8).

== 2005 Commemorative Edition ==
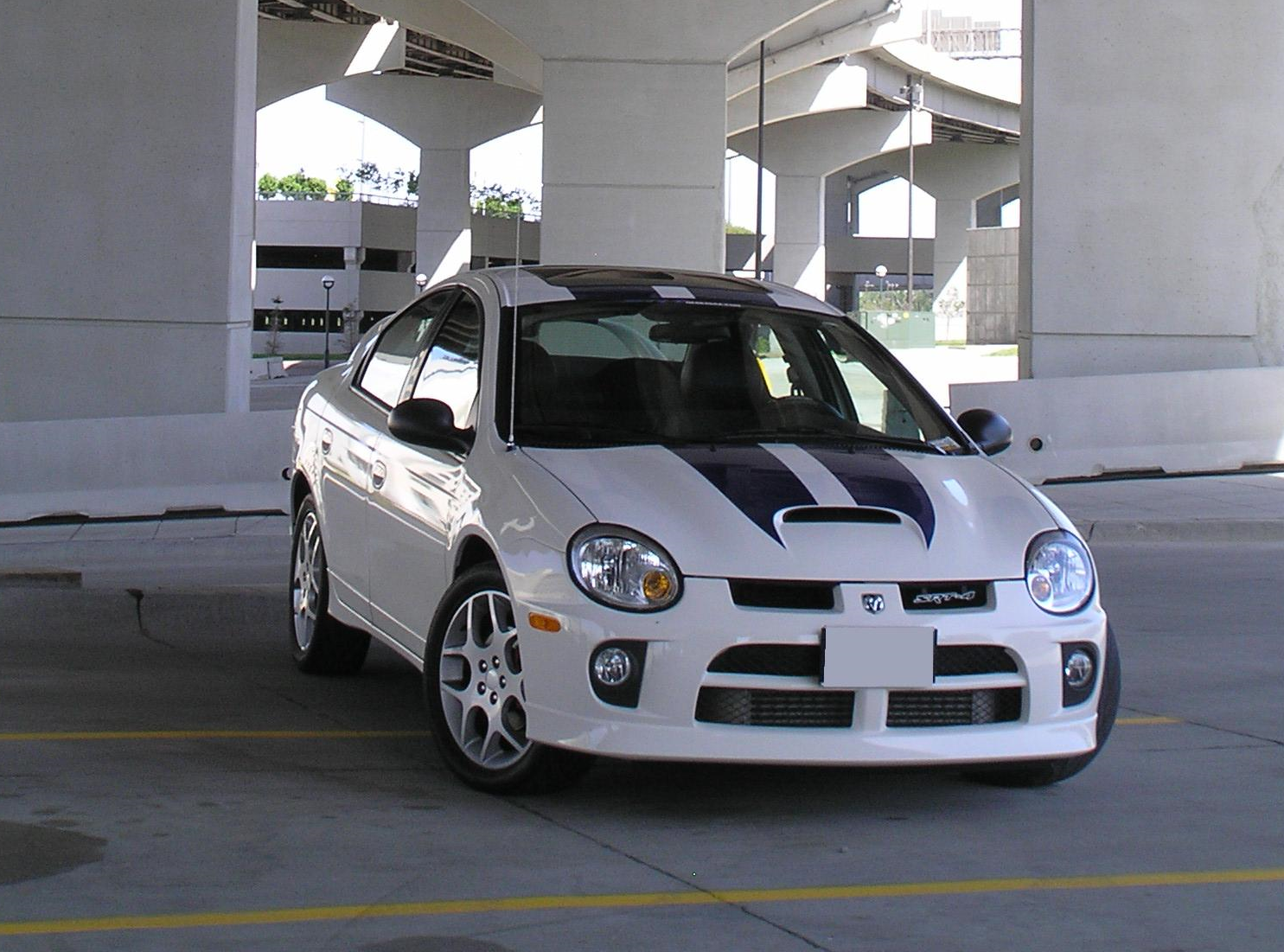
2005 Commemorative Edition Dodge SRT-4

In 2005, Dodge released an SRT-4 Commemorative Edition. This model (along with the Commemorative Edition versions of the Viper SRT-10 and Ram SRT-10) was created to celebrate the SRT vehicles.

This limited, numbered version included:

- "Electric Blue" painted "Viper" stripes over the "Stone White" colored body.
- Blue stitching on the floor mats, shift boots, seats, and steering wheel.
- Stainless steel "SRT-4" door sill plates.
- A total of 200 Commemorative Edition SRT-4's were built.
- A "XXX/200" numbered metal plaque, inset just ahead of the cup holders.
- A Commemorative Edition booklet (same booklet included with the Commemorative Vipers and Ram SRT-10's).
- No performance extras were added on the Commemorative Edition.

== 2003 SRT-4 Extreme LightWeight ==
In 2003, Dodge engineers built a special SRT-4 Extreme LightWeight for the 2003 SEMA show. It was designed to showcase the factory upgrade parts available for the SRT-4 from Mopar. The vehicle featured lightweight, carbon fiber body pieces (produced in-house), a polycarbonate rear window, and the front window glass removed for weight reduction. The interior was stripped completely, with only the stock dash remaining. A single Recaro racing seat, a harness, and a roll cage were installed for safety. The car featured the first stage 3R Mopar engine performance kit and stage 3R coilovers. Overall, the weight of the vehicle was reduced by 405 lb (184 kg) to 2,500 lb (1,134 kg) wet, and was dyno'd at 360 hp (270 kW) and 383 lb•ft (519 N•m) (at the wheels) by Sport Compact Car magazine. On drag slicks, it ran an 11.83-second pass at 123 mph (198 km/h) in 70 °F (21 °C) weather. This one-off SRT-4 was used for media events and testing of the Mopar development parts, and was destroyed as an asset reduction move in 2009.

== Awards ==
- Car and Driver magazine's 2005 John Lingenfelter Memorial Trophy
- Was one of "Eight Great Rides" as decided by Sport Compact Car magazine (SCC) in 2003, 2004, and 2005 - all three years the SRT-4 was produced.
- Named the 2003 Car of the Year by SCC.
- Won numerous comparisons in several U.S. automotive magazines from 2003 to 2005, including:
  - 1st place -, Car and Driver magazine, November 2005. The SRT-4 competed against 14 other performance vehicles, finishing 1st in the front-wheel-drive division.
  - 1st place -, Serial Thrillers comparison test, Car and Driver magazine, May 2004.
  - 1st place -, Automobile magazine, March 2004.
  - 1st place -, Sport Sedans Comparison, Edmunds, August 2003
  - 1st place -, Sport Compact Car Shootout, January 2003.

== Racing ==
In 2003, Cory O'Brien and Erich Heuschele drove an SRT-4 to a 1st in class and 8th overall finish in the Tire Rack Cannonball One Lap of America.

In SCCA ProRally racing, the SRT-4 (and more recently the ACR version) has dominated the Group 5 (2WD) class since 2003. In just its first year competing, the Dodge ended the stranglehold that the FWD DSMs and Volkswagens had on the class. With three competing the following year, the SRT-4 won every 2004 series race and end-of-season award. The SRT-4 has won every Group 5 and 2-Wheel-Drive class championship in US ProRally and Sno Drift since 2003, and its unprecedented dominance in 2004 helped Dodge earn its first US ProRally Manufacturers Championship in 28 years.

In 2005, Jeff Lepper drove the SRT-4 to its first ever national road racing win in the NASA US Touring Car Championship at California Speedway in Fontana.

In 2005, Dale Seeley, Kolin Aspergren, and Jamin Cummings drove an SRT-4 to a 1st in class and 8th overall finish in the Tire Rack Cannonball One Lap of America.

In 2006, the Dodge SRT-4 officially became the world's fastest production 4-cylinder car, averaging 221 mph (356 km/h) at the Bonneville Salt Flats in Utah in a car driven by Jorgen Moller. The vehicle was tuned by Dave Harris and Phil Hurst for Racedeck Racing.

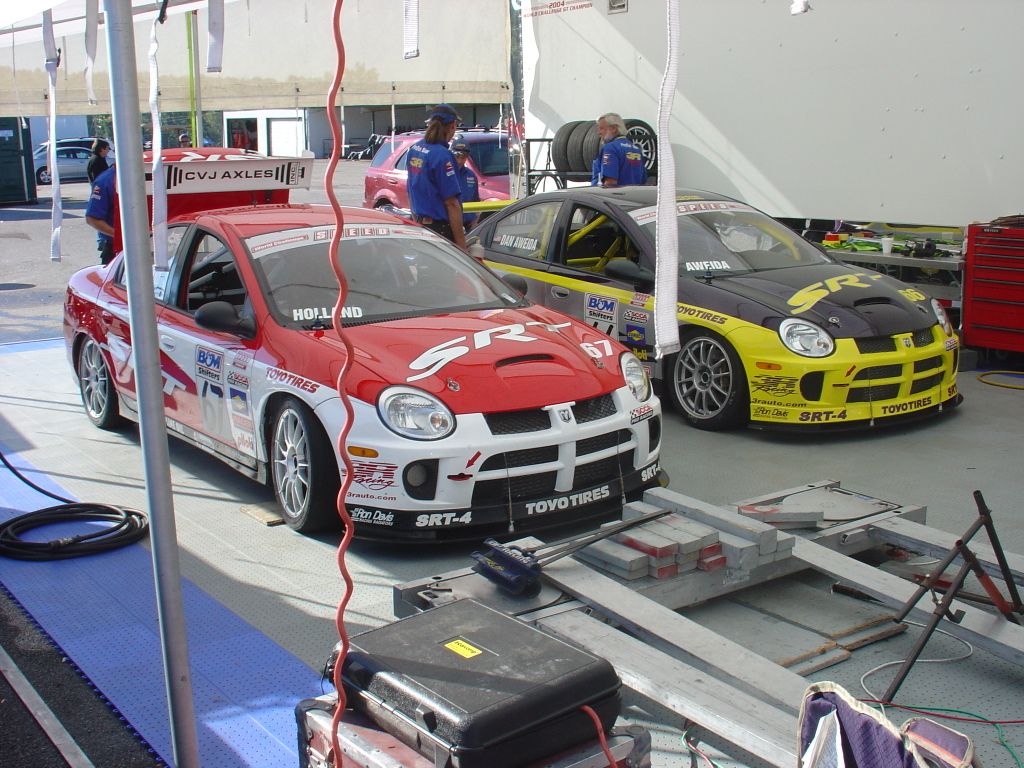
Robb Holland and Dan Aweida's SPEED World Challenge SRT-4s

Multiple SRT-4s were raced in the SCCA SPEED World Challenge – Touring Car Series, and in 2006 – their second year of competition – had become one of the more successful platforms in the series. Robb Holland, of 3R Racing, became the first Pro driver to put the SRT-4 on the podium with his 3rd-place finish at Road America in August 2006. This was Dodge's first podium and first manufacturer's points in World Challenge Touring Car competition. Holland would finish the season with 3 top 10 finishes and two top 5 qualifying efforts in the SRT-4.

In 2007, Doug Wind, Devin Clancy, and Ken Brewer drove an SRT-4 to a 1st in class and 5th overall finish in the Tire Rack Cannonball One Lap of America.

In 2007, George Biskup drove an SRT-4 Neon to several SCCA T-2 National wins, and set the Track Qualifying Record at Road America. His lap time of 2:33.922 remained the record for several years. Earlier in 2005, Biskup won the first SCCA National race he entered at Gingerman Raceway. Due to snowy conditions, the race was run under yellow and finishing positions were as qualified, Biskup's SRT-4 was on the pole with the fastest qualifying time.

In 2007, Curt Simmons won the U.S. Touring Car Championship in an SRT-4 and Dodge won the season manufacturers points championship by 29 points over Honda behind the strength of several SRT-4's.

In 2007, Stan Wilson won the Speed World Challenge Touring Car Rookie Driver of the Year and the Sunoco Hard Charger of the Year awards driving the Sorted Performance Dodge SRT-4. This was Dodge's first title in Speed World Challenge Touring Car.

In 2008, Curt Simmons attempts to defend his USTCC series championship, winning on June 29, 2008, at Infineon Raceway in Sonoma, CA.

In 2012, Russ Deane set a new world land speed record for four-cylinder production cars (SRT-4) of more than 226 mph (364 km/h). He surpassed the previous record of 224 mph for a Class F/PS vehicle. Deane and his Hinckley Automotive race team were participating in Speed Week at the Bonneville Salt Flats. His race team included Jim Hinckley, Dave Harris (chief), Craig Ohlson, "Camel" Joe George, Troy Cheney, Stuart Gosswein, and Jim Hinckley Jr.
