= Dodge Caliber =

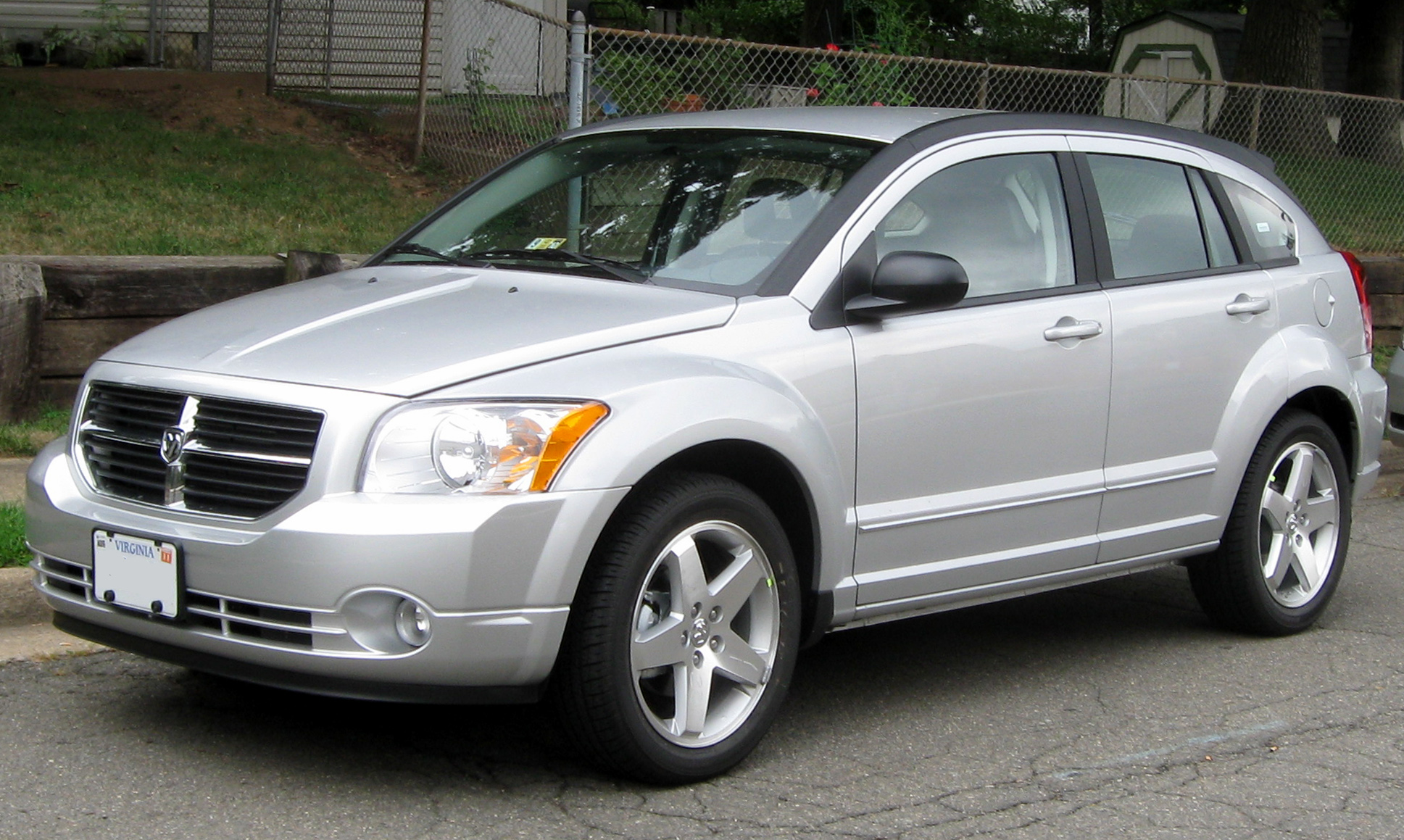

Overview
- Manufacturer: Dodge (Note: DaimlerChrysler (2006–2007); Chrysler LLC (2007–2009); Chrysler Group LLC (2009–2011))
- Production: March 2006 – November 2011
- Model years: 2007–2012
- Assembly: United States: Belvidere, Illinois; Venezuela: Valencia, Carabobo
- Designer: Mike Nicholas (2005)

Body and chassis
- Class: Compact car
- Body style: 5-door hatchback
- Layout: Front-engine, front-wheel drive / all-wheel drive
- Platform: Chrysler PM/MK platform
- Related: Jeep Compass; Jeep Patriot; Mitsubishi ASX

Powertrain
- Engine: 1.8 L GEMA World I4 (gasoline); 2.0 L GEMA World I4 (gasoline); 2.0 L VW EA188 CRD PD I4 (turbo-diesel); 2.4 L GEMA World I4 (gasoline); 2.4 L GEMA World I4 (turbo gasoline)
- Transmission: 5-speed Magna T355 manual; 6-speed Aisin BG6 manual; 6-speed Getrag DMT6 manual; CVT Jatco JF011E automatic

Dimensions
- Wheelbase: 103.7 in (2,635 mm)
- Length: 173.8 in (4,415 mm)
- Width: 68.8 in (1,748 mm)
- Height: 60.4 in (1,534 mm); SRT-4: 59.7 in (1,516 mm)
- Curb weight: 3,052 lb (1,384 kg)

Chronology
- Predecessor: Dodge Neon; Dodge Neon SRT-4 (Caliber SRT4); Chrysler PT Cruiser (Car platform)
- Successor: Dodge Dart (PF)

The Dodge Caliber is a compact hatchback manufactured and marketed by Chrysler's Dodge division from the 2007 through 2012 model years, replacing the Dodge Neon and Chrysler PT Cruiser.

Following the Caliber concept, which debuted at the 2005 Geneva Motor Show, the pre-production version debuted at the 2006 North American International Auto Show, with a market launch in March 2006.

The Caliber was manufactured at the Belvidere Assembly (Illinois) plant, and across its six-year model run, just over 400,000 were produced.

== Marketing ==
The Caliber was one of Dodge's first modern offerings in European and Asian markets, such as Japan, South Korea, and Singapore, as it established new distribution channels there. It was also introduced in China in 2008 as Dodge's second modern vehicle offering in that market. Dodge vehicles were previously officially sold in China during World War II. The introduction of the Caliber marked the return of the Dodge brand to Australia since the early 1970s.

The Caliber in Japan joined the local line-up alongside the Chrysler PT Cruiser in 2007, as the PT Cruiser was offered since 2000.

The marketing plan for the first year of Caliber's production included 20% of the budget for online marketing, print ads, and TV commercials.

== Features ==
The Dodge Caliber offered a continuously variable transmission (called CVT2 by Dodge) sourced from Jatco (a Nissan subsidiary), the second DaimlerChrysler model to employ this technology after the Mercedes-Benz A-Class. It uses a four-cylinder 1.8-2.4 L World gasoline engine designed jointly by Chrysler, Mitsubishi, and Hyundai.

The car features an optional electronically controlled all-wheel drive system with variable torque at speeds of 25 to 65 mph (40 to 105 km/h) for optimal handling.

The Caliber uses a heavily modified GS platform, co-designed with Mitsubishi Motors. The modified GS platform is now called the JS platform by Chrysler for mid-size cars and PM/MK for compact cars. It shares a portion of the platform with the Mitsubishi Lancer, but is most similar to the Jeep Compass and Jeep Patriot. The Caliber wheels have a five-hole pattern with a 114.3 mm bolt circle.

=== Models ===
Three models were available at the Caliber's launch, with a fourth available in mid-2006.

==== SE ====
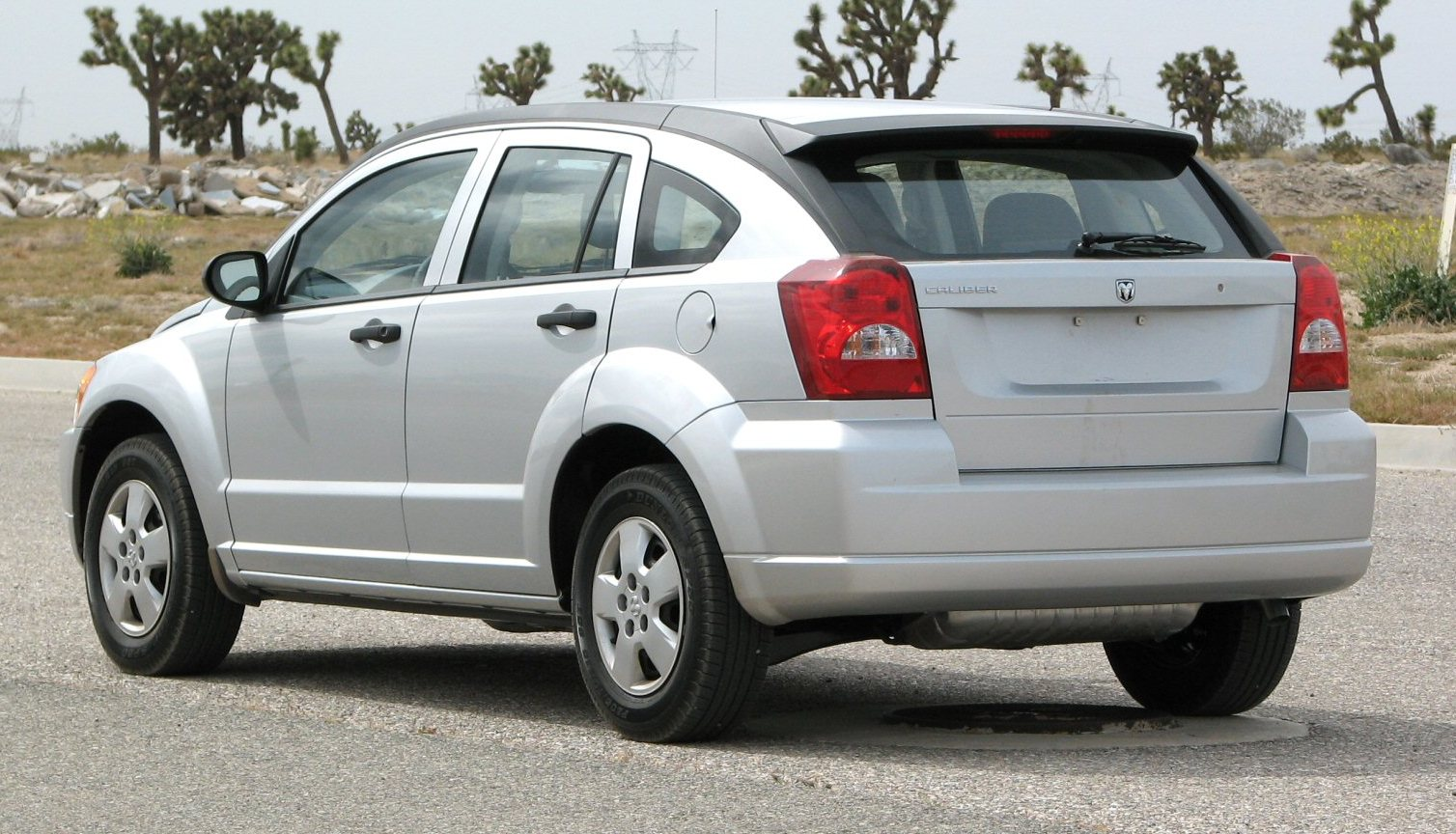
2007 Dodge Caliber

The base SE model features front-wheel drive and a 1.8 L 148 hp (110 kW) World I4 with a Magna Drivetrain T355 five-speed manual transmission. A 2.0 L 158 hp (118 kW) engine with the CVT2 transmission was optional.

The standard configuration for the SE did not include air conditioning, power windows, door locks, or mirrors. The SE did not have a tachometer or assist handles. The standard wheels were 15 in (38 cm) steel with wheel covers. The grille surround is body-colored, while that of all other models is chromed. However, Canadian SXT and R/T models feature body-color grilles instead of chrome grilles. Some options were not available on the SE.

For 2011, this model was named Express, reverting to SE for 2012. For 2012, the CVT transmission option was dropped only for the SE, leaving the five-speed manual transmission as the only available transmission for the SE. The CVT continued to be offered in the SXT and SXT Plus models for 2012.

==== SXT ====
The SXT has the same engine choices as the SE, but many more features were standard. Air conditioning is standard equipment at this level, including the Chill Zone beverage cooler inside the front lower glove compartment. The gauge cluster gains a tachometer and an (optional) trip computer. The driver's seat adds height adjustment, the passenger seat folds flat for load-carrying, and the rear seats recline. Power windows, locks, mirrors, and remote keyless entry are included. The grille is chromed, and 17 in (43 cm) steel wheels are standard, with 17 in (43 cm) aluminum wheels as an option. The cargo area light includes a removable and rechargeable flashlight, while the front dome light incorporates two reading lamps.

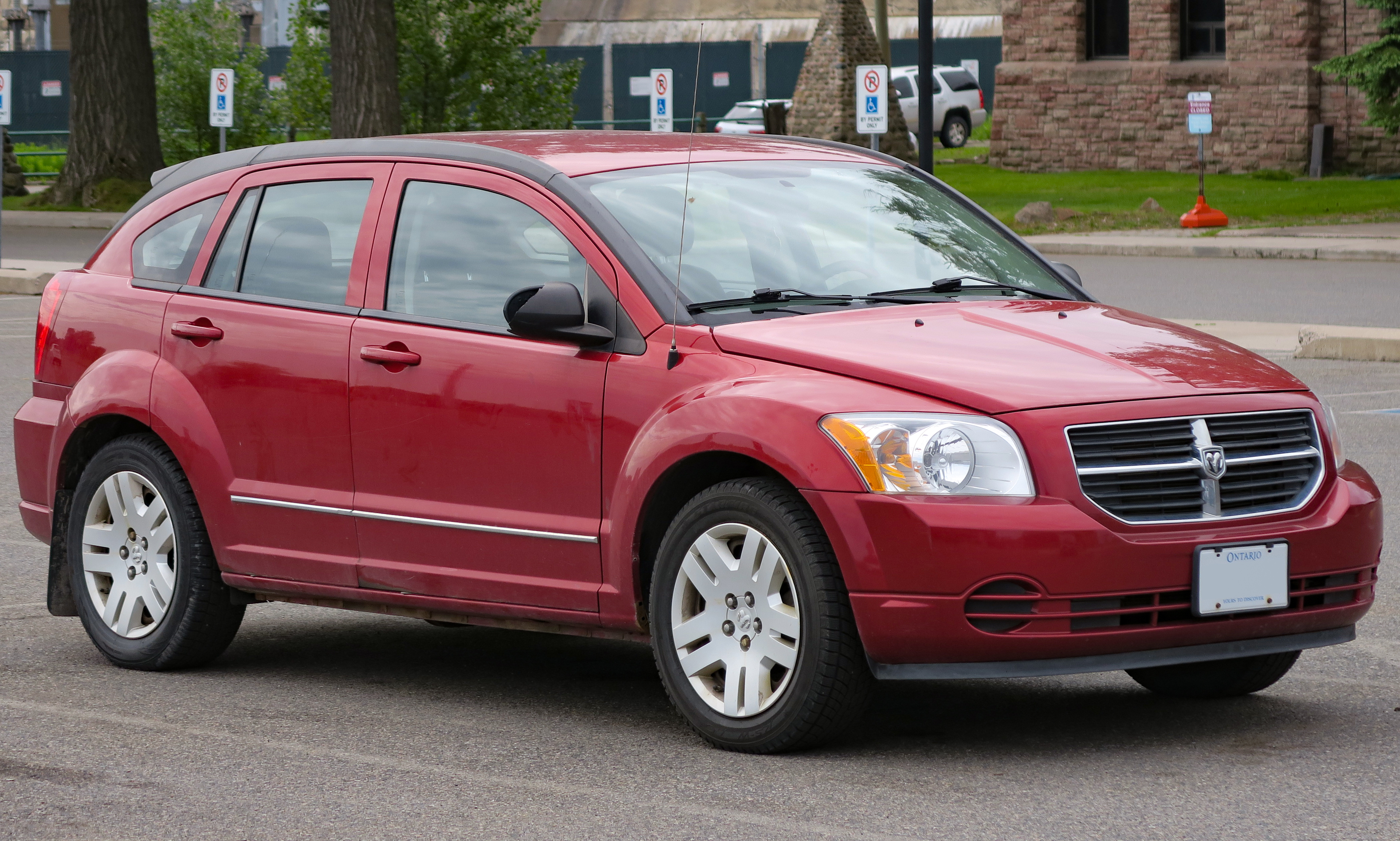
2010 Dodge Caliber SXT

This version was marketed in Europe and equipped with a VW-built 2.0 L turbodiesel engine.

Some Dodge publications mention a SXT Sport Wagon model, while others (such as the Dodge official website) listed an SXT "E" package with identical features. The E package consisted of 17 in (43 cm) aluminum wheels, color-keyed cloth seat inserts, color-matched instrument panel trim, and fog lamps.

The UK SXT Sport model has 18 in (46 cm) alloy wheels, color-keyed cloth seats and instrument panel, and a 9-speaker audio system as standard; early UK models did not have the chrome grille. The UK SXT Sport was available with a Volkswagen 2.0 L diesel engine mated to a six-speed manual transmission.

For 2011, the Heat, Uptown, and Mainstreet were three available trim levels of the Caliber, reverting to SXT and SXT Plus in 2012.

==== R/T ====
The R/T model has a 2.4 L 172 hp (128 kW) version of the World engine, equipped with the CVT2 transmission, and programmed with an 'AutoStick' feature giving six simulated fixed ratios in a clutchless manual mode in addition to the standard CVT 'Drive' mode. All-wheel-drive was an option on the R/T model until 2009, but with automatic transmission only. Eighteen-inch aluminum wheels were standard, while chromed versions were optional. At launch, the CVT2 with all-wheel drive was the only powertrain combination available for the R/T. A front-wheel-drive variant with the T355 5-speed manual transmission commenced production in late summer 2006. ABS was standard, and the suspension and steering systems were tuned for performance.

Externally, the R/T is distinguishable by body-color/chrome door handles (replacing black on other models), chrome side molding, chromed exhaust tip, front fog lights, and R/T badging.

Internally, the car came standard with color-keyed fabric seat inserts, while leather seats were an option as on the SXT. Color-keyed instrument panel trim was also standard, as well as a leather-wrapped steering wheel with audio controls and speed control, and a cargo area cover (all options on the SXT).

The R/T model was discontinued in 2010.

==== SRT4 ====
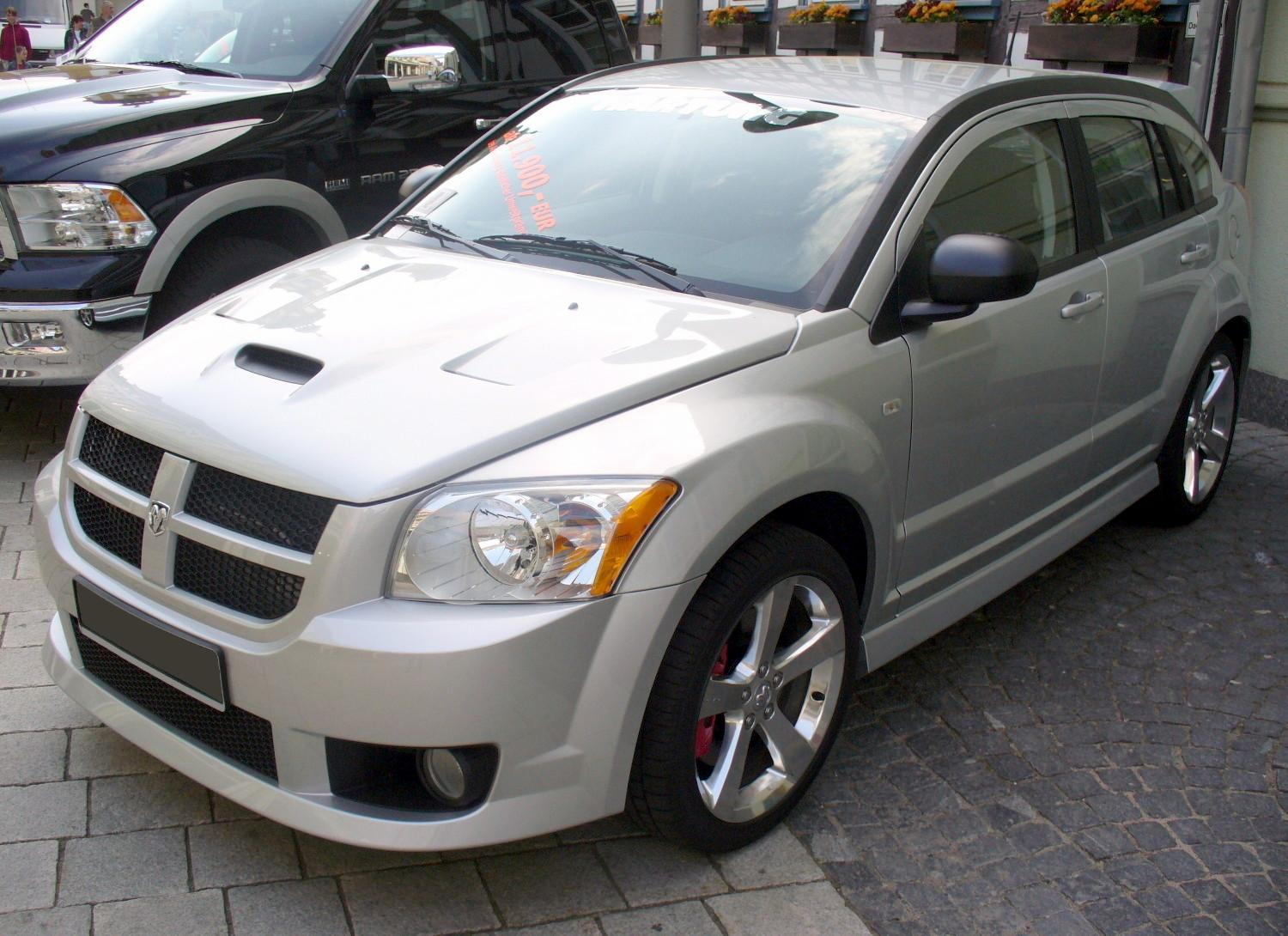
Dodge Caliber SRT4

The SRT4, introduced at the Chicago Auto Show in February 2006, replaced the Neon-based SRT-4 produced by Chrysler's Street and Racing Technology group.

The SRT4 competed with the Volkswagen GTI and the Mazdaspeed3. It featured a 2.4 L DOHC 16V turbocharged I4 with dual variable valve timing (DVVT) producing 285 hp (213 kW) at 6,400 rpm, and 265 lb⋅ft (359 N⋅m) of torque at 5,600 rpm, using the TD04HL4S-20 turbo. Edmunds.com tested a Caliber SRT4 on a chassis dynamometer and obtained 281 hp (210 kW) and 261 lb⋅ft (354 N⋅m) of torque at the wheels. They called the manufacturer's rating conservative; putting more power on the road than cars costing twice as much. This engine is mated to a Getrag six-speed manual transmission and uses a front-wheel drive drivetrain. The Caliber SRT4 uses a MacPherson strut front suspension and a multilink rear suspension. The SRT4 came with 13.4 in (34 cm) vented front disc brakes (from the Dodge Charger Police Pack version) with dual-piston calipers and 11.9 in (30 cm) rear single-piston disc brakes. It also featured four-wheel ABS, with electronic assistance. The wheels are 19 in (48 cm), five-spoke, SRT-stamped, painted aluminum, and equipped with Goodyear RSA 225/45R19 tires. Package options included polished aluminum wheels, Goodyear Eagle F1 Supercar tires, SIRIUS satellite radio with Kicker SRT livin' loud audio, EVIC with performance pages, security alarm, and optional paint colors.

The SRT4 model of the Caliber was available through 2009.

=== Engines ===
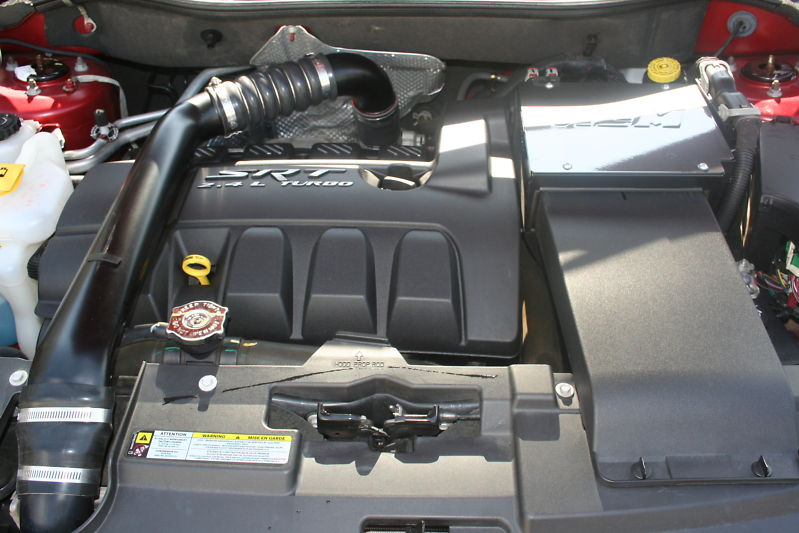
Turbocharged 2.4 L I4 World Engine (285 hp) Dodge Caliber SRT4

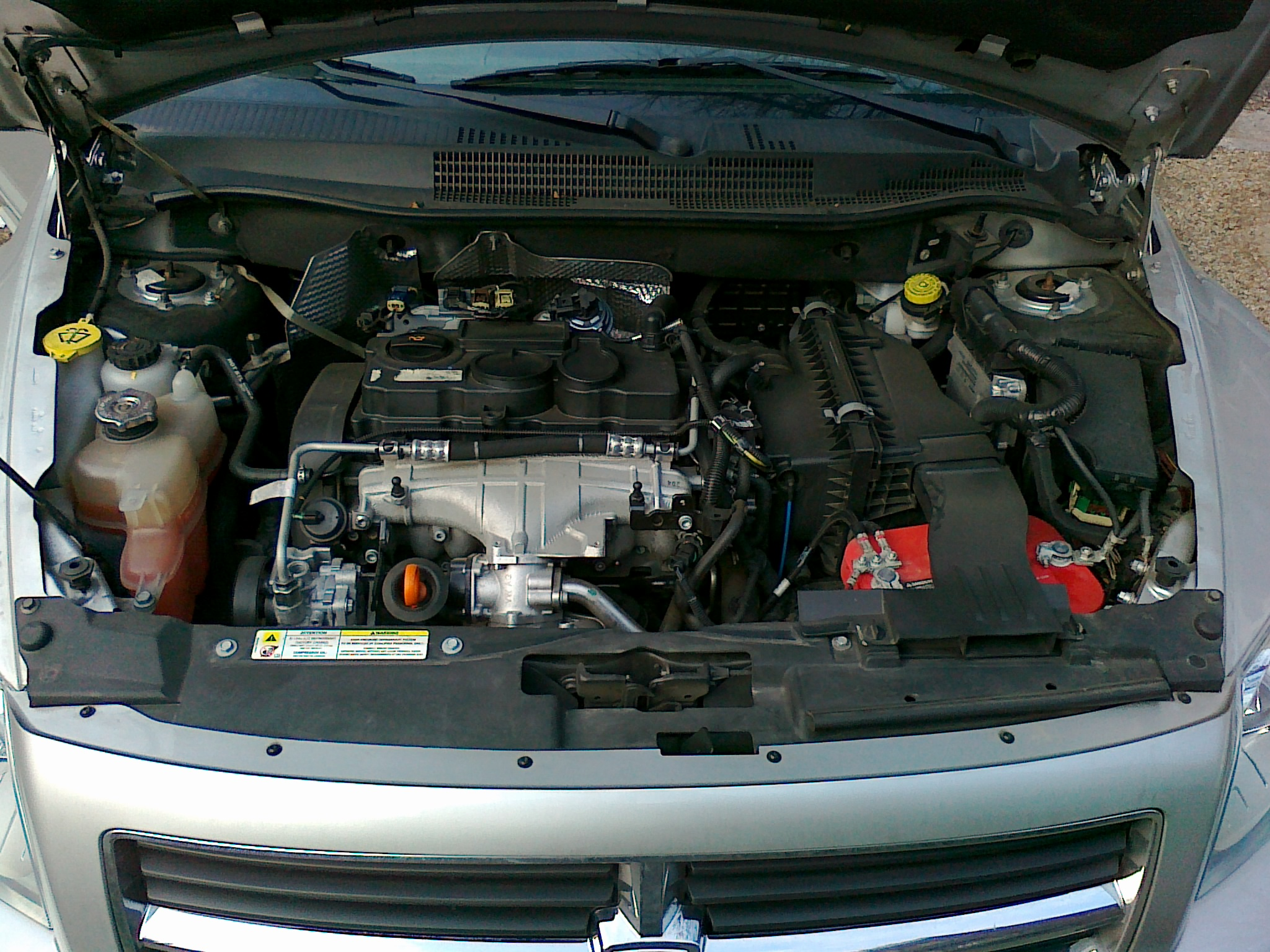
The VW-built TDI Pumpe-Düse (pump-nozzle) diesel engine available Dodge Caliber diesel variant sold in Europe (MY2007)

Model	Year	Engine type	Power	Torque	Notes
SE, SXT	2007–2009	1.8 L World I4	148 bhp (110 kW)	125 lb⋅ft (169 N⋅m)	5-speed manual, FWD
SE, SXT	2007–2011	2.0L World I4	158 bhp (118 kW)	141 lb⋅ft (191 N⋅m)	CVT2 (2007–present), 5-speed manual (2010–2012), FWD
Diesel	2006–2007	2.0 L I4 turbo (from Volkswagen 140hp TDI BKD)	138 bhp (103 kW)	229 lb⋅ft (310 N⋅m)	Europe & Australia only, FWD (without DPF)
Diesel	2008–2011	2.0 L I4 turbo (from Volkswagen 170hp TDI BMR)	168 bhp (125 kW)	229 lb⋅ft (310 N⋅m)	Europe & Australia only, FWD (with DPF)
R/T	2007–2011	2.4 L World I4	172 bhp (128 kW)	165 lb⋅ft (224 N⋅m)	AWD: CVT2 (2007–2008), FWD: CVT2/5-speed manual (2007–2011)
SRT4	2008–2009	2.4 L World I4 turbo ("Warhawk")	285 bhp (213 kW)	265 lb⋅ft (359 N⋅m)	6-speed Getrag manual, FWD

== Updates ==
=== 2009 ===
For the 2009 model, the Caliber underwent a minor revamp. The plain plastic black-colored door handles available on base models were replaced by painted car-colored handles previously available only on R/T. In addition, the trunk lid was reduced in weight and simplified in its opening. In the interior, all panels were made black instead of grey. The "DODGE" badge that was on top of the Ram logo in the middle was shifted to the left, while the "CALIBER" badge was moved to the right from the left, both equal in font size. The car model title, previously indicated on the right, was moved to the bottom right corner of the gate lid.

=== 2010 ===
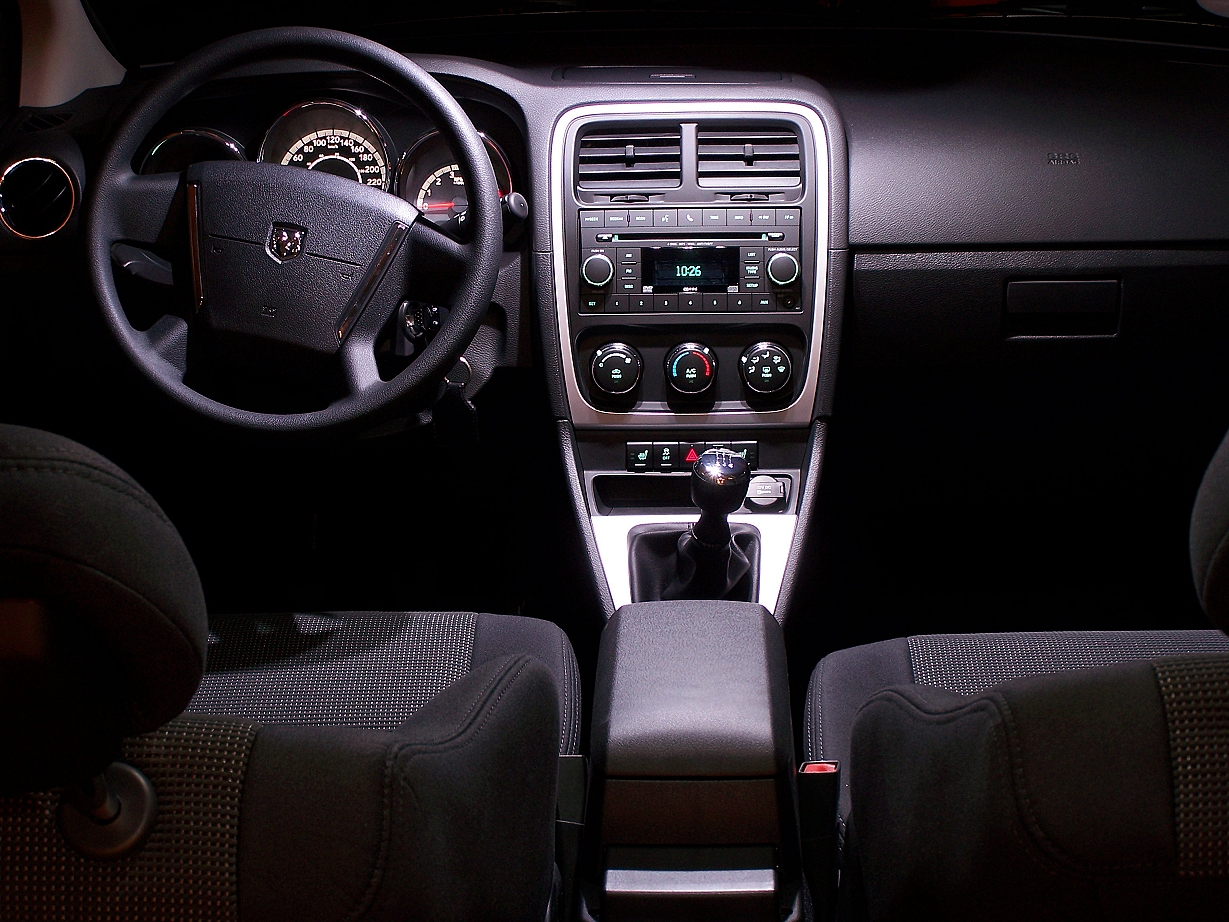
2010 Dodge Caliber interior

The 2010 model year was unveiled at the 2009 Frankfurt Motor Show, featuring a refreshed interior design composed of metallic outlines and parts of glass to suppress the abundance of plastic materials on previous models, as well as the addition of an 8-way power driver's seat, heated mirrors, and an automatic climate control system previously available only on R/T. The dashboard also features the relocation of the glove box due to many customer complaints, which now occupies the spot over the radio panel and comprises a "push-open" lock instead of the previous "squeeze-and-lift" opening mechanism.

The 1.8 L engine was dropped from the SE and SXT models, and the SRT4 model is discontinued. European market models receive a new 2.2 L diesel engine with 163 hp (122 kW) and 236 lb⋅ft (320 N⋅m) of torque that provides a combined city and highway fuel efficiency of 40.6 miles per US gallon (5.79 L/100 km; 48.8 mpg_{‑imp}).

For the United States market, the models were promptly renamed and rebranded, with SE becoming "Main Street", SXT — "Heat" and R/T — "Rush". Two more models were launched in 2010: a luxury all-included variant "Uptown" and a base variant "Express" in which the black plastic handles returned. "Express" was the only model not to feature automatic climate control as an option, the "Main Street" featured speed control, an anti-lock brake system, and electronic stability control, which were previously unavailable as options for SE. All models except "Express" featured 17-inch wheels.

=== 2011 ===
The 2011 model brought six new paint schemes, standard stability control except on Express models, Sirius traffic when equipped with a navigation system, 18-inch chrome-clad wheels available on Uptown models (17" painted are standard), updated steering except on Express models, and new shocks and a thicker rear anti-roll bar on Rush and Heat models. The Caliber and the Nitro were the only two cars in the Dodge vehicle lineup to still feature the Ram logo on both fascia, rear, and the steering wheel. The Dodge Nitro also featured driver and passenger floor mats. The logo was removed from the mats in Calibers with the 2009 model.

=== 2012 ===
For the 2012 model year, the models were renamed back to SE, SXT, and SXT Plus. The Plus version includes all the SXT items and 18-inch aluminum wheels with performance tires, as well as a 6-way power-adjustable driver seat. The SXT Plus was not sold in Canada.

== Safety ==
The Insurance Institute for Highway Safety (IIHS) gave the Caliber an overall Good score in frontal crash testing. The Dodge Caliber was standard with side curtain airbags, but torso side airbags were optional. The IIHS had scored the Caliber Marginal overall in their side impact test. However, the Caliber tested was not equipped with the optional torso-side airbag.

IIHS:
Moderate overlap front	Good
Side	Marginal
Roof strength	Acceptable
Head restraints & seats	Good

NHTSA 2011 Dodge Caliber :
Overall:	3/5 stars
Frontal Driver Side:	4/5 stars
Frontal Passenger Side:	4/5 stars
Front Seat:	2/5 stars
Rear Seat:	5/5 stars
Driver:	3/5 stars
Rear Passenger:	5/5 stars
Rollover Star Rating:	/ 15.50%

ANCAP test results* Dodge Caliber variant(s) as tested (2007)
Test	Score
Overall	5 /5 stars
Frontal offset	11.14/16
Side impact	16/16
Pole	2/2
Seat belt reminders	0/3
Whiplash protection	Not Assessed
Pedestrian protection	Poor
Electronic stability control	Optional

== Discontinuation ==
The 2010 Caliber was the last model sold in Europe. The 2011 model ended production on 23 November 2011, in the United States, with the remainder being sold as the 2012 model year Caliber in both the U.S. and Canada. A successor called the Dart, based on the Alfa Romeo Giulietta's platform, went on sale in June 2012 for the 2013 model-year as the compact vehicle in Dodge's lineup.

== Sales ==
Calendar year	U.S.	Canada	Europe	Australia	Total
2006	92,224	19,524	10,657		122,405
2007	101,079	18,553	16,956		136,588
2008	84,158	19,544	11,056		114,758
2009	36,098	9,802	6,055		51,955
2010	45,082	7,275	3,444		55,801
2011	35,049	4,919	835	1,257	42,060
2012	10,176	282	24	410	10,892
2013	45	7	1		53
2014			1		1
