= Jeep Patriot =

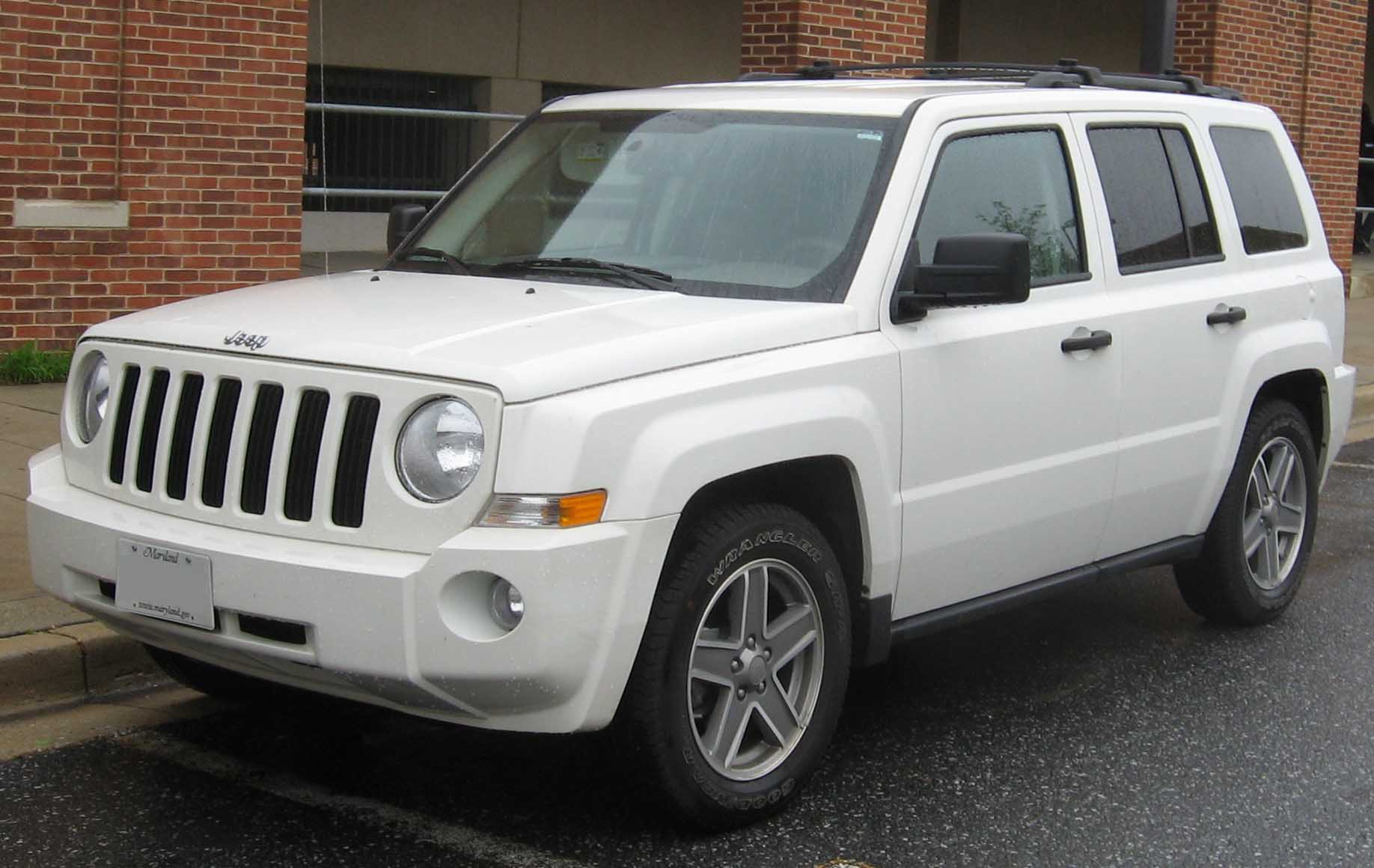

Overview
- Manufacturer: Jeep (Note: DaimlerChrysler (2006–2007); Chrysler LLC (2007–2009); Chrysler Group LLC (2009–2014); FCA US LLC (2014–2017))
- Also called: Jeep Liberty (Russia and Commonwealth of Independent States)
- Production: 2006–2016
- Model years: 2007–2017
- Assembly: United States: Belvidere, Illinois (Belvidere Assembly Plant)

Body and chassis
- Class: Compact crossover SUV
- Body style: 5-door SUV
- Layout: Front-engine, front-wheel drive / all-wheel drive
- Platform: Chrysler PM/MK platform
- Related: Jeep Compass; Dodge Caliber; Mitsubishi ASX

Powertrain
- Engine: 2.0 L GEMA World I4 (gasoline); 2.0 L VW EA188 CRD PD I4 (turbo-diesel); 2.2 L Mercedes-Benz OM651 CRD I4 (t/c diesel); 2.4 L GEMA World I4 (gasoline)
- Transmission: 5-speed Magna T355 manual; 6-speed Aisin BG6 manual (Diesel only); 6-speed Hyundai 6F24 automatic; CVT Jatco JF011E automatic

Dimensions
- Wheelbase: 103.7 in (2,635 mm)
- Length: 173.6 in (4,409 mm)
- Width: 69.1 in (1,755 mm)
- Height: 2007–09: 64.4 in (1,636 mm); 2010–2017: 65.7 in (1,669 mm)

Chronology
- Successor: Jeep Compass (MP)

The Jeep Patriot (MK74) is a front-engine five-door compact crossover SUV manufactured and marketed by Jeep, having debuted with the Jeep Compass in April 2006 at the New York Auto Show for the 2007 model year. Both cars, as well as the Dodge Caliber, shared the GS platform, differentiated by their styling and marketing, with the Patriot exclusively offering a four-wheel drive system, marketed as Freedom Drive II.

The Patriot was manufactured at Chrysler's Belvidere, Illinois assembly plant alongside the Compass. Although the model was still selling well even as it was essentially unchanged as it entered its 11th model year, production ended with the 2017 model year.

In Russia and the Commonwealth of Independent States, it was called Jeep Liberty, despite not being related, due to the Patriot name being owned by UAZ in the former Soviet Union.

== Design ==
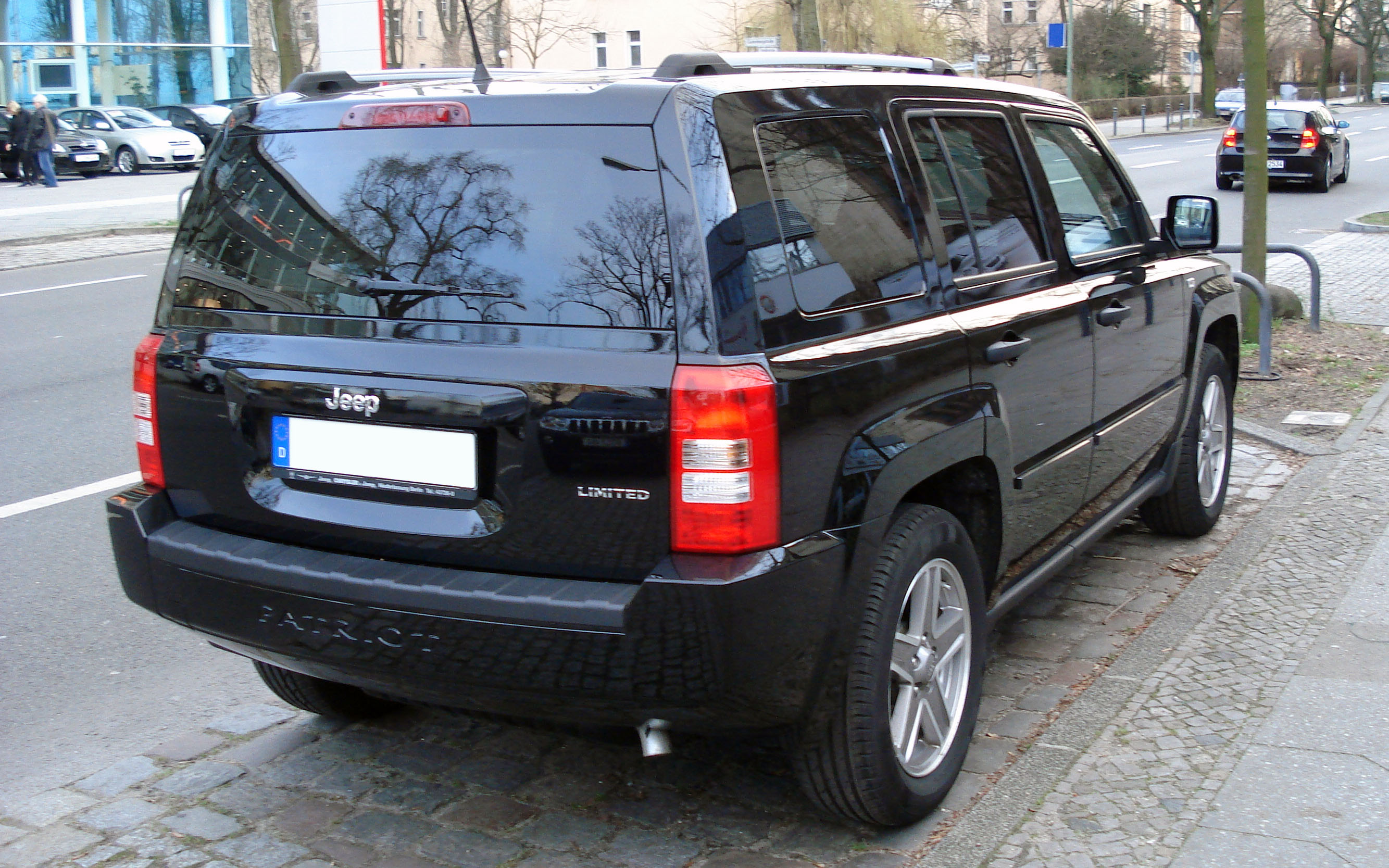
Pre-facelift Jeep Patriot Limited (Europe)

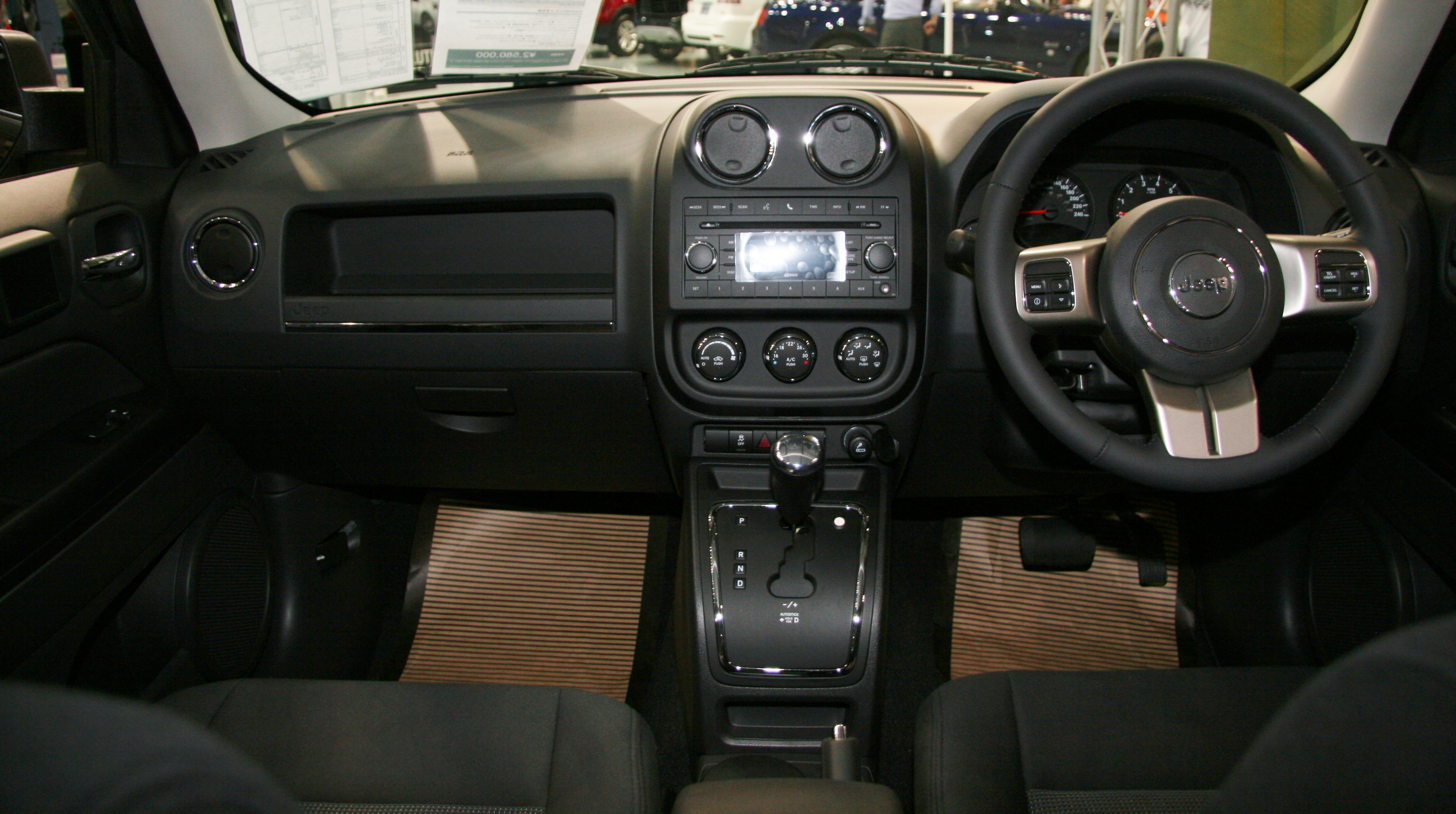
Interior

In the U.S. the Patriot uses either the 2.0 L or 2.4 L World gasoline I4 engine. Both front-wheel drive and four-wheel drive are available. The Patriot features two four-wheel drive systems both of which are electronically controlled.

The standard four-wheel drive system is called Freedom Drive I. This is a full-time Automatic 4WD that directly drives the front differential carrier from the transmission output and is exclusively front-wheel drive whenever 4WD is not commanded by the powertrain control module or the driver. The transaxle supplies power to the rear drive unit via a driveshaft that is in constant mesh with the front carrier. The driveshaft joins the front transaxle through a small, fixed-ratio gearbox, which Jeep refers to as the Power Transfer Unit. The driveshaft is suspended by a centrally mounted carrier bearing and delivers torque to an assembly at the rear of the vehicle, which Jeep refers to as the Rear Drive Unit. An electronically controlled multi-plate wet clutch located inside the rear drive unit variably couples this driveshaft with a pinion gear that drives an open differential carrier and delivers power to the rear wheels. The clutch coupling force is sufficient to supply up to 100% of available engine torque to the rear axle. A driver accessible control located between the front seats allows the driver to command a locked 4WD mode that simulates the behavior of a fixed center coupling on a conventional 4WD vehicle. In both the default operating mode and the driver-selected 4WD mode, the operation of this clutch is computer-controlled, and it will disconnect and revert to automatic operation above 35 miles per hour. To prevent static driveline windup the powertrain controller will vary the force of clutch engagement while the vehicle is traveling on a curved path, using input from a steering angle sensor.

An optional four-wheel drive system called Freedom Drive II is based on Freedom Drive I and operates similarly, however in combination with a unique CVT transmission it is capable of a 19:1 gear reduction simulating a low range usually found in vehicles with dedicated transfer cases. This 19:1 "crawl" ratio is achieved with a much lower (numerically higher) ring and pinion ratio compared to non-Freedom Drive II vehicles and permits the driver to optionally hold this initial ratio for enhanced control at very low speeds.

Freedom Drive II is part of an equipment package including several other enhancements intended for use on more difficult terrain, and Jeep Patriots with this package bear Jeep's "Trail Rated" badging.

All Jeep Patriots include an enhanced traction control system that operates on both driven axles (4WD models) or on the front axle only (2WD models) to supply torque to all four wheels effectively and without a locking or limited slip differential. This system is branded BLD by Jeep and operates by applying braking force to a wheel on either (driven) axle if that wheel is measured spinning faster than the other wheel on the same axle. BLD remains in effect even if the driver selects the traction control off option.

The 2.4 L GEMA I4 is an option for the 4X2 model Patriot.

For Europe and Australia, a 2.0 L (1968 cc; 120 cid; 140ps) Volkswagen-manufactured diesel engine is fitted along with a 6-speed manual gearbox. All EU cars are fitted as standard with four-wheel drive and a version of the Freedom Drive System that is tuned differently from the U.S. versions, but with similar capability to FDII, with brake traction control and three switchable electronic stability control and traction control settings for on or off-road use.

The Patriot won the 2007 Green 4x4 Award and the 2008 4x4 of the Year in the UK.

== Models ==
The Patriot was offered in three basic models with several additional options available:

Sport:

- Manual roll-up windows and manual door locks
- Vinyl-wrapped steering wheel and single low note horn
- Cruise control (not all years)
- Anti-theft ignition
- Vinyl (later cloth) seating surfaces
- Manually adjustable front bucket seats
- Folding rear bench seat
- 2.0 L I4 engine (4x2) or 2.4 L I4 engine (4x4) or 2.0 CRD (VW) 4x2, 4x4 or 2.1 CRD (Mercedes-Benz) 4x4
- 5-speed manual transmission (optional automatic available either 6-speed automatic or CVT, depending on year and engine)
- Tinted windows
- 16-inch all-season tires
- 16-inch styled steel wheels
- AM/FM stereo w/ single-disc CD player (later CD-MP3 player) and four speakers

Latitude:

- Power windows with one-touch driver's auto down feature and power door locks
- SIRIUS-XM satellite radio (optional accessory)
- Leather-wrapped steering wheel
- Keyless entry with panic feature and security system
- Cloth Seating Surfaces
- Air conditioning with manual controls
- 17-inch all-season tires
- 17-inch alloy wheels
- Rear dome light flashlight

Limited:

- Cloth (later leather) seating surfaces
- Power front driver's seat
- Power sunroof
- U Connect hands-free Bluetooth telephone system

High Altitude:

- All of the above including:
- Leather-trimmed seats
- Two-stage heated seats
- 6.5-inch touchscreen with U-Connect
- Subwoofer

== Electric version ==
At the 2009 North American International Auto Show in Detroit, the Jeep Patriot was added to Chrysler's ENVI lineup. As with the previously announced Jeep Wrangler EV, the Jeep Patriot EV is an extended-range electric vehicle (EREV, also called a plug-in hybrid vehicle), capable of traveling 40 mi (64 km) solely on battery power and up to 400 mi (644 km) on a single tank of gas.

However, Chrysler's new partner Fiat SpA disbanded the ENVI division in November 2009, and removed the three ENVI models from its 5-year plan for Chrysler. There have been no announced plans to continue with the electric version.

== 2011 facelift ==
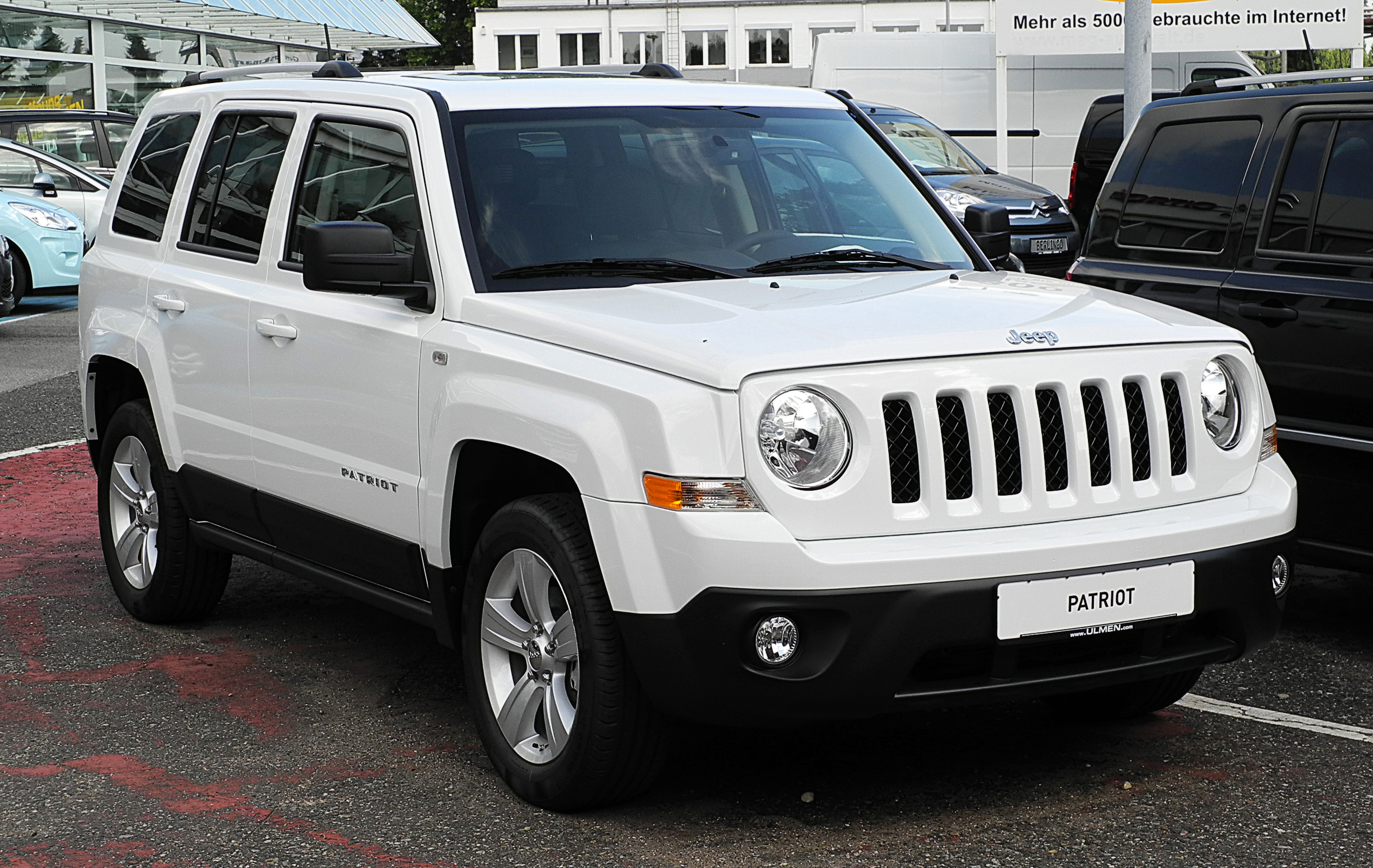
2011 facelift

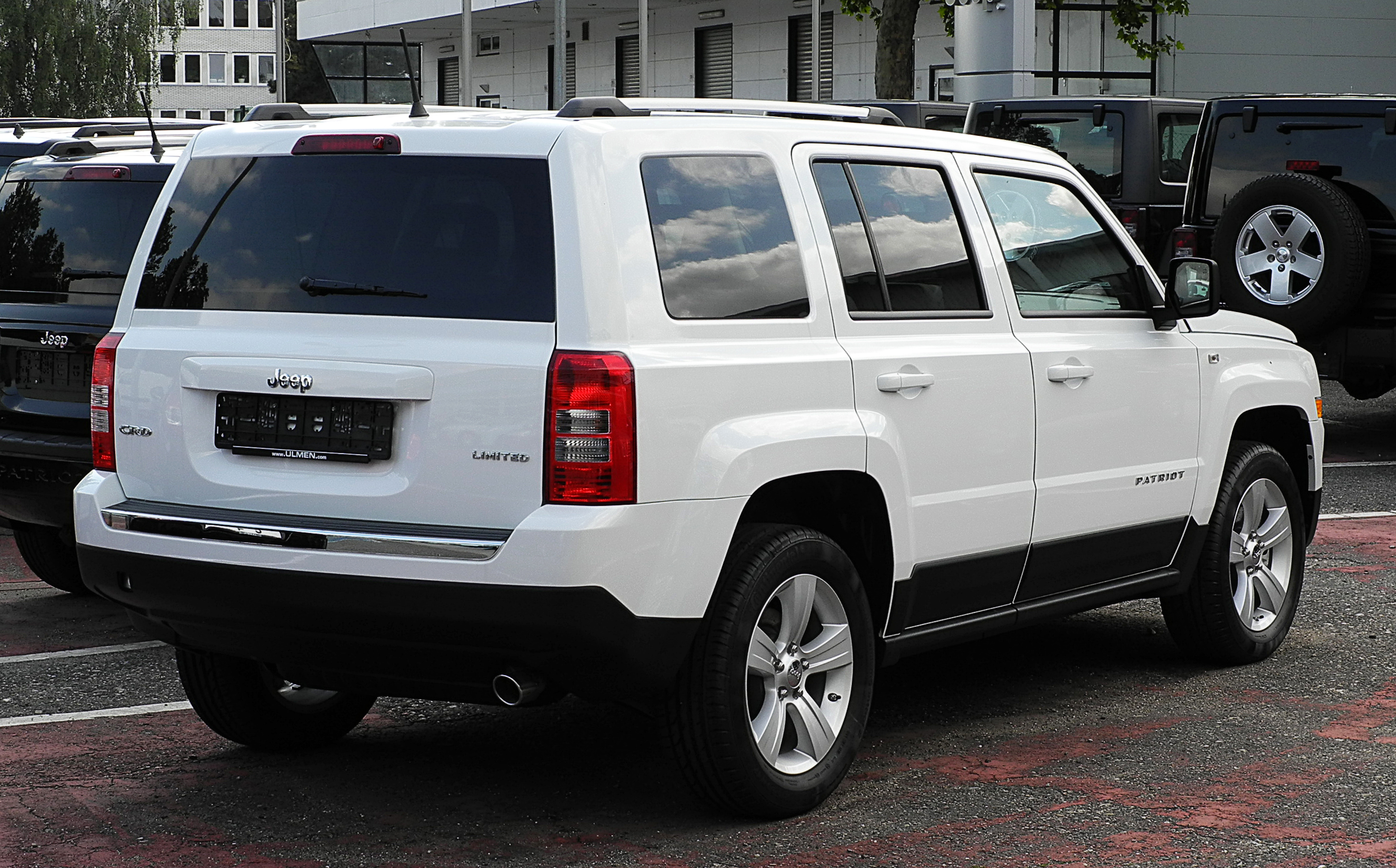
2011 facelift

The Patriot received minor interior and exterior upgrades for 2011. The front fog lamps were shrunken and relocated, grille redesigned, and the "Patriot" lettering on the rear bumper was removed and replaced with a more traditional rear bumper. Three trims were offered in the US: Sport, Latitude, and Limited (which replaced the earlier Latitude X). In Canada, North Edition replaced the Latitude trim with slightly different equipment.

In the EU, four trims were offered: Sport, Sport Plus, Limited, and an Overland version. In the EU market, the 2.0 L Volkswagen PD Diesel Engine was replaced by a 2.2 L Mercedes-Benz Twin-Cam Common Rail Diesel engine delivering 163 hp (122 kW).

For 2011, a 70th Anniversary Edition model was offered to commemorate the Jeep's history. It was based on the Sport model with special olive or beige interior colors, unique alloy wheels, a nine-speaker Boston Acoustics premium sound system with subwoofer and fold-down liftgate speakers, Sirius XM Radio, a leather-wrapped steering wheel, leather seats, heated front seats, and other features. This model was available from May to October 2011.

For 2012 only, an Altitude Edition model, based on the Sport model, was offered. It featured black leather upholstery, special black-finished alloy wheels, a nine-speaker sound system, Sirius XM Radio, a leather-wrapped steering wheel, heated front seats, and black-painted exterior accents. This model started production in May 2012 and was only available for a few months.

For the 2013 model year, a Freedom Edition model, based on the Sport model, was offered to commemorate Jeep's commitment to the U.S. Army and military, as well as to commemorate all of the soldiers who have served. It has a special star hood decal, power leather seats, a leather-wrapped steering wheel, Sirius XM Radio, and dark-finished alloy wheels. This model features Commando Green Metallic exterior paint that is not available on other 2013 Jeep Patriots.

The Jeep Patriot underwent many changes in trims or models for the 2014 model year; however, 2014 was the first model year that Freedom Drive 1 Patriots came with a Hyundai 6-speed automatic transmission instead of the CVT.

== Discontinuation ==
2017 was the last year for the Patriot, but production was discontinued in December 2016 (with the remainder of the fleet marketed as "2017" and sold until stock depletion). Both Patriot and first-generation Jeep Compass were replaced by second-generation Compass.

== Safety ==
=== ANCAP ===
ANCAP test results Jeep Patriot 4x2 variants only (2011)
| Test | Score |
|---|---|
| Overall | 5 /5 stars |
| Frontal offset | 13.79/16 |
| Side impact | 15.94/16 |
| Pole | 2/2 |
| Seat belt reminders | 1/3 |
| Whiplash protection | Good |
| Pedestrian protection | Not Assessed |
| Electronic stability control | Standard |

=== Insurance Institute for Highway Safety (IIHS) ===
IIHS scores
| Moderate overlap frontal offset | Good |
| Small overlap frontal offset | Poor |
| Side impact | Good* |
| Roof strength | Good |

*2007–2013 models with additional optional side airbags. Models without additional optional side airbags were rated Marginal.

=== NHTSA ===
2007-2010 Patriot NHTSA scores
| Frontal Driver: | 4/5 stars |
| Frontal Passenger: | 5/5 stars |
| Side Driver: | 5/5 stars |
| Side Passenger: | 5/5 stars |
| 4x2 Rollover: | 4/5 stars |
| 4x4 Rollover: | 4/5 stars |

2013 Patriot NHTSA scores
| Overall: | 4/5 stars |
| Frontal Driver: | 3/5 stars |
| Frontal Passenger: | 4/5 stars |
| Side Driver: | 5/5 stars |
| Side Passenger: | 5/5 stars |
| Side Pole Driver: | 3/5 stars |
| Rollover: | 3/5 stars |

== Global sales ==
| Calendar year | USA | Canada | Other | Mexico | Europe |
|---|---|---|---|---|---|
| 2007 | 40,434 | 9,629 | | 13,612 | 40,434 |
| 2008 | 55,654 | 13,836 | | 9,823 | 55,654 |
| 2009 | 31,432 | 7,998 | | 8,543 | 31,432 |
| 2010 | 38,620 | 10,753 | | 6,441 | 38,620 |
| 2011 | 54,647 | 8,421 | | 7,702 | 54,647 |
| 2012 | 62,110 | 6,667 | | 8,297 | 62,010 |
| 2013 | 75,797 | 5,372 | 22,408 | 7,386 | 75,797 |
| 2014 | 93,462 | 5,959 | 22,966 | 6,926 | 93,462 |
| 2015 | 118,464 | 9,372 | 15,167 | 5,423 | 118,464 |
| 2016 | 121,926 | 9,026 | | 3,000 | 125,397 |
| 2017 | 40,495 | 3,009 | | 586 | 40,735 |
| 2018 | 621 | 3 | | 5 | 621 |
| 2019 | 27 | | | | 27 |
| 2020 | | | | | 3 |
| Subtotal | 733,682 | 90,045 | 197,051 | 77,744 | 737,303 |
| Total | 1,835,834 | | | | |
