= Chrysler 200 =

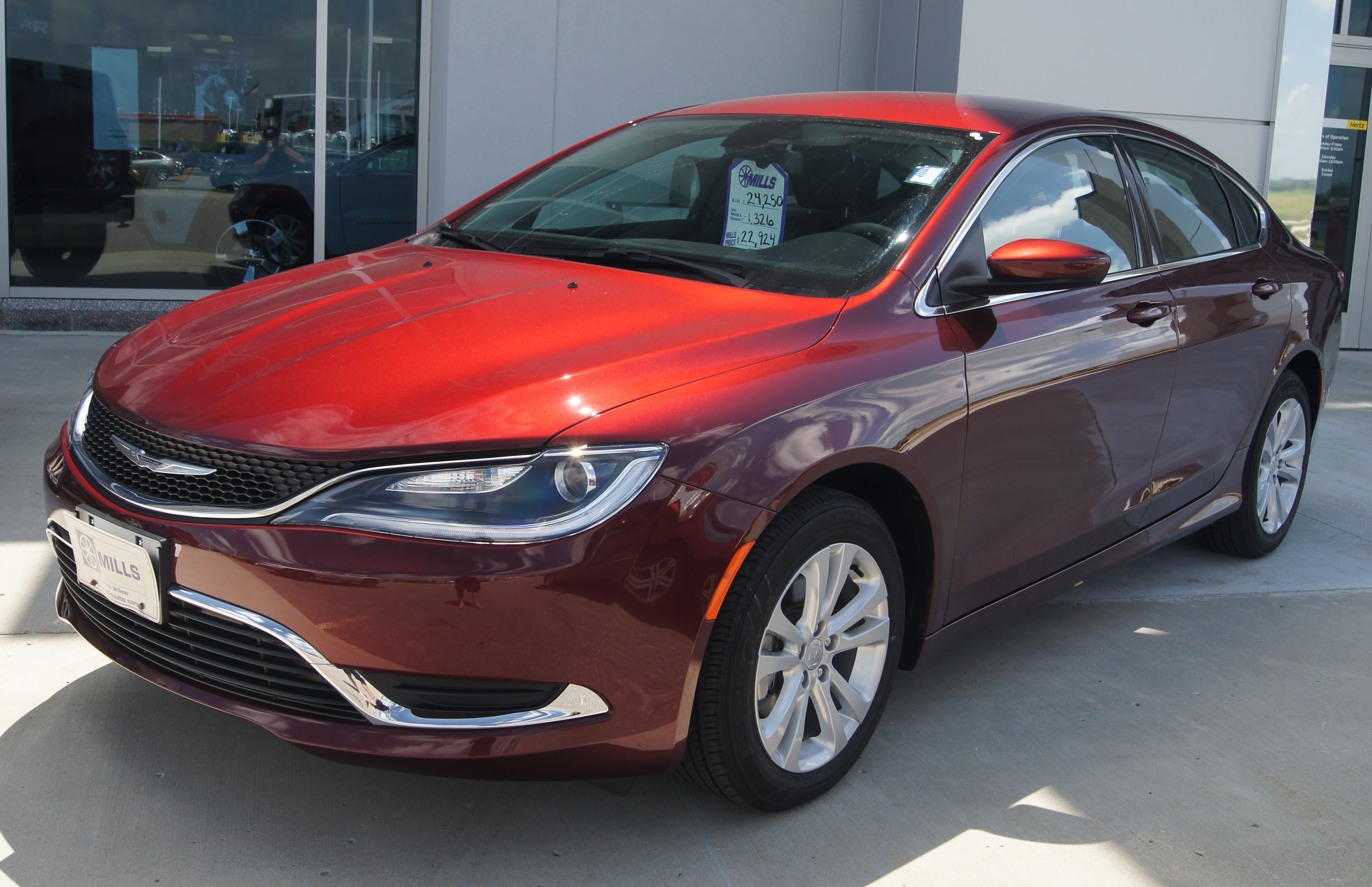

Overview
- Manufacturer: Chrysler (Note: Chrysler Group LLC (2011–2014) FCA US LLC (2014–2017))
- Production: 2010–2016
- Model years: 2011–2017
- Assembly: United States: Sterling Heights, Michigan

Body and chassis
- Class: Mid-size car

Chronology
- Predecessor: Chrysler Sebring
- Successor: None

The Chrysler 200 is a mid-size sedan that was manufactured and marketed by Chrysler from model years 2011 to 2017 across two generations in four-door sedan and two-door convertible (first generation only) body styles.

The 200 nameplate debuted on the 200C, a prototype hybrid vehicle shown at the 2009 North American International Auto Show in Detroit and based on the Chrysler 300. The 200C concept was engineered to accept either traditional gasoline, hybrid or full-electric powertrains.

== First generation (2011) ==
First generation
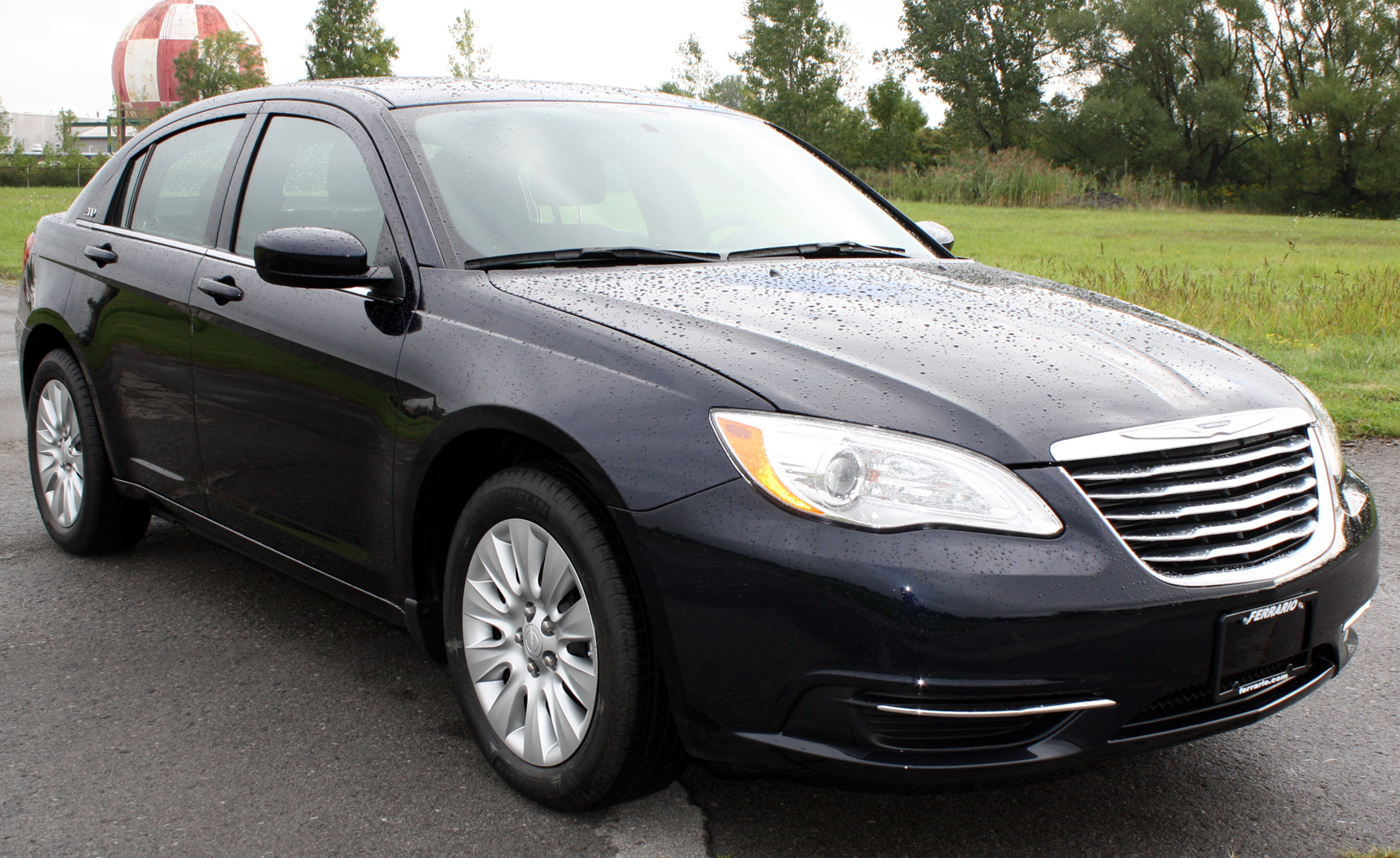

Overview
- Also called: Lancia Flavia (JS) - (Europe)
- Production: 2010–2014
- Model years: 2011–2014

Body and chassis
- Body style: 4-door sedan 2-door convertible
- Layout: Front-engine, front-wheel drive
- Platform: Chrysler JS platform
- Related: Chrysler Sebring; Dodge Avenger; Dodge Journey

Powertrain
- Engine: Gasoline: 2.4 L World I4; 3.6 L Pentastar V6
- Transmission: 4-speed Ultradrive 40TES automatic 6-speed Ultradrive 62TE automatic

Dimensions
- Wheelbase: 108.9 in (2,766 mm)
- Length: Sedan: 191.7 in (4,869 mm); Convertible: 194.8 in (4,948 mm)
- Width: 72.5 in (1,842 mm)
- Height: Sedan: 58.4 in (1,483 mm); Convertible: 57.9 in (1,471 mm)

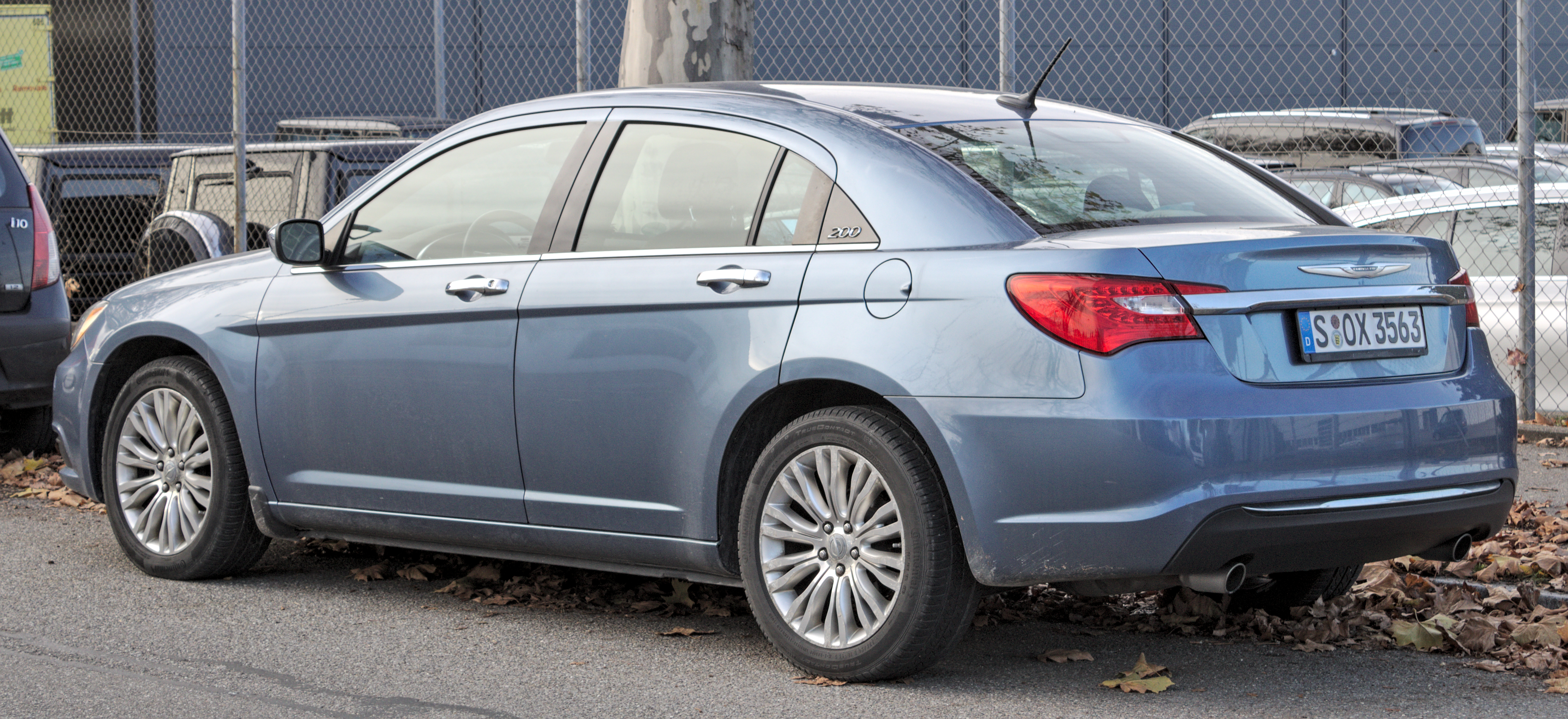
Rear view

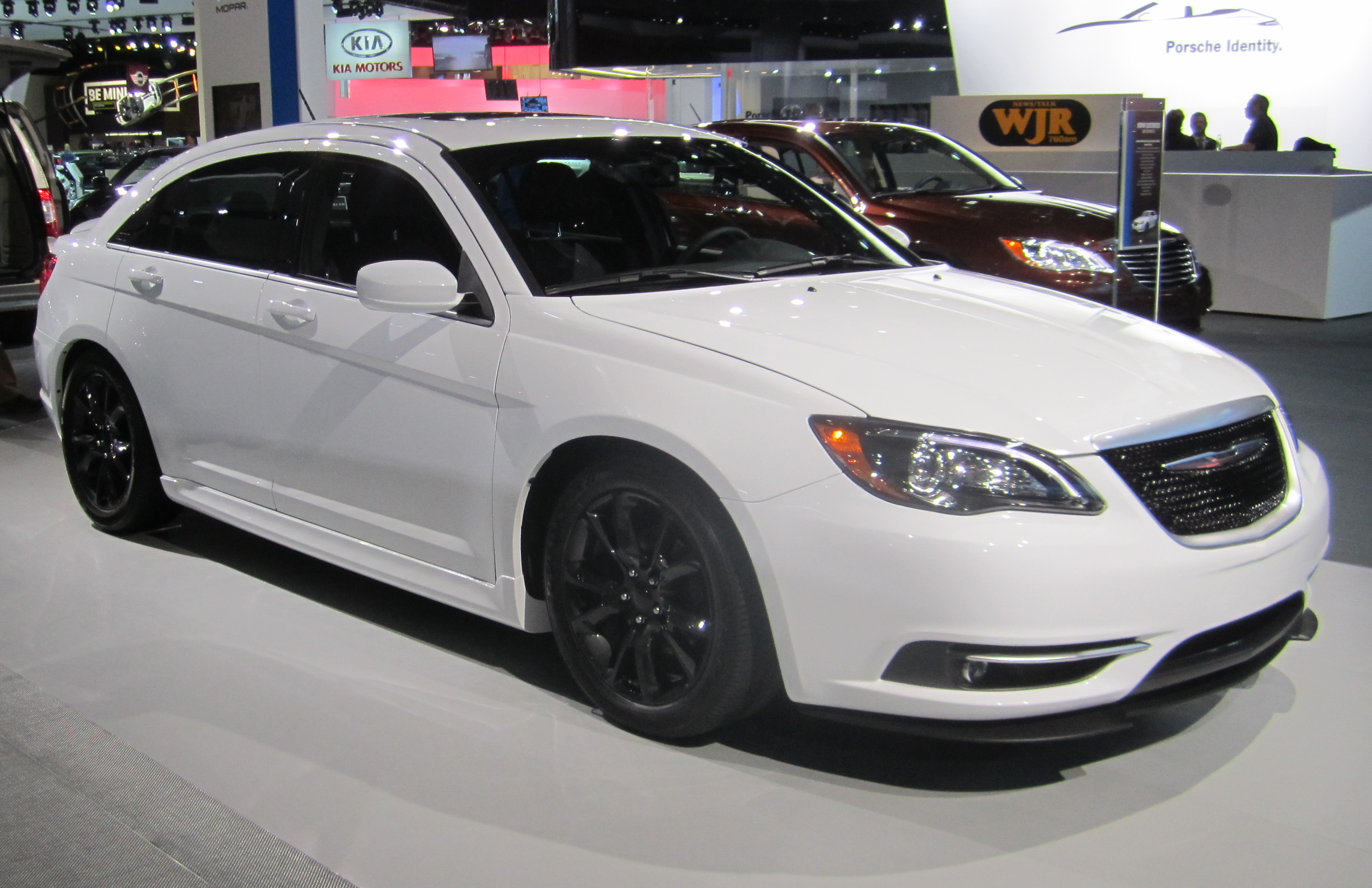
Chrysler 200 Super S at the 2012 North American International Auto Show

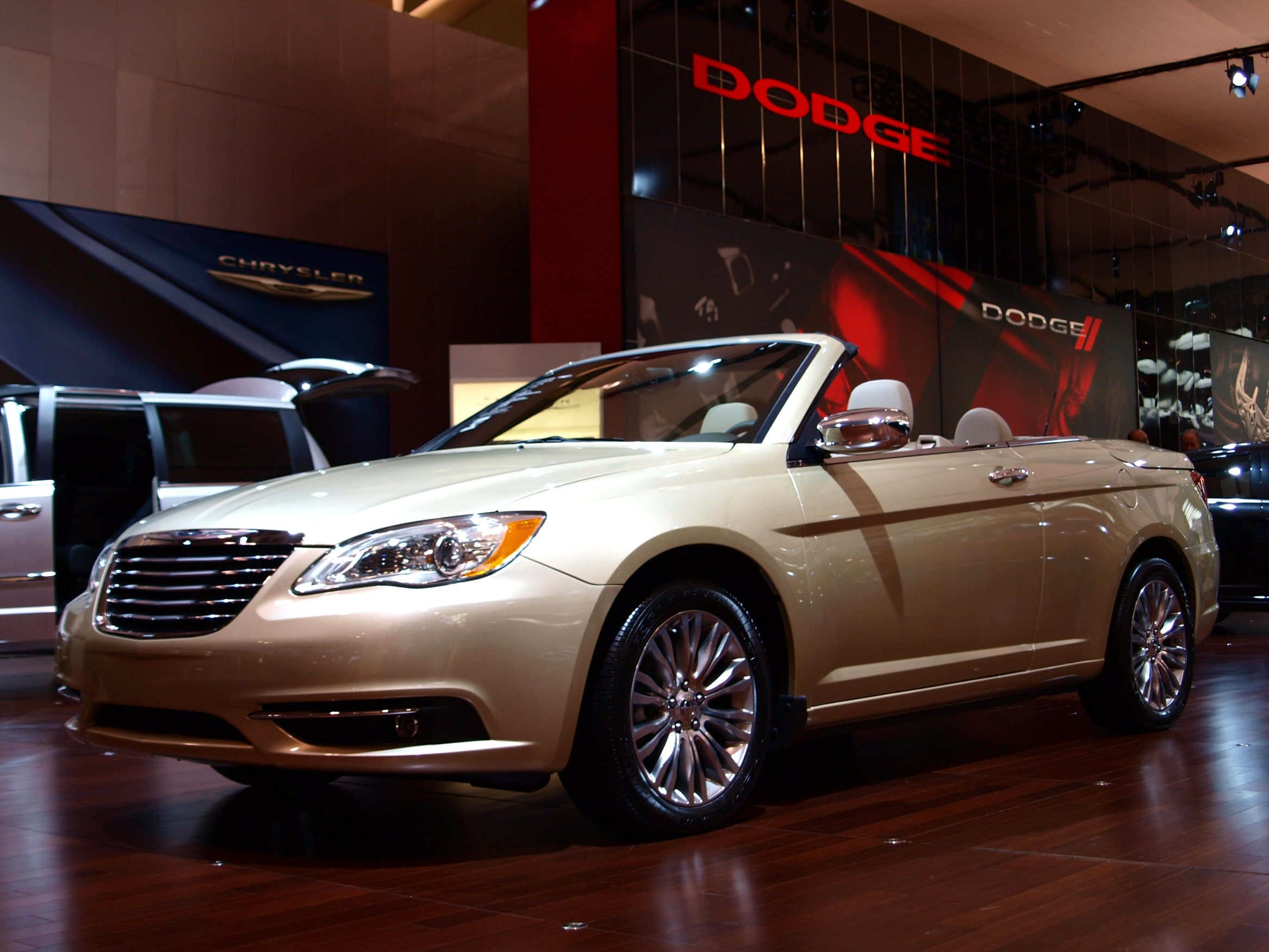
Chrysler 200 convertible

The first generation Chrysler 200 was a restyled, rebadged and re-engineered version of the third generation Chrysler Sebring that began production in 2006. Although the JS platform, of Mitsubishi origins, had been retained, there were many cosmetic and powertrain changes to the 200.

The 2.4 L four-cylinder 173 hp (129 kW) 166 lb⋅ft (225 N⋅m) engine with either a four-speed or six-speed automatic transmission carried over. Chrysler's new Pentastar 3.6 L V6 engine was also offered with a six-speed automatic transmission, generating 283 hp (211 kW) and 260 lb⋅ft (353 N⋅m) of torque. A flex-fuel version of the 3.6 L Pentastar engine was also available. Other changes included stiffer body mounts, revised suspension geometry with a softer ride rate, a new rear sway bar, and upgraded tires. The 200 was also more highly equipped than the Sebring. Chrysler added features such as LED lighting, thicker seat cushioning with higher quality materials, along with new measures to decrease noise, vibration, and harshness.

The Chrysler 200 was manufactured at Sterling Heights Assembly (Sterling Heights, Michigan) and arrived at dealers in December 2010. A 2-door convertible model was added in early 2011 with the same engine choices.

The 200 and its platform mate, the Dodge Avenger, were ranked the "Most American Made" sedans and convertibles by The Kogod Made in America Auto Index in 2013.

According to Edmunds' Acevedot, "by changing the name, Chrysler was able to let its midsize offering ride the coattails of the Chrysler 300 and to encourage consumers to think of the 200 as the younger brother of the flagship 300"; as an all-new generation of the 300 was released at the same time. Acevedot also noted that the name change has the added benefit of distancing itself from its predecessor, a vehicle notorious for quality issues and fleet pervasiveness.

In early 2013, Chrysler CEO Sergio Marchionne announced that the first generation model will be short lived and a redesigned next generation model would appear in auto shows January 2014.

=== Changes ===
==== 2013 ====
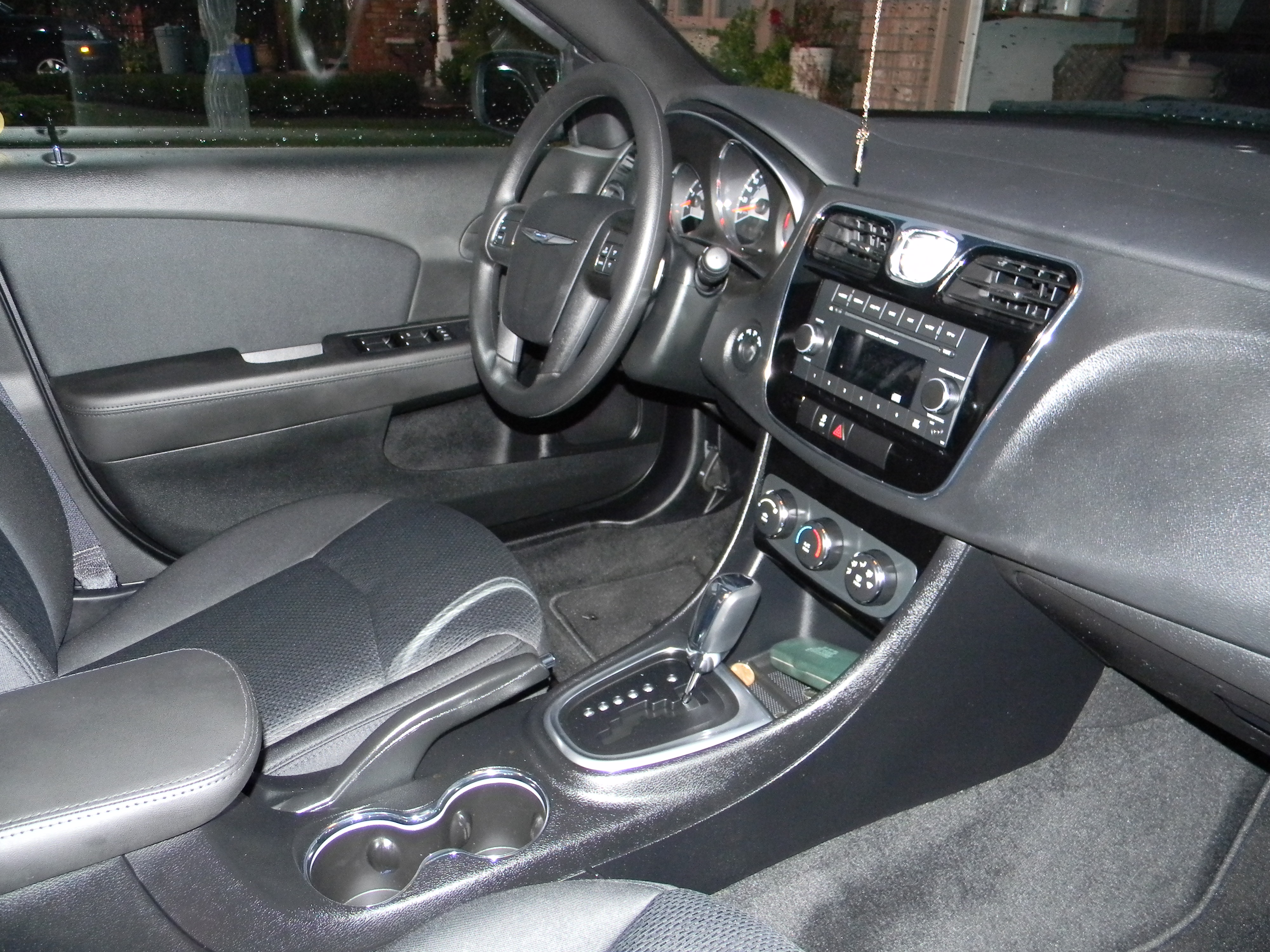
Interior

The 2013 Chrysler 200 Convertible featured revised suspensions. Prior to the 2013 model year, the suspension on convertibles was largely shared with the Sebring that preceded it. The softtop convertible now matches the sedan's revised suspension. The retractable-hardtop could not fully accommodate the changes because the stiffer suspension would have made the ride too harsh. The retractable-hardtop version was also updated to the steering rack and rear toe link that the softtop received.

In 2013 the S trim was removed and became two appearance options, S Interior and S Exterior options - that could be added to other 200 models. The two exceptions to this was the 200 S Special Edition and 200 Super S.

Mid-year in the 2013 model year, Chrysler unveiled the 2013.5 Chrysler 200 S Special Edition, made in conjunction with Carhartt. It was offered in sedan form only, and had a suggested retail price of $28,870. The car featured unique Mopar parts and suspension that were not offered previously, which lowered the car and stiffened the suspension. It also featured custom Carhartt embroidery atop the most premium interior options for the 200.

The 200 S Special Edition evolved into the 200 Super S the following year, with additional performance improvements.

==== 2014 ====
The limited edition 2014 Chrysler 200 Super S was a Mopar modified version and included two stages. Stage One enhancements include a chin spoiler, mesh upper and lower grilles with the upper grille finished in gloss black, as well as satin chrome grille and fog light trim. Side sills are included with gray or hyper black 18-inch wheels, while black chrome badges and satin chrome side molding differentiate the Super S. Additional satin chrome finishes include the rear light bar, as well as a new trunk lid spoiler and a matte black diffuser.

Stage Two enhancements are mechanical. A cold-air intake is fitted under the hood while a cat-back exhaust replaces the stock setup. A coil-over suspension provides a lowered ride height and a lower center of gravity.

=== Lancia Flavia ===
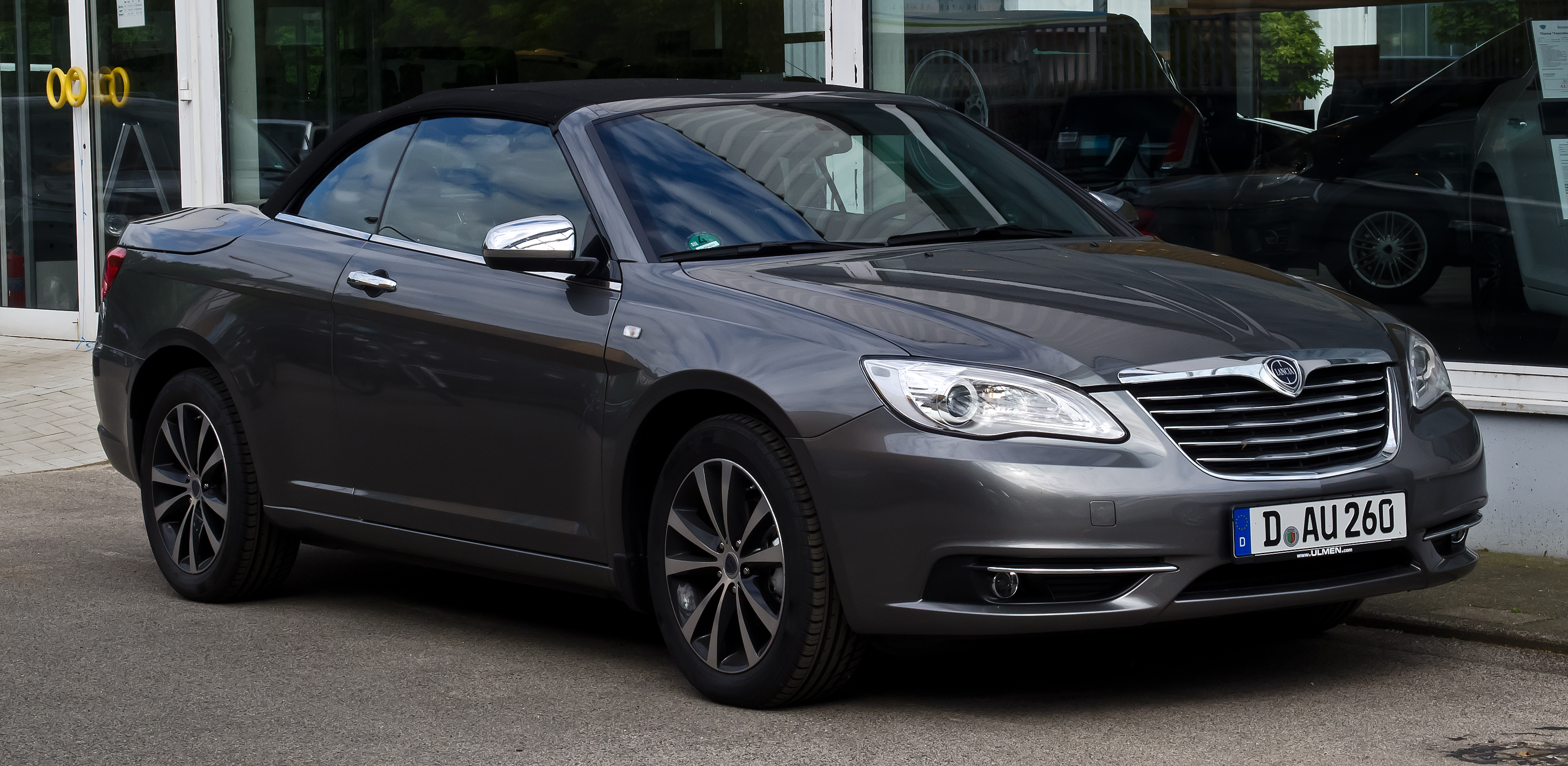
Lancia Flavia 2.4 16v convertible

In Europe between 2012 and 2014, the 200 Convertible was rebranded and marketed under the Italian Lancia marque. Both convertible and sedan versions were displayed at the 2011 Geneva Motor Show as concepts, but only the convertible saw production. The Lancia Flavia was only available in left-hand drive markets, and thus not sold in the United Kingdom or Ireland.

Chrysler discontinued production in 2014.

=== Engines ===
Chrysler
Model	Engine	Displacement	Power @ rpm	Torque @ rpm	Transmission	Years
LX	2.4 I4 GEMA	2,360 cc (144 cu in)	173 hp (129 kW; 175 PS) at 6,000 rpm	225 N⋅m (166 lb⋅ft) at 4,400 rpm	4-speed automatic	MY2011–2014
Touring	2.4 I4 GEMA	2,360 cc (144 cu in)	173 hp (129 kW; 175 PS) at 6,000 rpm	225 N⋅m (166 lb⋅ft) at 4,400 rpm	6-speed automatic	MY2011–MY2014
Limited Touring LX Z S	3.6 V6 Pentastar	3,605 cc (220.0 cu in)	283 hp (211 kW; 287 PS) at 6,400 rpm	353 N⋅m (260 lbf⋅ft) at 4,250 rpm	6-speed automatic	MY2011-2014

=== Safety ===
NHTSA 2013 Chrysler 200 FWD:
Overall:	4/5 stars
Frontal Driver:	3/5 stars
Frontal Passenger:	3/5 stars
Side Driver:	5/5 stars
Side Passenger:	4/5 stars
Side Pole Driver:	1/5 stars
Rollover:	/ 11.1%

IIHS:
Moderate overlap front	Good
Side	Good
Head restraints & seats	Good

== Second generation (2015) ==
Second generation
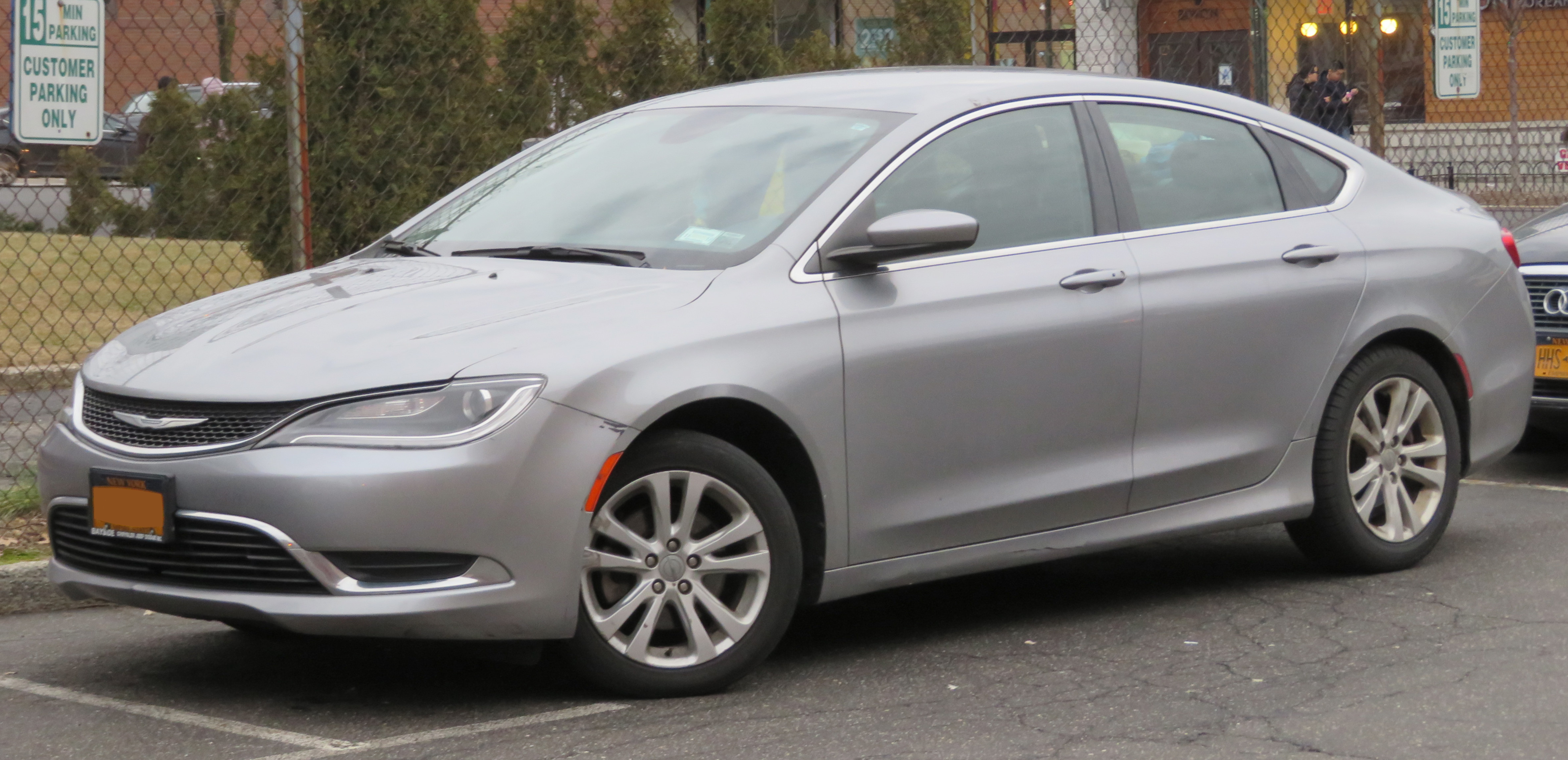

Overview
- Production: March 2014 – December 2016
- Model years: 2015–2017
- Designer: Jeff Hammoud - exterior (2012); Cristian Farcas - interior (2012)

Body and chassis
- Body style: 4-door sedan
- Layout: Front-engine, front-wheel-drive / all-wheel drive
- Platform: Compact Wide
- Related: Alfa Romeo Giulietta (2010); Dodge Dart (2013); Jeep Cherokee (2014); Chrysler Pacifica (2017)

Powertrain
- Engine: Gasoline: 2.4 L Tigershark I4; 3.6 L Pentastar V6
- Transmission: 9-speed 948TE automatic

Dimensions
- Wheelbase: 108.0 in (2,742 mm)
- Length: 192.3 in (4,884 mm)
- Width: 73.7 in (1,871 mm)
- Height: 58.7 in (1,491 mm)

The 2015 model year Chrysler 200 debuted on January 13, 2014 at the 2014 North American International Auto Show in Detroit, Michigan. Based on the Fiat Compact platform, FCA (Fiat Chrysler Automobiles) used the long wheelbase version dubbed CUSW (Compact US Wide) for the second generation Chrysler 200. It is offered in four trim levels, LX, Limited, S as well as C — and is positioned as a mid-size entry intended to compete with Toyota Camry, Nissan Altima, Honda Accord, Mazda6, Volkswagen Passat, Chevrolet Malibu, and Ford Fusion.

Becoming available in mid-2014 as an early 2015 model year vehicle, the second generation debuted at the 2014 North American International Auto Show in Detroit, Michigan, and became available in dealership showrooms shortly after.

The second-generation 200 also had the best V6 horsepower, the lowest drag-coefficient (0.27), and was the first car in its segment to have a dial-based gear shift.

The second generation is only offered in sedan form. Chrysler noted the declining demand for convertibles, and high costs to create a convertible version using the all-new platforms, as reasons for not offering a convertible version.

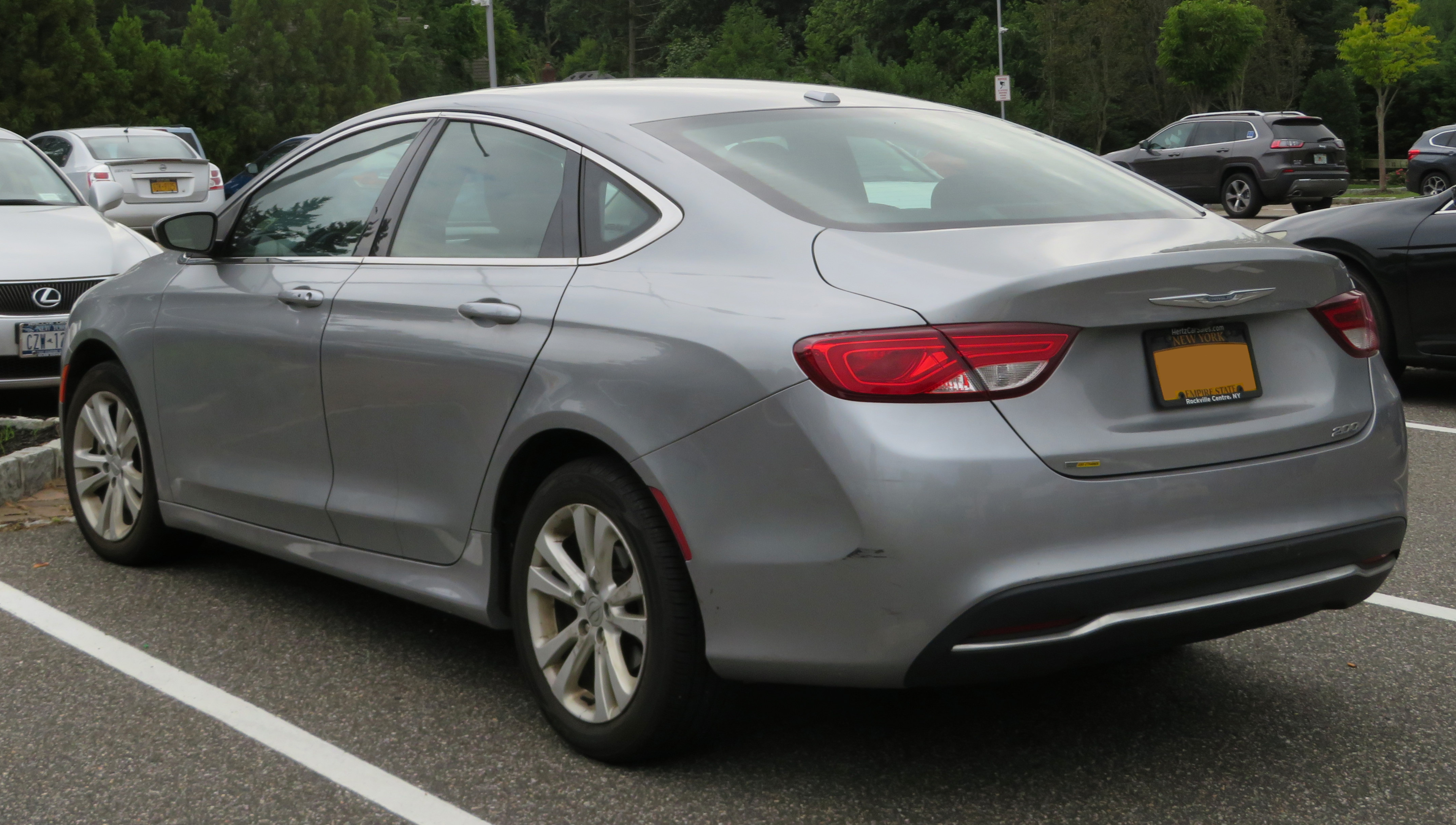
Rear view

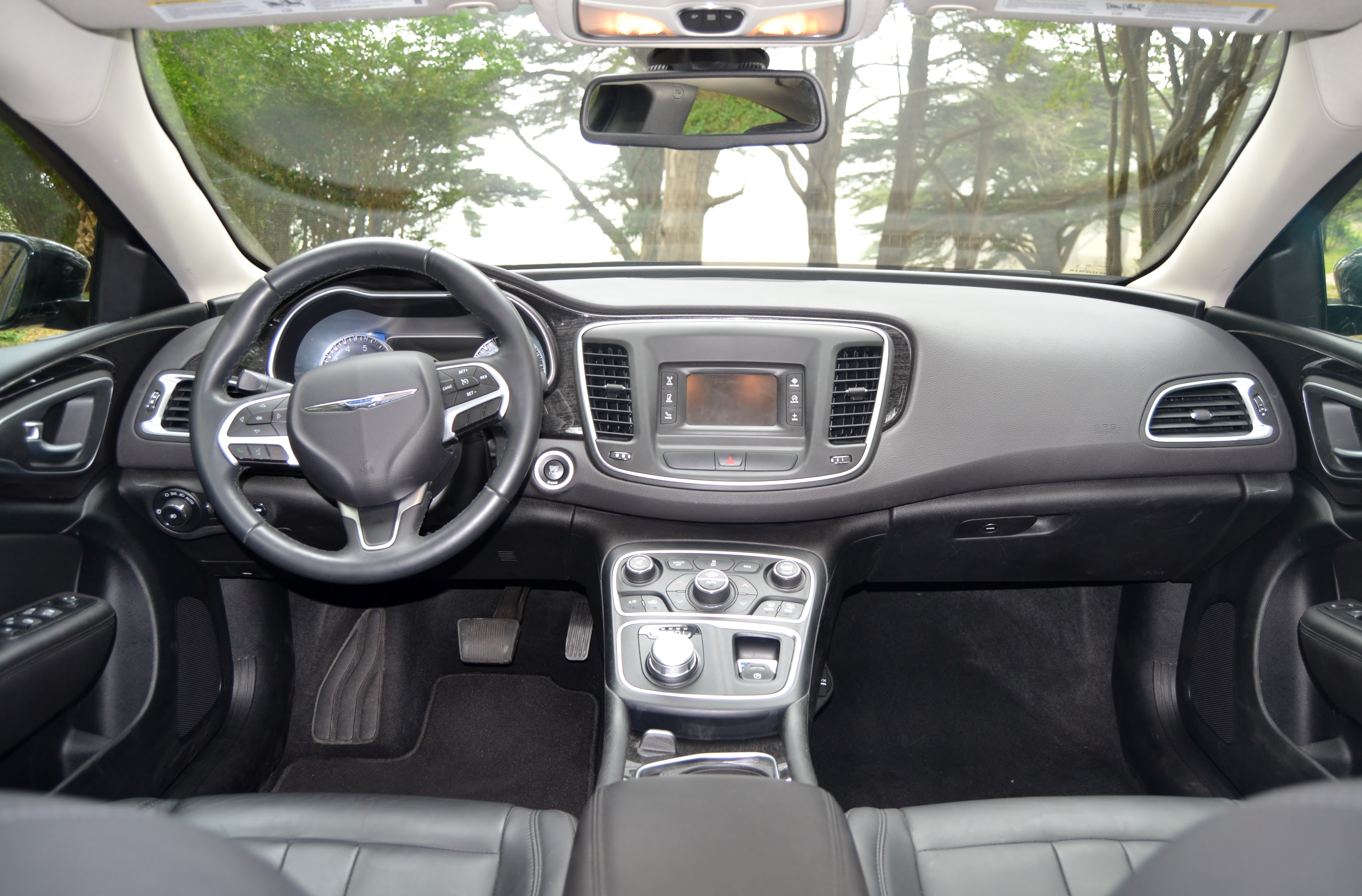
Interior

=== Models ===
At its launch, the 200 was available in base LX, Limited, sporty 200S, and top-of-the-range 200C trim levels. Midway through the 2016 model year, new Touring, Limited Platinum, and 200C Platinum trims were added in place of the previous Limited and 200C.

=== Production ===
The 200 continued in production at Sterling Heights Assembly with the plant's paint shop received upgrades to facilitate production. 2015 Chrysler 200 production assembly began in May 2014, a month prior to going on sale.

The 200 is equipped with either a 2.4 L TigerShark producing 184 hp (137 kW; 187 PS) and 173 lb⋅ft (235 N⋅m) of torque or 3.6 L Pentastar engine producing 295 hp (220 kW; 299 PS) and 262 lb⋅ft (355 N⋅m), both matched to a 9-speed automatic transmission. An all wheel drive system is available with the 3.6 L engine, including a fully disconnecting rear drive axle to improve fuel efficiency. The system detects adverse road conditions and engages, sending power to all 4 wheels. The system disengages when increased traction is no longer needed. The 200 would also offer a stop/start system to aid fuel efficiency with the 2.4 L TigerShark engine.

Production of the Chrysler 200 ended on December 2, 2016 at Sterling Heights Assembly. Chrysler restructured the 200's final model lineup to add new models and packages with fewer options for 2017. The new models debuted midyear 2016 as 2016.5 models. The new models included Touring, Limited Platinum, 200S Alloy Edition, and 200C Platinum, which replaced the Limited (Touring) and 200C (200C Platinum) models respectively. The 2017 model year production run was exactly four months, with enough dealer supply to last through midyear 2017.

=== Safety ===
NHTSA 2017 Chrysler 200 FWD:
Overall:	5/5 stars
Frontal Driver:	5/5 stars
Frontal Passenger:	5/5 stars
Side Driver:	5/5 stars
Side Passenger:	5/5 stars
Side Pole Driver:	5/5 stars
Rollover:	/ 10.7%

IIHS:
Small overlap front	Good
Moderate overlap front	Good
Side	Good
Roof strength (2015–2017)	Good
Head restraints & seats	Good

=== Discontinuation ===
After its first year in production, Fiat Chrysler Automobiles CEO Sergio Marchionne said the Chrysler 200 would "run its course" under the current Compact US Wide architecture, pointing to the car being discontinued. While in his initial announcement of this news, he criticized the car's rear-door entry - some have argued this may not be due to the car's quality or success - particularly as the second-generation Chrysler 200 has been a high volume seller for FCA.

According to CEO Marchionne: “The 200 failed because somebody thought that the rear-seat entry point inside the 200 — which is our fault, by the way — is not up to snuff. The problem: The slope of the roof crimps the entry portal. The Hyundai which we copied [presumably the Sonata] has the same problem. We didn’t copy the car, we copied the entry point to the rear seat. Dummies. I acknowledge it. Some people from design left some of their private parts on the table after we came up with that determination. But I think we’re learning from this process.”

Instead, more evidence points to FCA's stronger sales in trucks and SUVs being a primary reason for discontinuation. FCA also discontinued the Dodge Dart, FCA's other CUSW car - while maintaining production of the Jeep Cherokee SUV, and Chrysler Pacifica minivan, which are mechanically similar to the Chrysler 200, share a platform and many parts.

Marchionne had said that he would be willing to continue production of the Chrysler 200, if another automaker continued it - though he did not specify if he was seeking another manufacturer to produce the 200 as-is, or as a captive import of another vehicle. Either solution would not impact FCA's CAFE margins, thus allowing it to continue selling the cars while existing as primarily a truck manufacturer in the United States.

On July 26, 2016, FCA announced that Chrysler 200 production at the Sterling Heights plant would end in December 2016. After a short run as a 2017 model, production of the Chrysler 200 ended on December 2, 2016.

At the 2017 Detroit Auto Show, Marchionne explained the decision to end production, and not offer a replacement for the US or Canada: "I can tell you right now that both the Chrysler 200 and the Dodge Dart, as great products as they were, were the least financially rewarding enterprises that we've carried out inside FCA in the last eight years," adding "I don't know one investment that was as bad as these two were."

This strategy positions FCA in the US as largely a manufacturer of SUVs and trucks. The company had to find additional capacity for Jeep and Ram. FCA plans to move production of its Ram pickup to Sterling Heights.

== Marketing and sales ==
=== Marketing ===
For Super Bowl XLV, Chrysler purchased a 2-minute-long advertisement featuring Eminem with the motto Imported from Detroit. Chrysler was thinking about using the Chrysler 300 in the advertisement, since it had a higher retail price than the 200 and also enjoyed better press-reviews, but quickly rejected the idea since the 300 is not manufactured in the United States, but in Ontario, Canada and would not fit the company's new branding. This commercial enjoyed great popularity among viewers, with the term "Chrysler 200" being the second most-searched term on Google the day after the Super Bowl and search traffic for the vehicle going up by 685 percent on AOL Autos. Shortly after being uploaded to YouTube after the Super Bowl, the ad quickly received over 5 million views.

The Chrysler 200 also featured heavily in the London-based 24: Live Another Day spinoff series of 24. This is despite the fact that the vehicle was never sold in the UK. A legally required front numberplate is not present, the rear numberplate details are for a Ford Mondeo.

=== Sales ===
Calendar year	United States	Canada	Mexico	Europe (Lancia Flavia) (Note: Europe: 2020 EU 27 + UK + Switzerland + Norway + Iceland)
2010	255			
2011	87,099	7,474	1,527	
2012	125,476	14,125	1,280	534
2013	122,480	11,666	789	467
2014	117,363	11,655	1,156	124
2015	177,889	10,961	1,293	4
2016	57,294	6,919	233	
2017	18,457	2,841		
2018	1,043	0		
2019	47	1		
2020	9			
2021	15			
2022	3			
2023	3			
