= World Gasoline Engine =

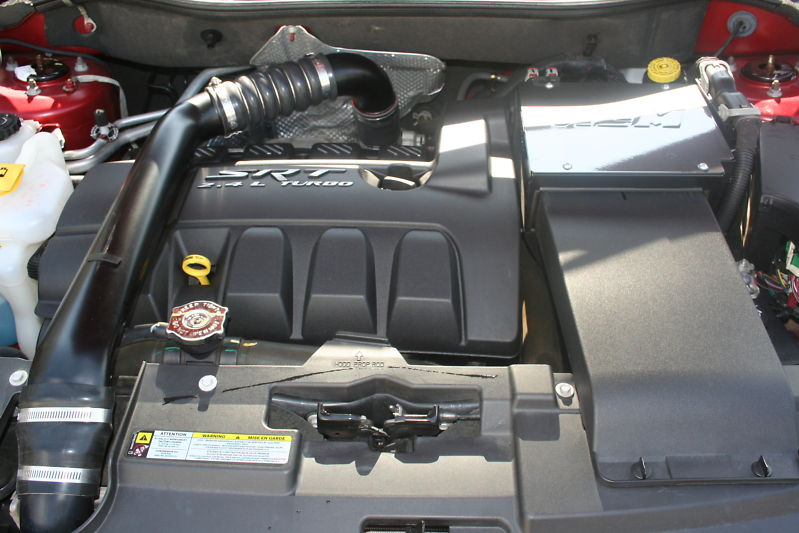
- 2.4 L Turbo engine in a Dodge Caliber SRT4

Overview
- Manufacturer: Global Engine Manufacturing Alliance; Chrysler (now Stellantis North America)
- Also called: Tigershark; World Gas engine; WGE
- Production: 2007–2012 (GEMA); 2012–2023 (Chrysler)

Layout
- Configuration: Straight-4
- Displacement: 1.8 L; 109.7 cu in (1,798 cc); 2.0 L; 121.9 cu in (1,998 cc); 2.4 L; 144.0 cu in (2,360 cc)
- Cylinder bore: 86 mm (3.39 in); 88 mm (3.46 in)
- Piston stroke: 77 mm (3.03 in); 82 mm (3.23 in); 86 mm (3.39 in); 97 mm (3.82 in)
- Cylinder block material: Aluminum
- Cylinder head material: Aluminum
- Valvetrain: SOHC & DOHC 4 Valves x Cyl with VVT; MultiAir 2
- Compression ratio: 10.0:1, 10.2:1, 10.5:1

Combustion
- Turbocharger: On 2.4 L SRT4 version
- Fuel system: Sequential MPFI
- Fuel type: Gasoline
- Oil system: Wet sump
- Cooling system: Water-cooled

Output
- Power output: 148–285 hp (110–213 kW)
- Torque output: 125–179 lb⋅ft (169–243 N⋅m)

Chronology
- Predecessor: Chrysler 1.8, 2.0 & 2.4 engine
- Successor: GME

The World Gasoline Engine is a family of straight-4 piston engines, based on the Global Engine Alliance design.

Three engines have been produced: a 1.8 L, a 2.0 L, and a 2.4 L. The initial design of the engine block and cylinder head was handled by Hyundai as part of the Global Engine Alliance. The engines feature an aluminum engine block with siamesed cast iron cylinder liners (which do not allow coolant to flow between adjacent liners). By using cylinder liners, the engine's bore can be altered, therefore the displacement as well, just by adding a different set of cylinder liners. The engine also features an aluminum cylinder head with double overhead camshafts and variable valve timing.

== 1.8 ==
The 1.8L is a dual overhead cam (DOHC) inline 4-cylinder gasoline engine capable of 148 hp (110 kW) and 125 lb⋅ft (169 N⋅m) of torque. The engine has displacement of 1.8 L; 109.7 cu in (1,798 cc) with a bore of 3.38 in (86 mm) and a stroke of 3.05 in (77 mm). The compression ratio is 10.5:1.

The 1.8L DOHC inline 4-cylinder engine served as the standard engine in the Dodge Caliber SE and SXT trim for the 2007–2009 model years.

Applications:

- 2007–2009 Dodge Caliber SE and SXT, 148 hp (110 kW) and 125 lb⋅ft (169 N⋅m) torque

== 2.0 ==
The 2.0L DOHC inline four-cylinder gasoline engine is capable of 158 hp (118 kW) and produces 141 lb⋅ft (191 N⋅m) of torque. The engine has a displacement of 2.0 L; 121.9 cu in (1,998 cc) with a bore and a stroke of 3.38 in × 3.38 in (86 mm × 86 mm). The compression ratio of the engine is 10.5:1. The 2.0 L engine was offered by Dodge in the Dodge Caliber. Outside North America, the 2.0 was the base engine for the 2007 Chrysler Sebring and 2008 Dodge Avenger.

Applications:

- 2007–2012 Dodge Caliber SE and SXT, 158 hp (118 kW) and 141 lb⋅ft (191 N⋅m) torque
- 2007–2017 Jeep Patriot (4×2 models only)
- 2007–2017 Jeep Compass (4×2 models only)
- Dodge Avenger (outside North America)
- Chrysler Sebring (outside North America)

== 2.4 ==
The 2.4 L, 172 hp (128 kW) engine was used by Dodge in the R/T trim line of the Caliber. The dual overhead cam (DOHC) inline four-cylinder engine had 2.4 L; 144.0 cu in (2,360 cc) of displacement with a bore and a stroke of 3.46 in × 3.82 in (88 mm × 97 mm). A 285 hp (213 kW) turbocharged variant of this engine was used in the high-performance SRT4 version of the Caliber.

Applications:

- 2007–2010 Chrysler Sebring
- 2011–2014 Chrysler 200 / Lancia Flavia
- 2008–2014 Dodge Avenger
- 2007–2011 Dodge Caliber R/T, 172 hp (128 kW) and SRT4, 285 hp (213 kW)
- 2009–2020 Dodge Journey
- 2011–2016 Fiat Freemont (Brazilian market)
- 2007–2017 Jeep Compass
- 2007–2017 Jeep Patriot

== Tigershark ==
The Tigershark engine family is the name for the next generation of World Gasoline Engines, with work starting on them shortly after Fiat's acquisition of Chrysler. The major differences compared to the first generation are the updated valvetrain and intakes.

=== 2.0 ===
The 2.0 L Tigershark DOHC inline 4-cylinder gasoline engine has dual-variable valve timing and produces 160 hp (119 kW) and 148 lb⋅ft (201 N⋅m) of torque. It utilizes a bore and stroke of 88 mm × 82 mm (3.46 in × 3.23 in) and a 10.2:1 compression ratio.

Applications:

Year(s)	Model	Power	Torque
2013–2016	Dodge Dart	160 hp (119 kW) at 6400 rpm	148 lb⋅ft (201 N⋅m) at 4600 rpm
2015–2022	Jeep Cherokee (KL) (China)	155 hp (116 kW) at 6200 rpm	140 lb⋅ft (190 N⋅m) at 4600 rpm
2016–2022	Jeep Renegade (China)	155 hp (116 kW) at 6200 rpm	140 lb⋅ft (190 N⋅m) at 4600 rpm

=== 2.4 ===
The 2.4 L Tigershark SOHC inline 4-cylinder gasoline engine uses MultiAir 2 variable valve timing and variable valve lift technology and produces 184 hp (137 kW) and 174 lb⋅ft (236 N⋅m) of torque. Only Multi-Air heads feature electro-hydraulic variable valve timing and lift, although only on the intake side. The system is based on FIAT technology. It utilizes a bore and stroke of 88 mm × 97 mm (3.46 in × 3.82 in) and a 10.0:1 compression ratio.

Applications:

Year(s)	Model	Power	Torque
2013–2016	Dodge Dart	184 hp (137 kW) at 6250 rpm	174 lb⋅ft (236 N⋅m) at 4800 rpm
2014–2023	Jeep Cherokee	184 hp (137 kW) at 6400 rpm	171 lb⋅ft (232 N⋅m) at 4600 rpm
2015–2017	Chrysler 200	184 hp (137 kW) at 6250 rpm	173 lb⋅ft (235 N⋅m) at 4600 rpm
2015–2021	Jeep Renegade	180 hp (134 kW) at 6400 rpm	175 lb⋅ft (237 N⋅m) at 3900 rpm
2015–2022	Ram ProMaster City	178 hp (133 kW) at 6400 rpm	174 lb⋅ft (236 N⋅m) at 3800 rpm
2016–2018	Fiat 500X	180 hp (134 kW) at 6400 rpm	175 lb⋅ft (237 N⋅m) at 3900 rpm
2017–2022	Jeep Compass	184 hp (137 kW) at 6400 rpm	179 lb⋅ft (243 N⋅m) at 4000 rpm
2017–2021	Fiat Toro	184 hp (137 kW) at 6400 rpm	179 lb⋅ft (243 N⋅m) at 4000 rpm

== See also ==
- Hyundai Theta engine – Hyundai's GEMA-built engines
- Mitsubishi 4B1 engine – Mitsubishi's GEMA-built engines
- List of Chrysler engines
