= Global Engine Alliance =

American engine manufacturing company

Dundee Engine Plant formerly Global Engine Alliance LLC
- GEMA corporate logo
- Type: Joint venture
- Industry: Automotive engineering
- Founded: May 2002
- Headquarters: Dundee, Michigan
- Key people: Bruce A. Braumbach (General Manager)
- Products: Engines
- Parent: Chrysler(now Stellantis North America)
- Website: GEMAengine.com

Global Engine Alliance LLC, began as a joint venture of Chrysler, Mitsubishi Motors, and Hyundai Motor Company for developing a line of shared engines.

In September 2009, Chrysler purchased Mitsubishi and Hyundai's shares, after 5 years of allied research and development, making its Dundee, Michigan plant a wholly owned subsidiary of what was then Chrysler Group LLC.

== Global Engine Manufacturing Alliance ==
Global Engine Manufacturing Alliance, LLC (GEMA) was the manufacturing arm of the Global Engine Alliance and consisted of five factories worldwide. One factory was announced in 2003 as being based in Auburn Hills, Michigan. Production began in 2005, with an annual capacity of approximately two million engines; each plant was capable of producing 420,000. Twenty different automobile models from the three companies were to use the engines. Chrysler had expected to use GEMA engines in ten models and projects, and buy up to 840,000 GEMA engines annually.

The Dundee plants were purchased by Chrysler in December, 2012, and renamed the Chrysler Dundee Engine Plant(s). After Chrysler's assimilation into FCA, the plant simply became known as the Dundee Engine Plant.

== Design ==
Hyundai was initially responsible for leading the design of the base engine, while the Chrysler Group and Mitsubishi were involved in making other important engineering contributions pertaining to the design. The design features Siamese bores, an aluminium block with cast-iron cylinder liners, and an aluminium head. Different cylinder liners could be fitted to increase or decrease displacement depending on manufacturers needs. Each manufacturer configured their variants of the initial design differently based on their engineering needs and standards, so consumers may experience very different power, fuel efficiency, and "feel" from each manufacturer.

== See also ==
- Chrysler World engine - Chrysler's GEMA built engines
- Mitsubishi 4B1 engine - Mitsubishi's GEMA built engines
- Hyundai Theta engine - Hyundai's GEMA built engines
