= Chrysler Phaeton =

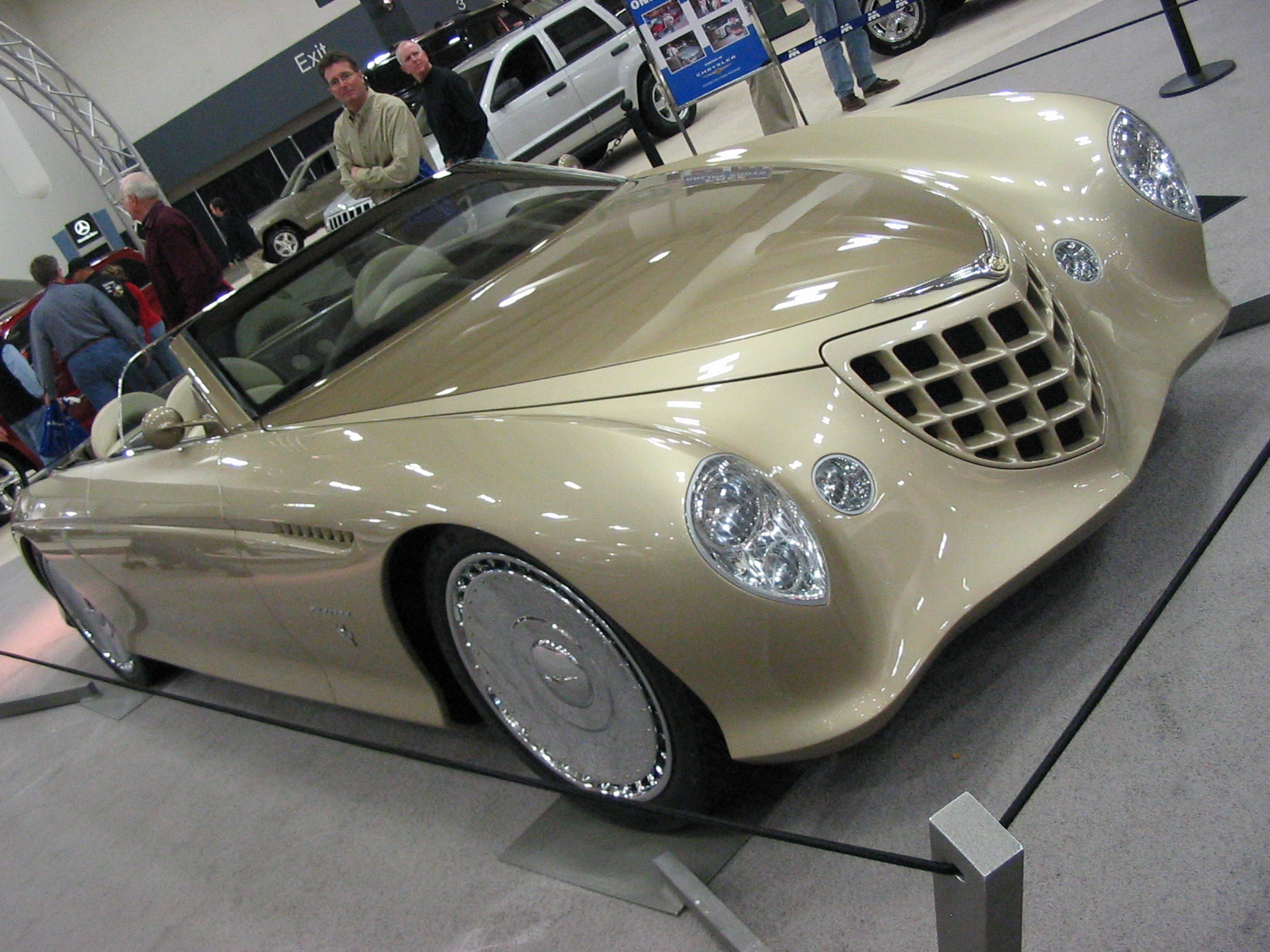

Overview
- Manufacturer: Chrysler
- Production: 1997
- Designer: Tom Gale

Body and chassis
- Class: Concept car
- Body style: 4-door cabriolet sedan dual-cowl phaeton
- Layout: FR layout

Powertrain
- Engine: 5.4L (5400 cc, 330 ci) Dodge/Chrysler V12
- Transmission: 4-speed 31TH automatic

Dimensions
- Wheelbase: 3353 mm (132 in)
- Length: 5461 mm (215 in)
- Width: 1981 mm (78 in)
- Height: 1397 mm (55 in)

The Chrysler Phaeton was a four-door convertible sedan concept car built by Chrysler in 1997.

== Background ==
The Phaeton was inspired by Chrysler's historic Newport Phaeton, and the Imperial Parade Phaeton. John E. Herlitz, Chrysler Corporation's Vice President of Product Design, said, "Phaeton embraces and contemporizes elegant, classic design cues from historic touring automobiles of the 1930s, 40s and 50s."

The dual cowl four-door hard-top convertible design was inspired by Chrysler's dual cowl 1940 Newport parade car, a vehicle used primarily for transporting dignitaries and members of elite families during that time period. "With Phaeton, we expanded the use of today's convertible by giving it four doors and two windshields," said K. Neil Walling, Chrysler Corporation's Design Director. "We took an elegant design execution that was originally intended for the wealthy and created a practical, contemporary convertible."

The Phaeton features a retractable rear compartment windshield. "Chrysler Phaeton effectively captures classic images from the Chrysler LHX and Chrysler Atlantic and translates them into a convertible format," said Walling.

The interior features cream and brown-colored leather trim, woven cream leather inserts, satin metal details, and Zebrano wood accents. Both front and rear passenger compartments are separate and have their own radio, climate controls, arm rests and center consoles. Speedometer and tachometer gauges are also featured in both compartments which allow rear passengers to monitor vehicle performance at a glance.

== Specifications ==
The Phaeton is powered by a 48-valve 5.4 liter aluminum V12 engine, made from two 2.7L Chrysler LH V6 engines, and producing 425 hp (317 kW). Ride and handling are handled by a double wishbone suspension up front, and an independent double "A" arm suspension in the rear, similar to that of the Dodge Viper. The body-on-frame, rear wheel drive car used a four-speed automatic with a Dana 40 axle. It rides on 22x8 inch cast aluminum wheels with four wheel disc brakes.

"We wanted Phaeton's performance characteristics to be comparable to that of its inspirational father, the Newport," said Walling. "After all, the Newport was the pace car of the Indianapolis 500 in 1941."

Measurements are in inches/millimeters, unless otherwise specified. front track: 63.0/1600 rear track: 61.5/1562 tires: Goodyear front P245/55R22 rear P245/55R22

== Production ==
The Chrysler Phaeton remained a concept car and did not enter series production.

== In popular media ==
The car was also included as a selection in the PlayStation video game Gran Turismo 2 as a prize car that could only be won by completing the Muscle Car Cup in Laguna Seca Raceway . The car is listed under the manufacturer Dodge.

== Gallery ==
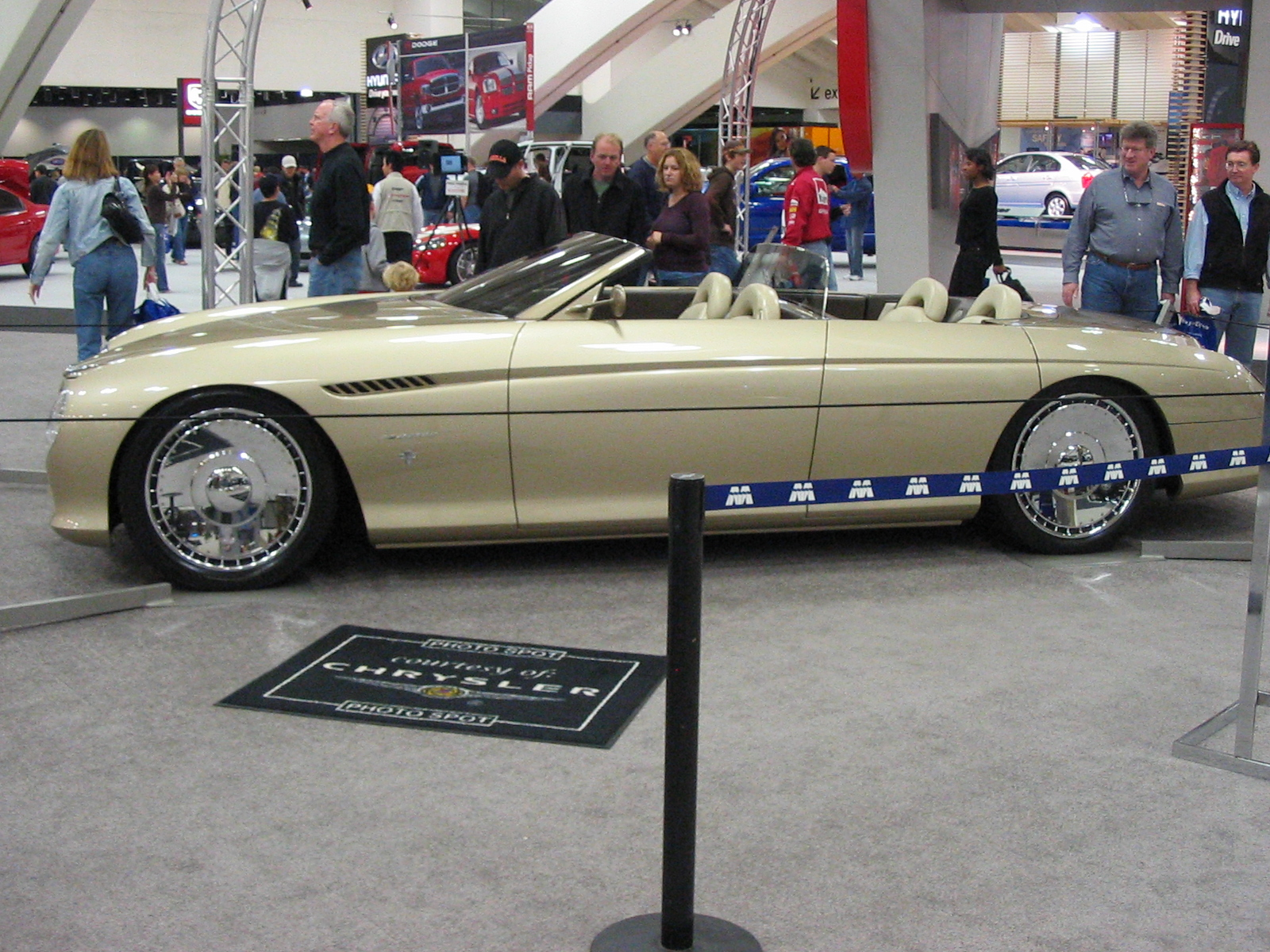
Side

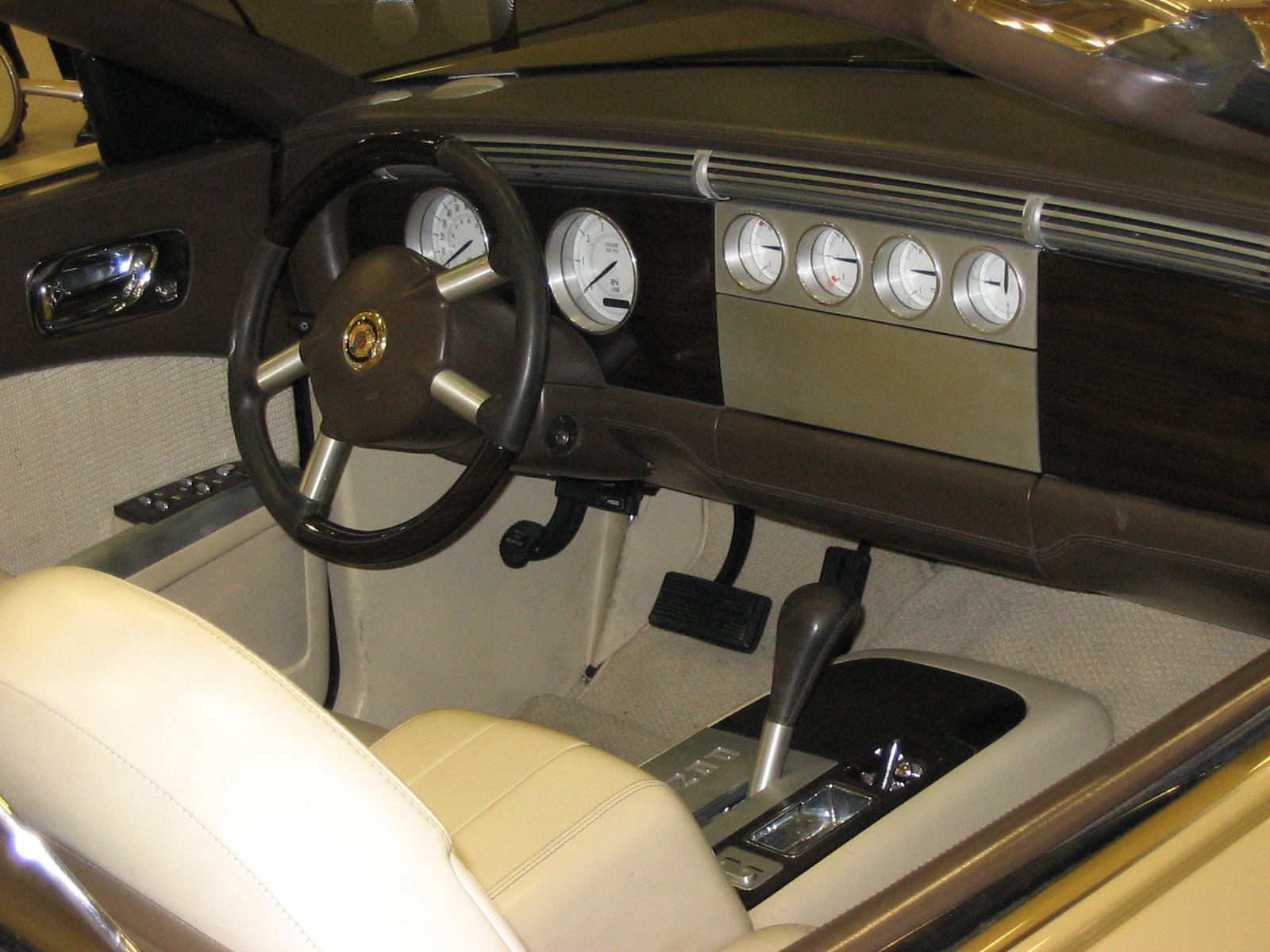
Interior
