= Chrysler Imperial Parade Phaeton =

Imperial Parade Phaeton
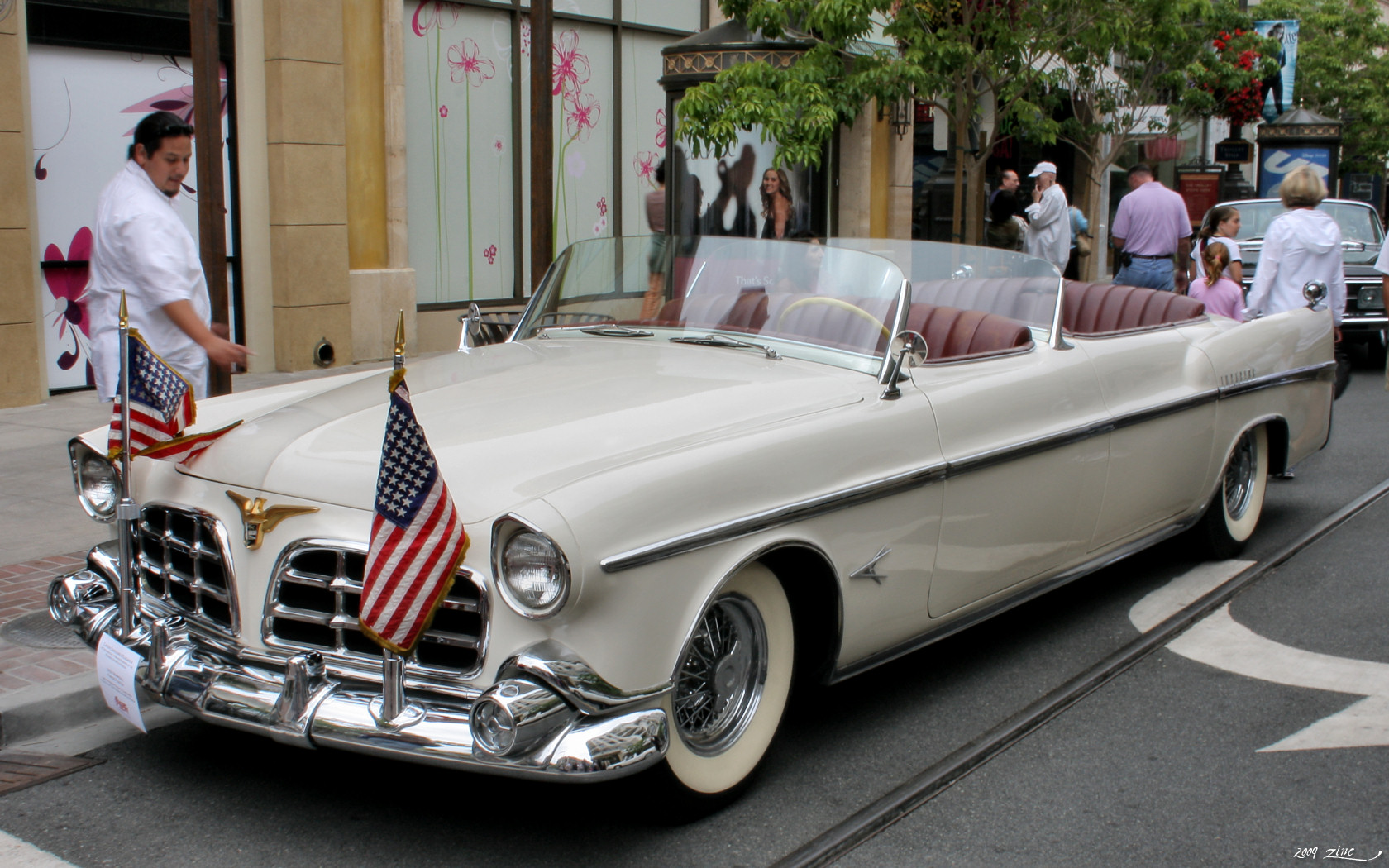
- The "Detroit" Parade Phaeton, now owned by the Petersen Automotive Museum

Overview
- Type: Limited edition parade vehicle
- Manufacturer: Chrysler
- Production: 1952

Powertrain
- Engine: 331 cu in (5.4 L) Hemi V8
- Transmission: 2-speed PowerFlite automatic

Dimensions
- Wheelbase: 147.5 in (3,746 mm)
- Length: 240 in (6,096 mm)

Three Chrysler Imperial Parade Phaetons were produced in 1952 by Chrysler as ceremonial vehicles. They were styled by Virgil Exner and were in many ways a preview of the new "100 Million Dollar" styling that would debut in 1955 on the newly separate Imperial marque and on other full-size Chrysler Corporation Cars. The "Imperial Parade Phaeton" moniker came along only later; when first publicized, Chrysler named the car the "Chrysler Phaeton."

== Details ==
The cars were based on stretched (to 147.5 in) 1952 Imperial Crown Limousine chassis and carried completely custom bodywork with the exception of the 1951 Imperial grille, bumpers and front and rear trim. Almost uniquely for a postwar car, they were dual-cowl phaetons, with separate front and rear passenger compartments, each with its own windshield. There were no side windows, and a lightweight Dacron convertible top covered only the rear compartment during inclement weather, and was manually retracted beneath the rear-hinged deck lid when not in use. The rear doors were suicide doors and had no exterior handles. In 1940, Chrysler built six limited production cars with the same approach to uniqueness called the Chrysler Newport Phaeton also using an Imperial chassis.

Under the custom bodywork, the mechanicals were standard top-of-the-line Chrysler for the period, with a 331 cubic inch (5.42 L) FirePower V8 engine, torque converter transmission, and power steering.

Three cars were built. One was for New York City, the second for Los Angeles, and the third was intended to be a gift to the White House, but the gift was refused as against the then rules for receiving gifts. Instead, the third car was nominally based in Detroit and was used around the country. The cars continued to be owned and serviced by the Chrysler Corporation.

After three years of service, the cars were brought back to the factory in 1955 to be updated to 1956 Imperial appearance, in which form they continue to exist to the present day. The front and rear, including grilles, bumpers and trim, were replaced. Internally, the engines were updated with 4-barrel carburetors, and fully automatic Powerflite transmissions were installed. The cars were all repainted. After the rebuild, the cars were donated to the respective cities.

A revival was introduced by Chrysler as a concept car, called the Chrysler Phaeton in 1997.

== New York car ==
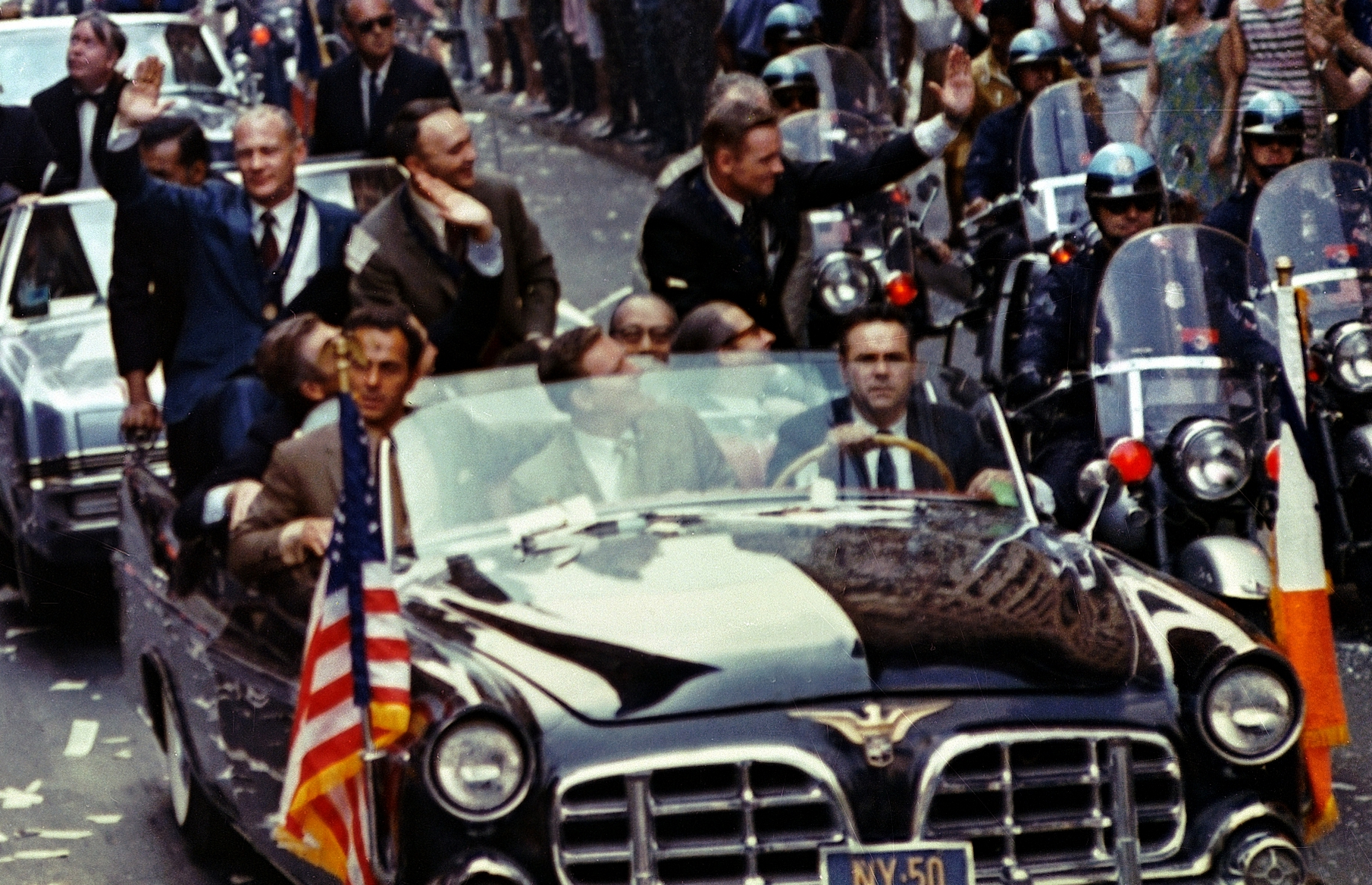
The Apollo 11 astronauts ride in New York's Chrysler Imperial Parade Phaeton in a ticker-tape parade

The New York car was originally painted in black with a grey interior. In the 1955 rebuild, it was repainted off-white with a red interior. It must have been repainted in black again before the August 11, 1969 parade with the Apollo 11 astronauts as evidenced in the photo. The car remains in the possession of the City of New York, and was rebuilt in the early 1980s. At this time, it was repainted in black again, but retained the red interior.

The Phaeton is still occasionally used for official functions, parades and ceremonies. It has carried many dignitaries, celebrities, and notables over the years.

== Los Angeles car ==
The Los Angeles car was painted cream with a red interior, and was first used in the 1 January 1953 Tournament of Roses Parade, "carrying Vice-President and Mrs. Richard Nixon" and their daughters. The upholstery was dyed to match the hybrid rose recently produced in Los Angeles, Rosa 'Chrysler Imperial'. One float in that 1953 parade--"Moonlight and Roses"--was sponsored by Chrysler and by the Southern California Floral Association, and it featured 53,000 blooms from the new rose variety.

Publicity surrounding the car's debut in Los Angeles included more details of its construction: "45 inches from ground to cowl center, and 57 inches to the top of its front windshield....two-spoke steering wheel with an automatic clock in its hub...a separate spare-tire compartment reached through a door behind the rear bumper; a panel in the partition between front and rear seats containing a clock, two ash receivers and two cigar lighters, and two other complete smoking sets built into the rear doors."

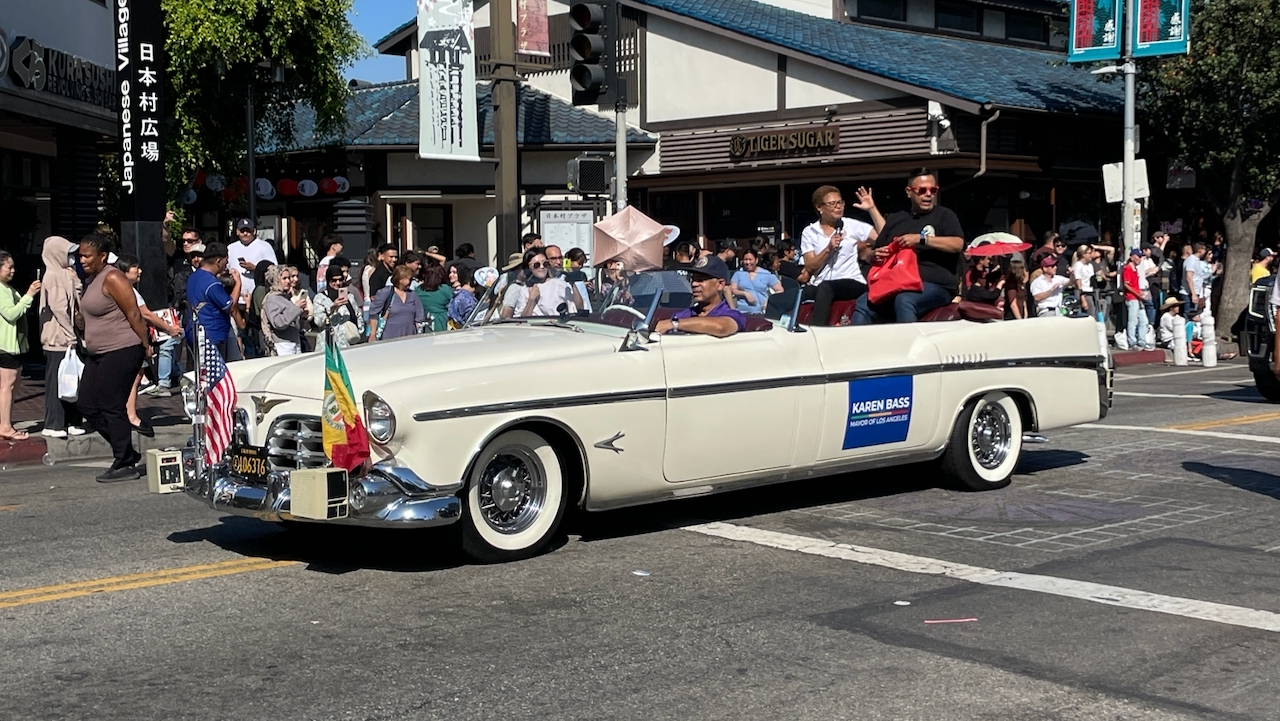
Mayor Karen Bass at a parade in the Los Angeles car in 2025

On 13-22 March 1953 the Phaeton was exhibited at the Greater Eastbay Auto Show in Oakland. It was subsequently used up and down the West Coast. Roy Rogers, Dale Evans and family rode it in the Star of Bethlehem parade in Van Nuys on 5 December 1953. When updated in 1955, the vehicle was repainted metallic silver-blue with an off-white interior. It is seen in that form in the 1959 film of the Broadway musical Li'l Abner, transporting the "General Bullmoose" character. It was later restored and repainted white, retaining its off-white interior. The interior was more recently replaced in red leather. It is still in the possession of the City of Los Angeles and takes part in official parades and celebrations. Its use in other Hollywood films includes 1953’s How to Marry a Millionaire transporting Lauren Bacall, Victor Mature's limousine in 1959’s The Big Circus, the 1960 Jerry Lewis film Cinderfella, and 1962’s Sweet Bird of Youth. A more recent appearance was in the 1987 Charles Bronson film Assassination.

== Detroit car ==
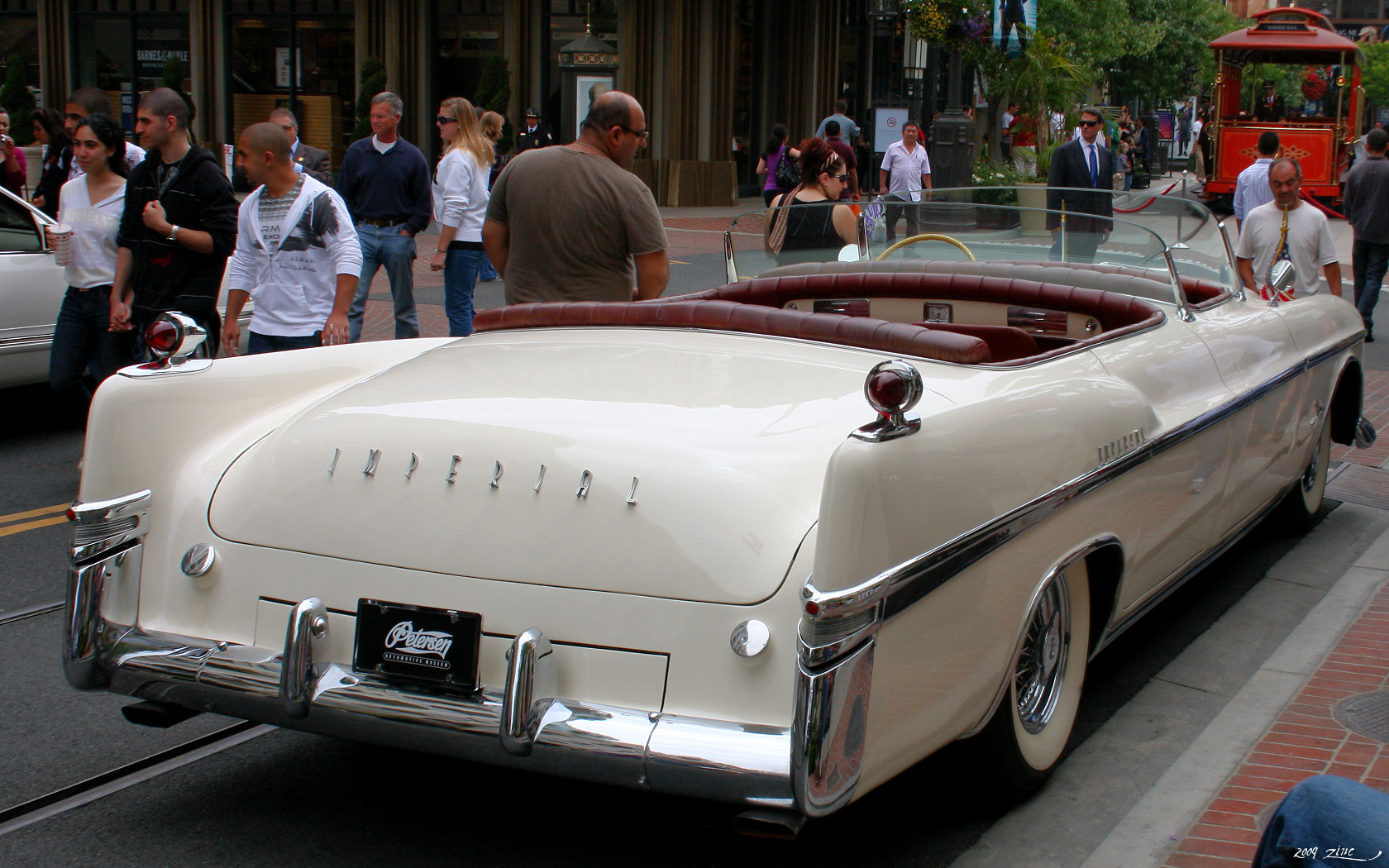
The Detroit car from the rear

The Detroit car was originally painted in a metallic green with a natural pigskin interior, and was used in events around the country. It was repainted in desert sand with a red interior in its 1955 rebuild. This Phaeton was sold and ended up in private hands, becoming part of Paul Stern's collection for some time before being sold to the Imperial Palace collection in Las Vegas, Nevada where it was displayed for many years. In 2001, with the mass of the Imperial Palace collection being broken up, it was sold to Robert Petersen and is now on display at the Petersen Automotive Museum in Los Angeles. The car is currently in white with a red interior.

In 1954, Chrysler shipped the car (by truck) to Florida for the opening of the Sunshine Skyway Bridge spanning Lower Tampa Bay; Chrysler's publicity gave the vehicle's production cost as $72,000.
