= Phaeton body =

Style of open automobile, popular in the early 20th-century

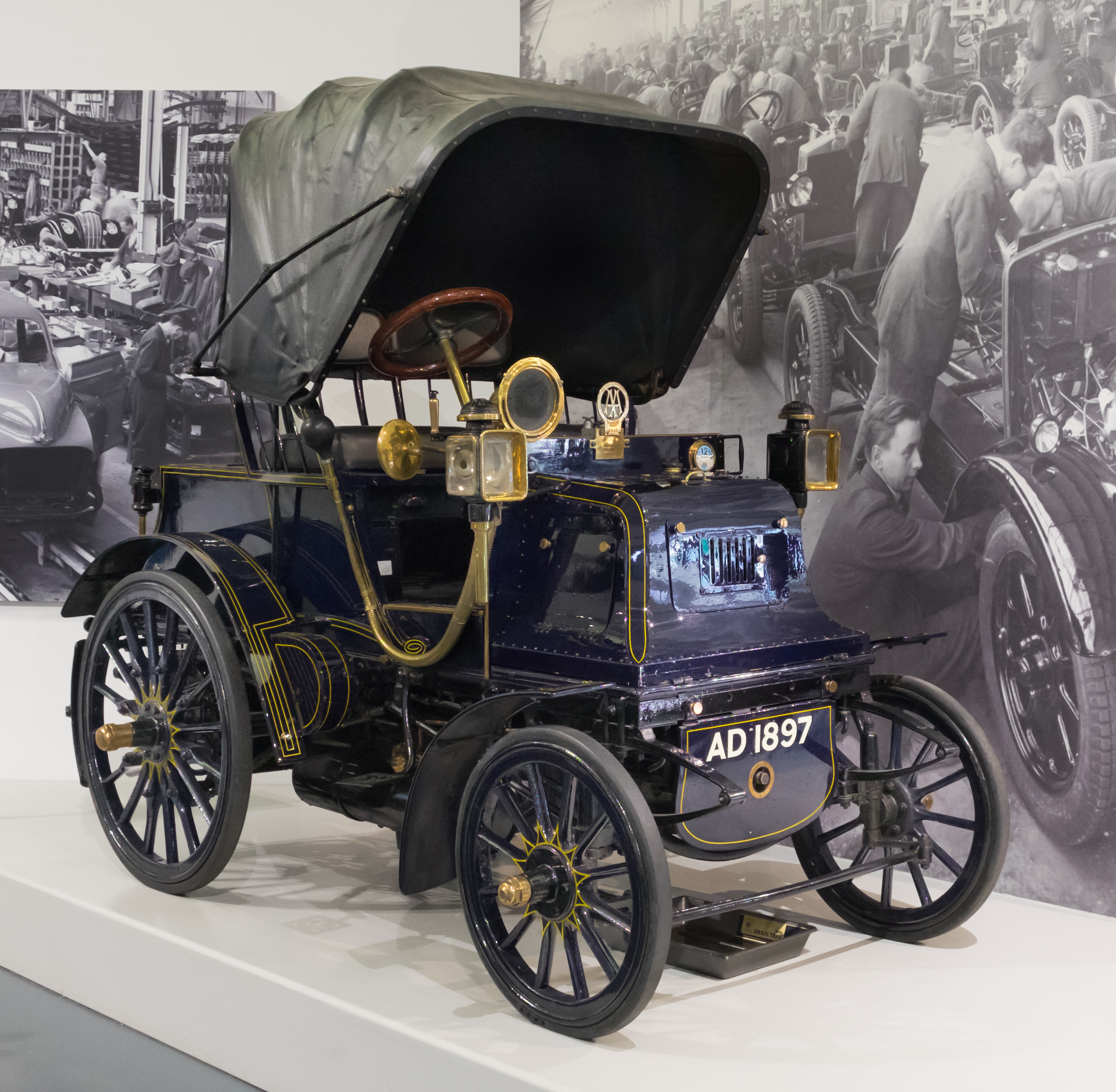
1897 Daimler Grafton phaeton

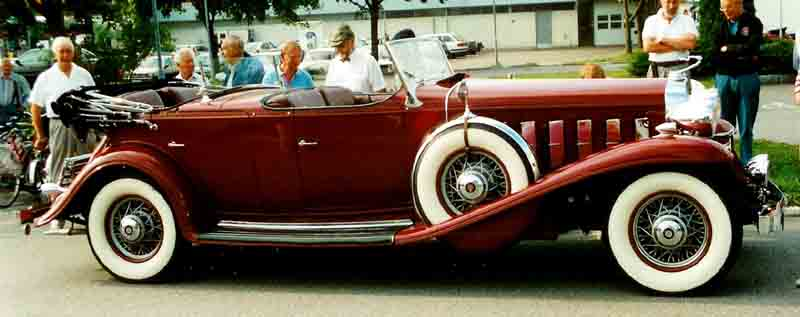
Dual cowl 1932 Cadillac V-16

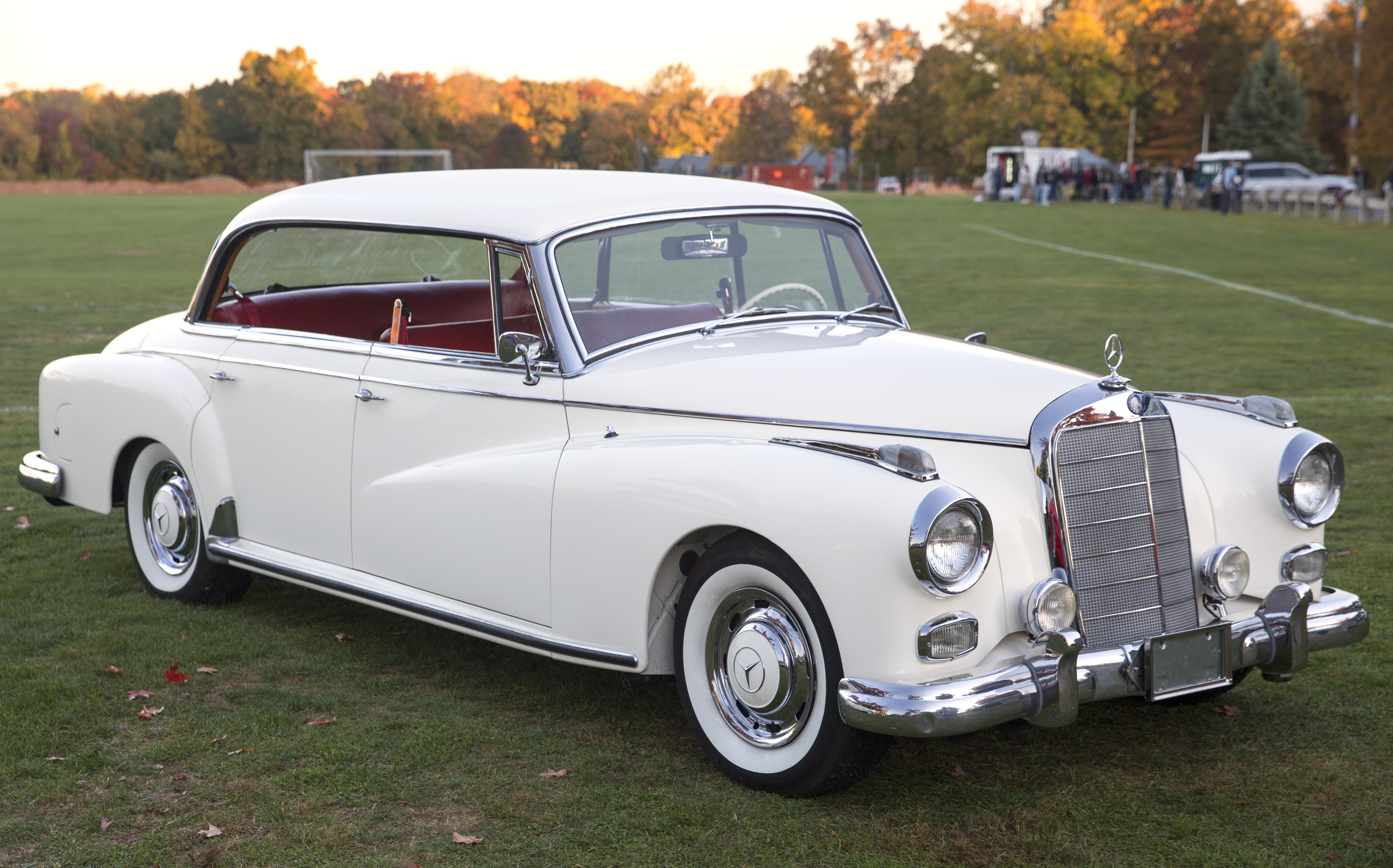
The Mercedes-Benz 300d was marketed as a "pillarless phaeton"

A phaeton is a style of open automobile without any fixed weather protection, which was popular from the 1900s until the 1930s. It is an automotive equivalent of the horse-drawn fast, lightweight phaeton carriage.

A popular style in the US from the mid–1920s and continuing into the first half of the 1930s was the dual cowl phaeton, with a cowl separating the rear passengers from the driver and front passenger.

Phaetons fell from favor when closed cars and convertible body styles became widely available during the 1930s. Eventually, the term "phaeton" became so widely and loosely applied that almost any vehicle with two axles and a row or rows of seats across the body could be called a phaeton. Convertibles and pillarless hardtops were sometimes marketed as "phaetons" after actual phaetons were phased out.

== History ==
The term phaeton had historically referred to a light, open, four-wheeled horse-drawn carriage. When automobiles arrived, it was applied to a light two-seater with minimal coachwork. The term was interchangeable with spyder, derived from a light form of phaeton carriage known as a spider. Originally meant to denote a faster and lighter vehicle than a touring car, the two terms eventually became interchangeable.

Phaetons were the most popular choice in the early days of automobiles. They were typically an open four-door with no side windows and a separate windshield. They usually shared the cowl and front doors of their roadster equivalent, but featured the additional rear doors and extended body tub. A phaeton differs from a convertible in having no winding or sliding windows in the doors or the body.

A detachable folding or rigid roof could be added before a drive in preparation for inclement weather, and side curtains or screens could be installed once the roof was in place. This was mainly temporary and partial relief rather than the more permanent, watertight protection offered by a convertible. As a result, a phaeton was much lighter than the sturdier, weather-ready convertible. Since the body was entirely open, it was easy to add or remove an extra row of seating where space had been left in the original construction.

Fully closed sedan and coupe body designs became less expensive and more popular by the end of the 1920s. The "touring" descriptor was upgraded to the "phaeton" moniker.

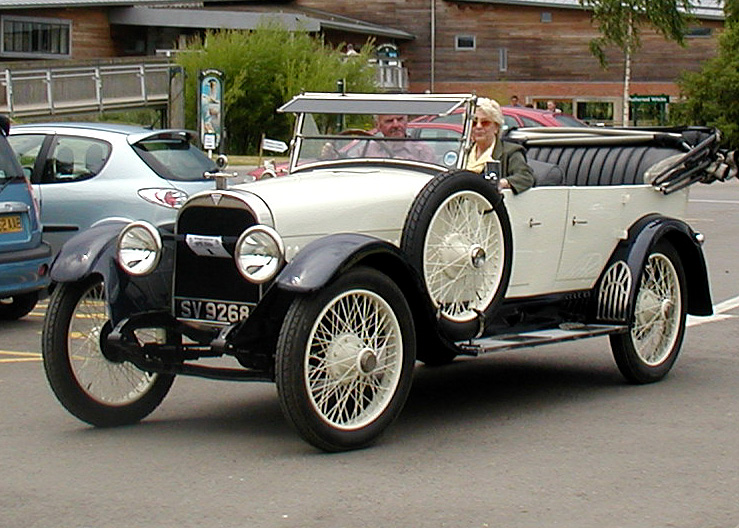
1917 Hudson phaeton

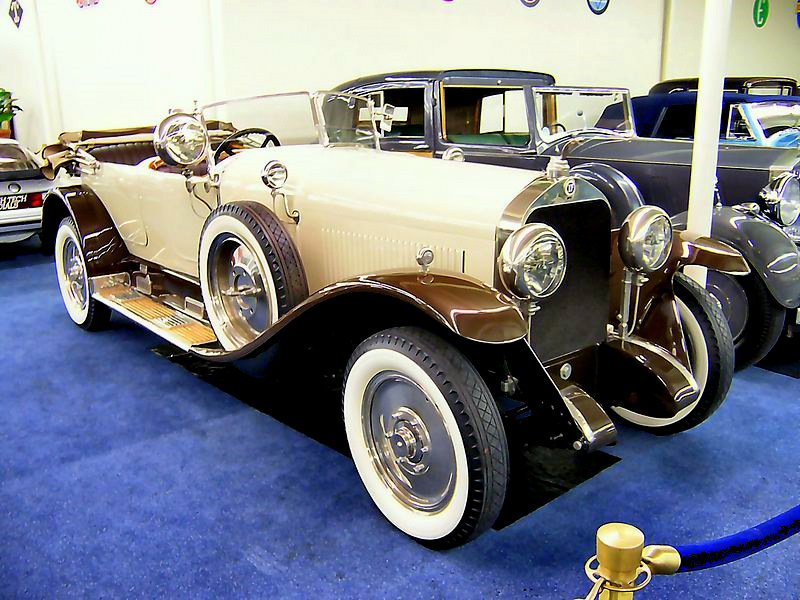
Isotta Fraschini Tipo 8 Sala

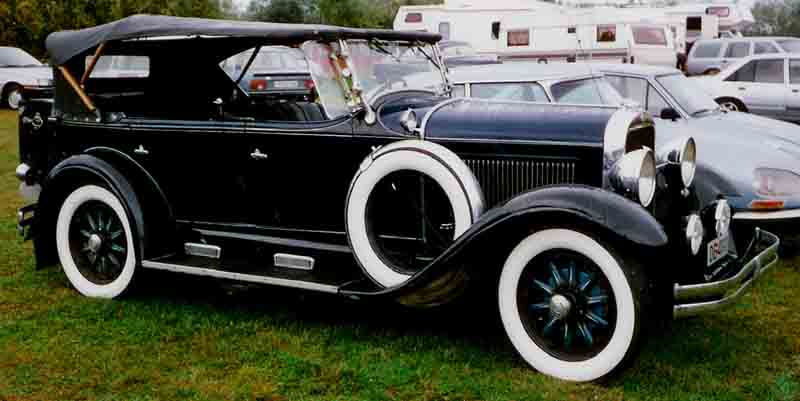
1930 Studebaker

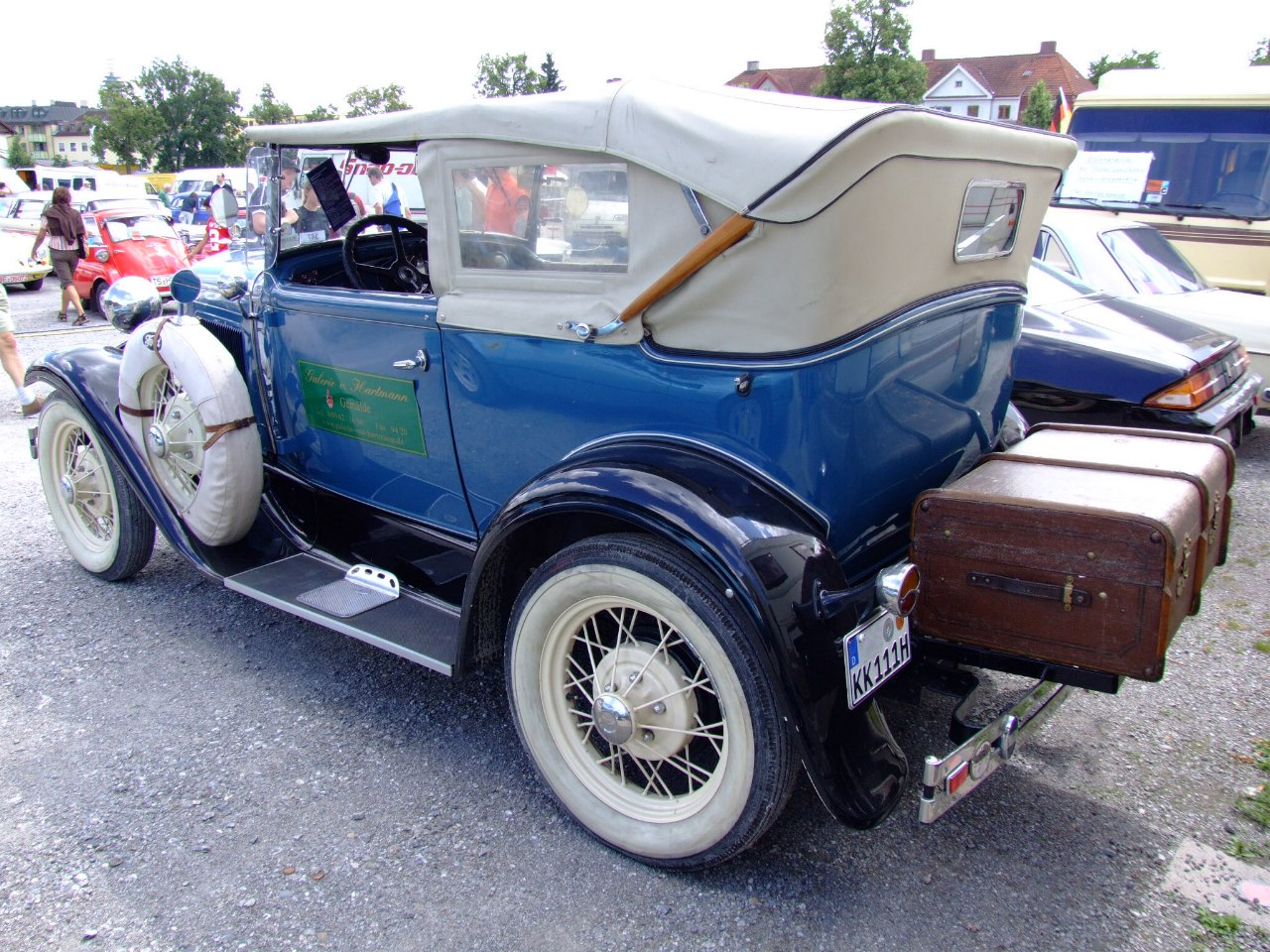
1930 Ford Model A

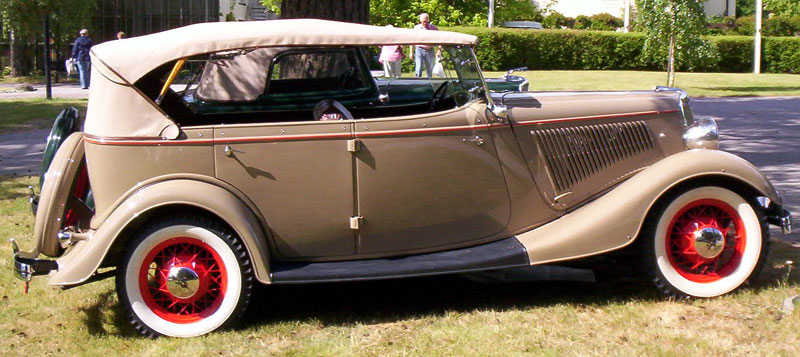
1934 Ford Model B

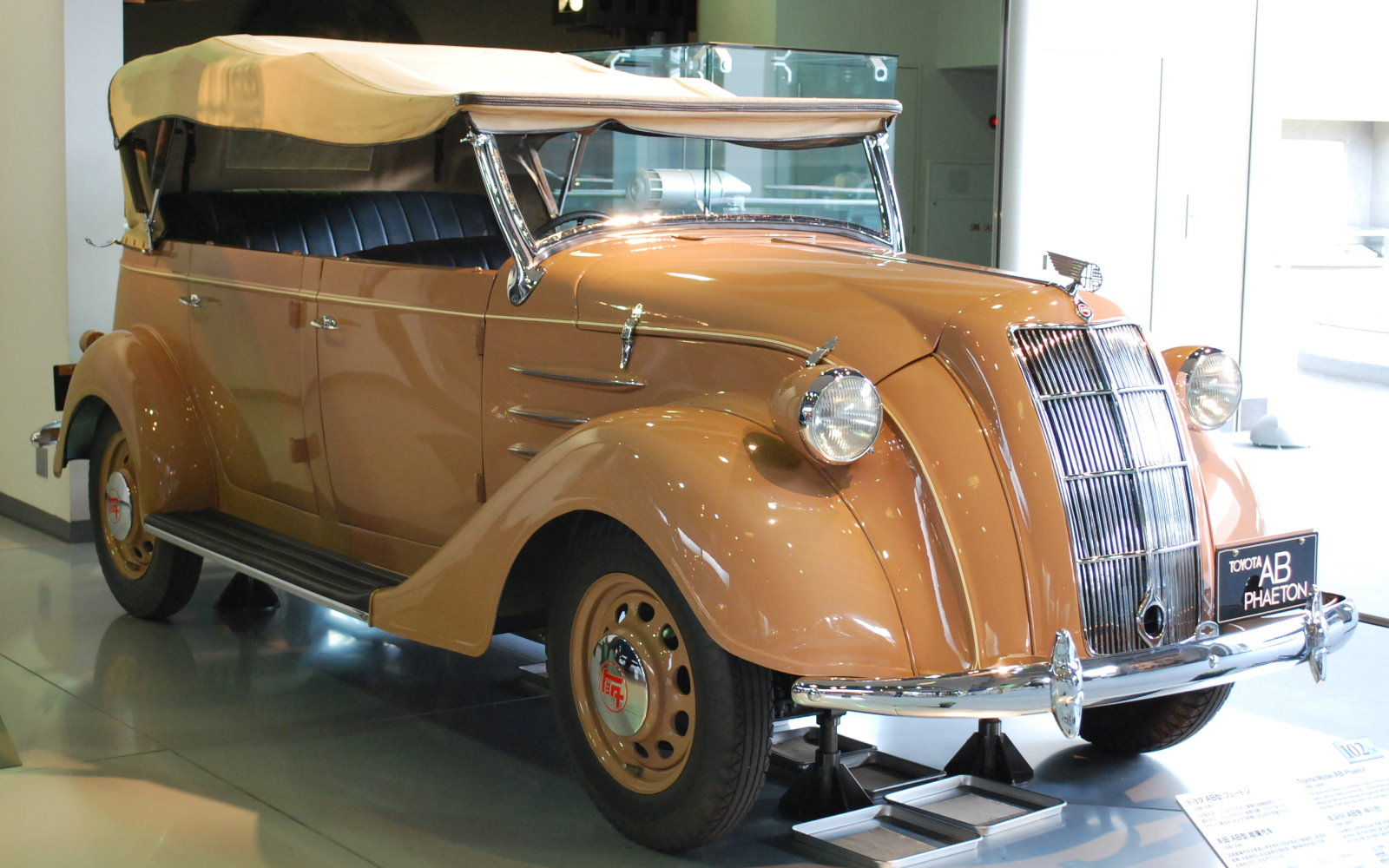
Toyota AB phaeton

== Doubles and triples ==
As roads improved and cars reached higher speeds, rear-seat passengers were exposed to more wind. An optional second windshield that attached behind the front seat offered some relief.

There were also double phaetons, with two rows of seats, triple phaetons, and closed phaetons.

After 1912, American use of the term became most closely associated with the "triple phaeton" body configurations that had room for three rows of seats, whether all three were installed or not. This also led to the term "phaeton" becoming similar to, and eventually interchangeable with, the term "touring car".

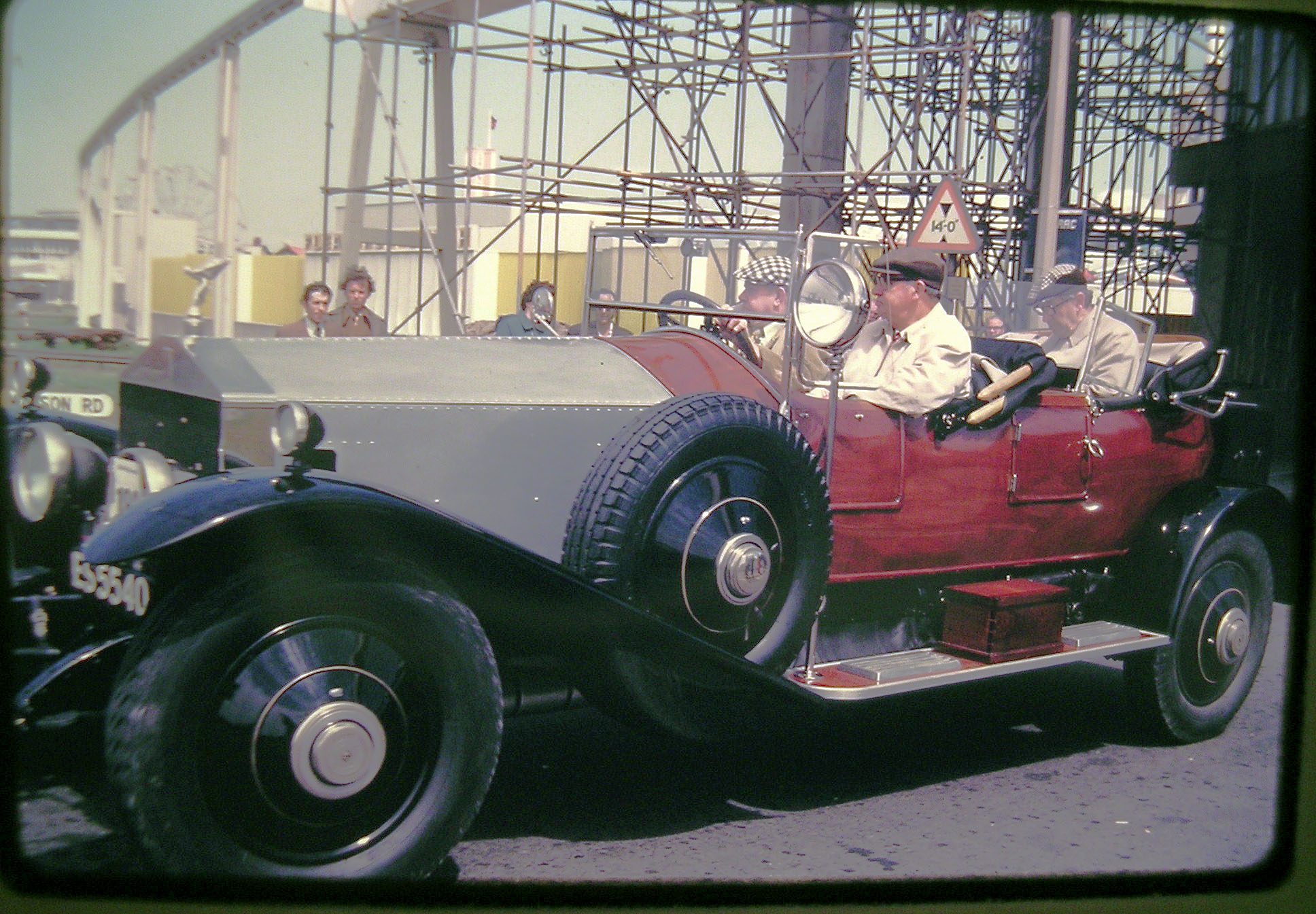
1924 Rolls-Royce 40/50

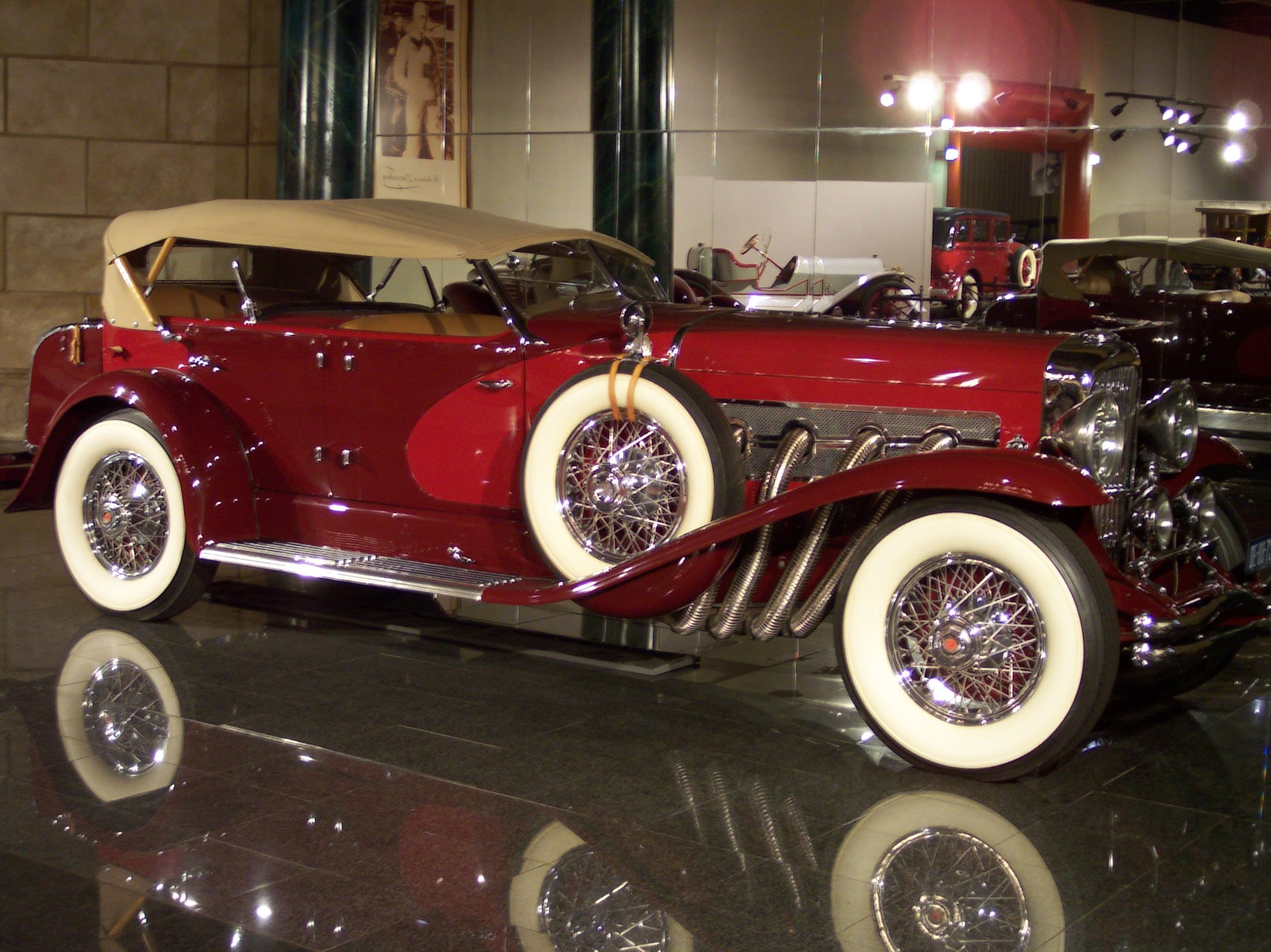
1935 Duesenberg

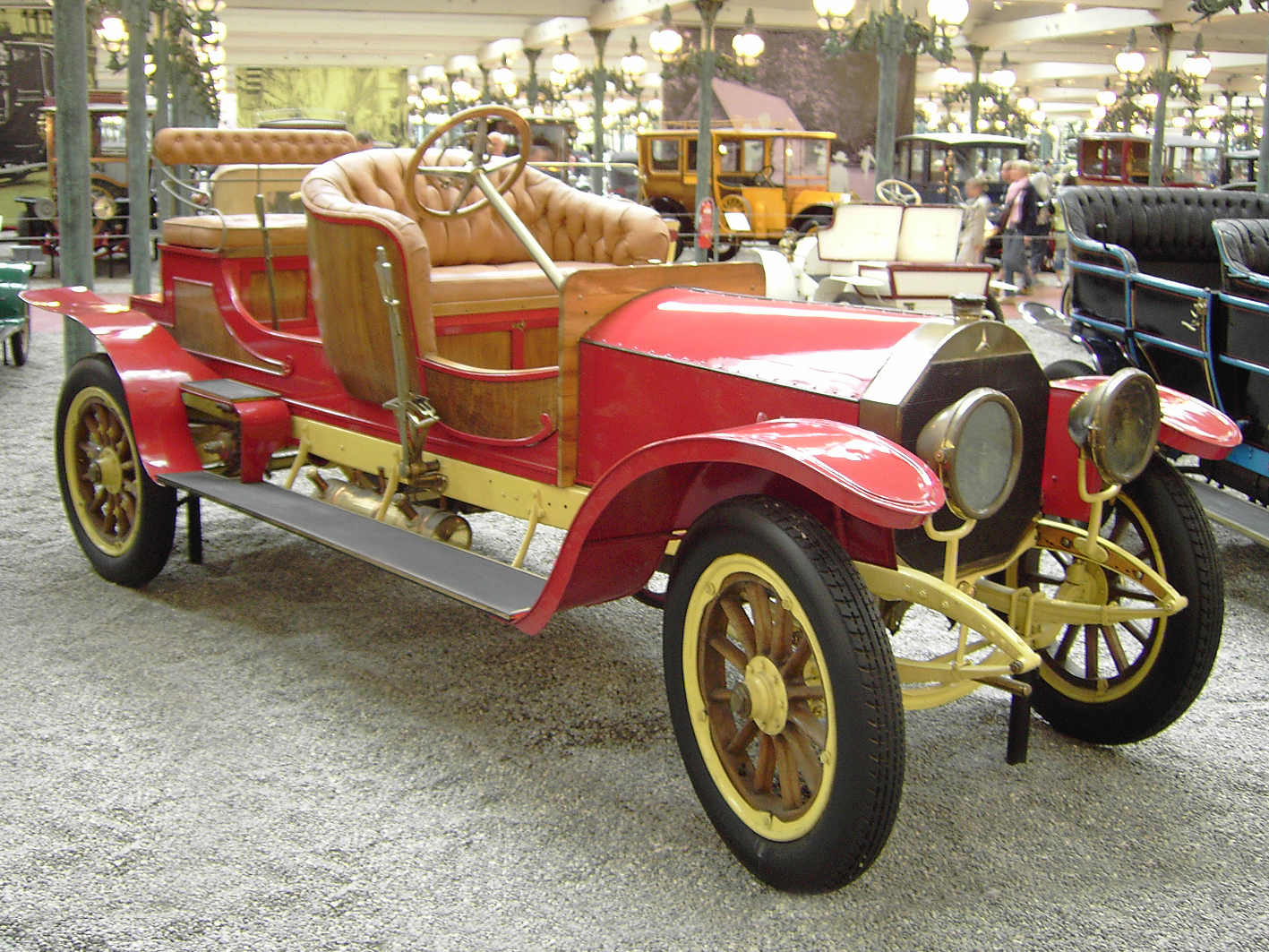
1905 Mercedes 28/50 PS double phaeton

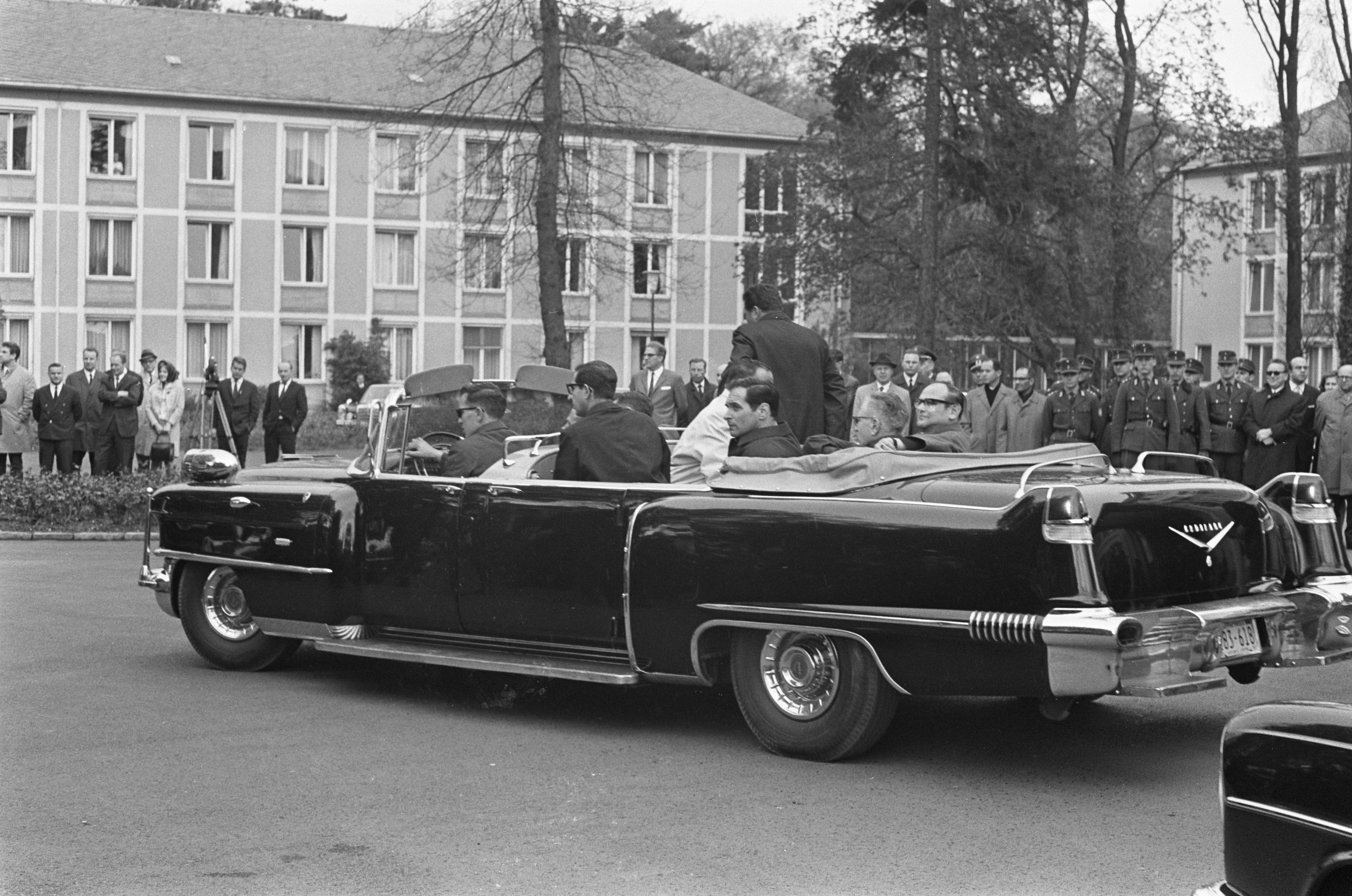
1956 Cadillac presidential parade car

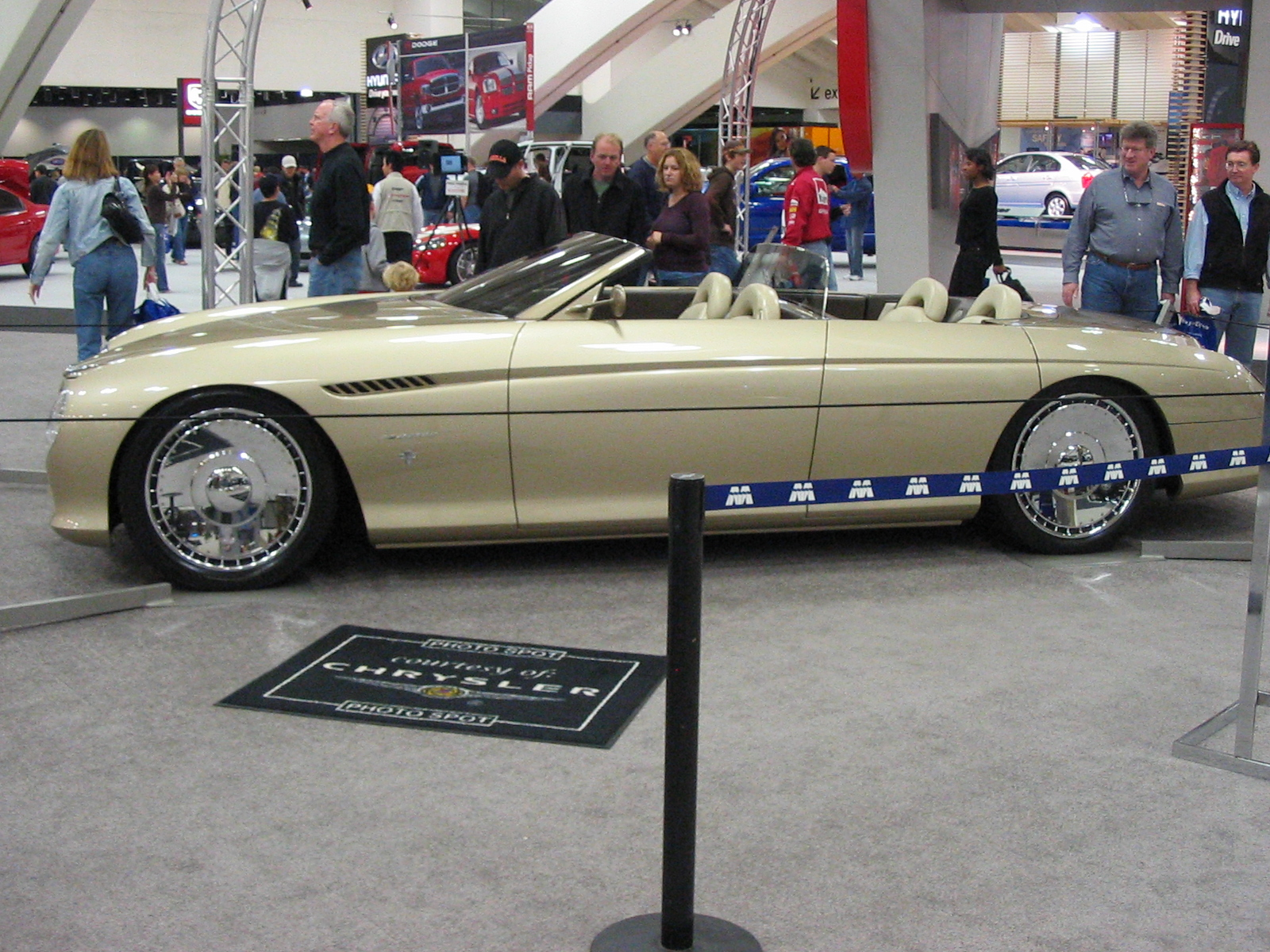
1997 Chrysler Phaeton concept car

=== Dual cowl phaeton ===
Specific use of the term phaeton is with the dual cowl phaeton, a body style in which the rear passengers were separated from the driver and the front passengers by a cowl or bulkhead, often with its own folding windshield.

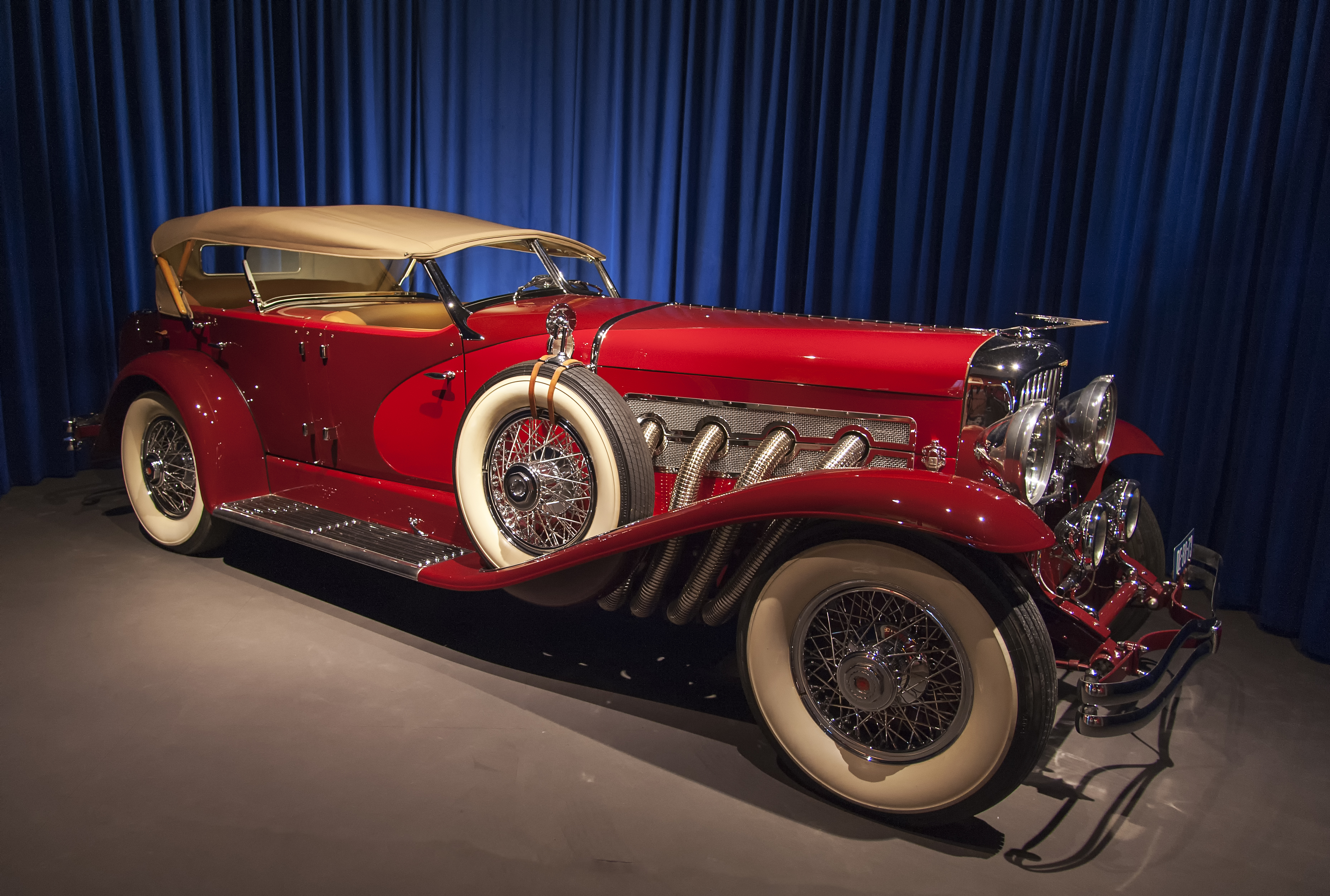
1935 Duesenberg Model SJ LaGrande Dual Cowl Phaeton

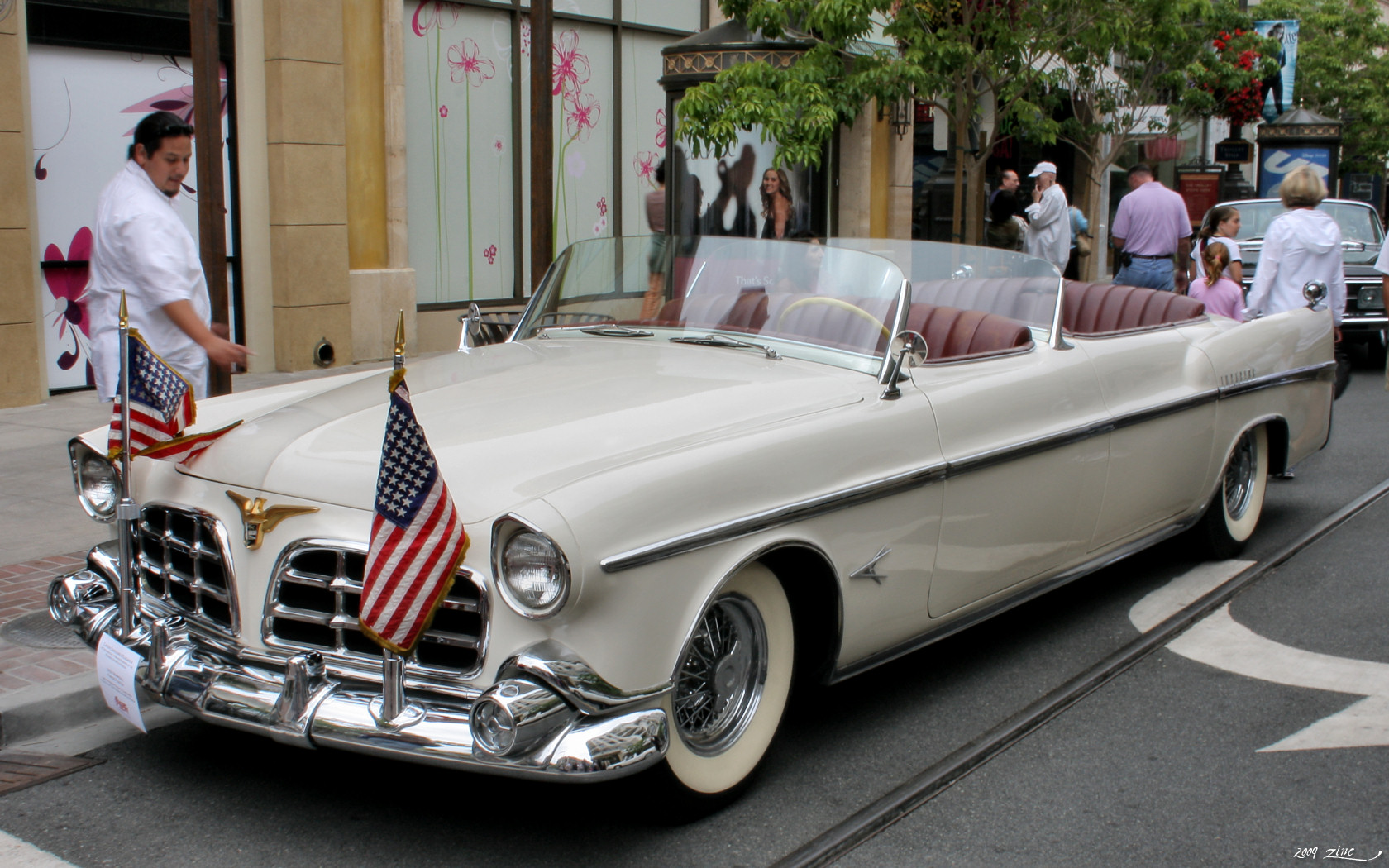
1956 Chrysler Imperial Parade Phaeton

== Decline in popularity ==
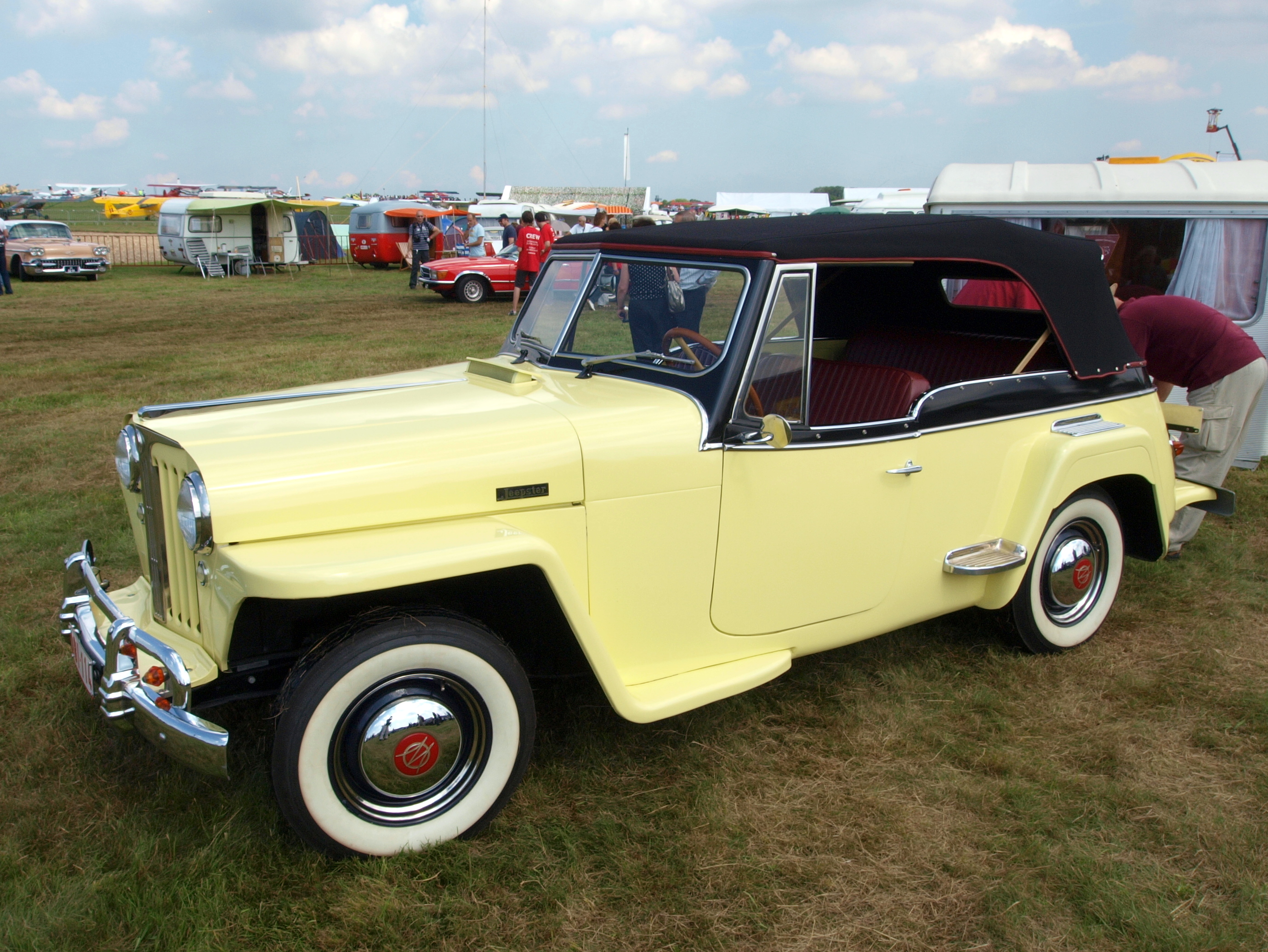
1948 Willys-Overland Jeepster, the last phaeton to be made by an American manufacturer

The phaeton and the touring car were popular up to the 1930s. They were largely replaced by the convertible, which also had a retractable roof, but also included side windows so that the car could be completely enclosed.

The Willys-Overland Jeepster was the last true phaeton produced by a major US automaker, and was introduced ten years after the previous phaeton to be offered by an American manufacturer. The post-World War II demand for automobiles - of any description - was an opportunity for Willys-Overland to build on the Jeep's military recognition and they evolved the 1946 Jeepster two-door station wagon to the 1948 phaeton. It provided "Spartan but adequate appointments" that included hinged front door vent windows and plastic side curtains rather than roll-up glass windows. Marketed from 1948 to 1951, the Jeepster phaeton was a rather expensive niche vehicle and "though admired by many, it was purchased by relatively few."

In 1952, a year after Willys last offered the Jeepster, Chrysler Corporation built three Imperial Parade phaetons for ceremonial use, one by New York City, one by Los Angeles, and one intended for the White House, but ultimately used for events throughout the United States. These were dual-cowl phaetons custom-built on stretched versions of the company’s Imperial Crown Limousine chassis.

== As a model name ==
From 1934 through 1941, Buick included a "convertible phaeton" body style, which was actually a four-door convertible, as the doors had roll-up windows in them and the car could be fully closed. The new for the 1934 model year convertible phaeton was the most expensive model after the limousine. These were "fancy named" four-door cars with two full-width bench seats allowing fully open air motoring weather permitting.

During the 1956 model year, Mercury marketed the four-door hardtop (no B-pillar) versions of its Montclair and Monterey models as "phaetons." The name for this four-door hardtop body style was an odd use since "phaeton" generally referred to vehicles lacking weather protection and previously described an open car. These low-silhouette cars featured a sloping roofline similar to that of Mercury's two-door hardtop models.

In 2002, Volkswagen introduced a vehicle with the name Phaeton, featuring a typical four-door sedan body style with A-, B-, and C-pillars as well as fully framed door windows. This phaeton-named design did not offer open-air motoring other than through an optional solar-powered glass sunroof panel.

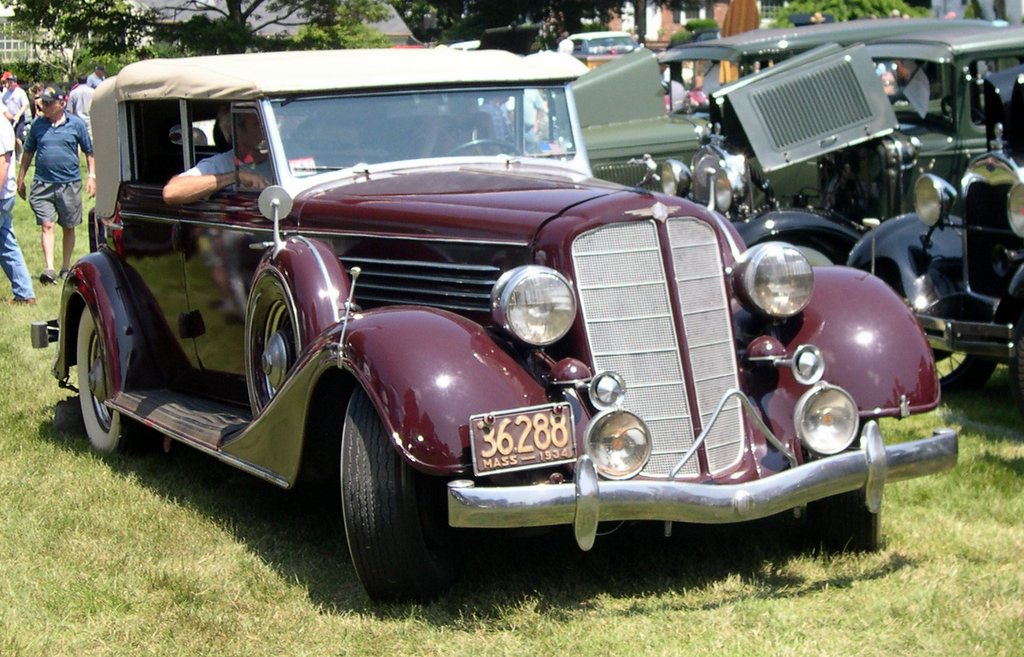
1934 Buick 4-door "convertible phaeton"

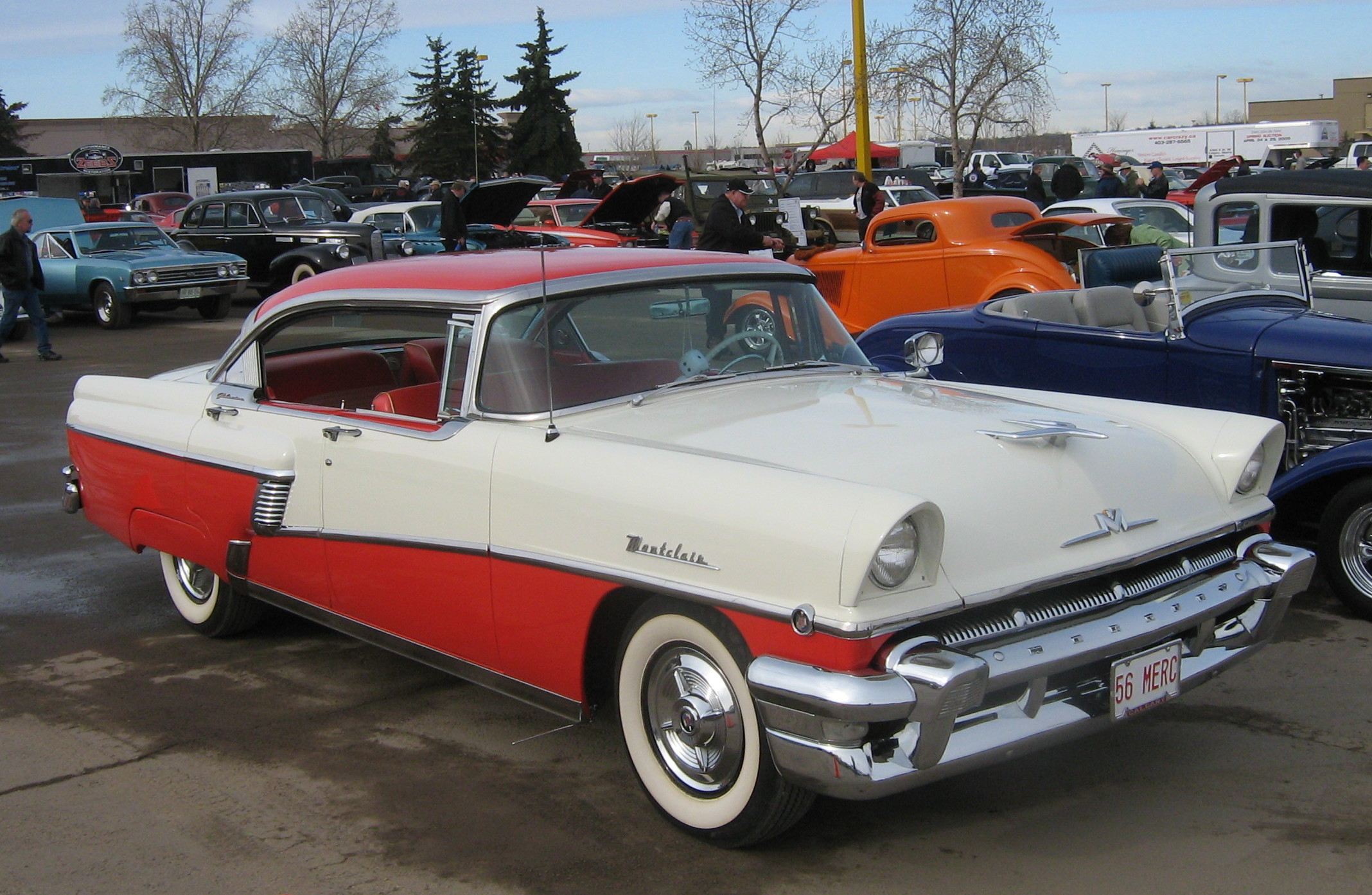
1956 Mercury Montclair Phaeton 4-door hardtop

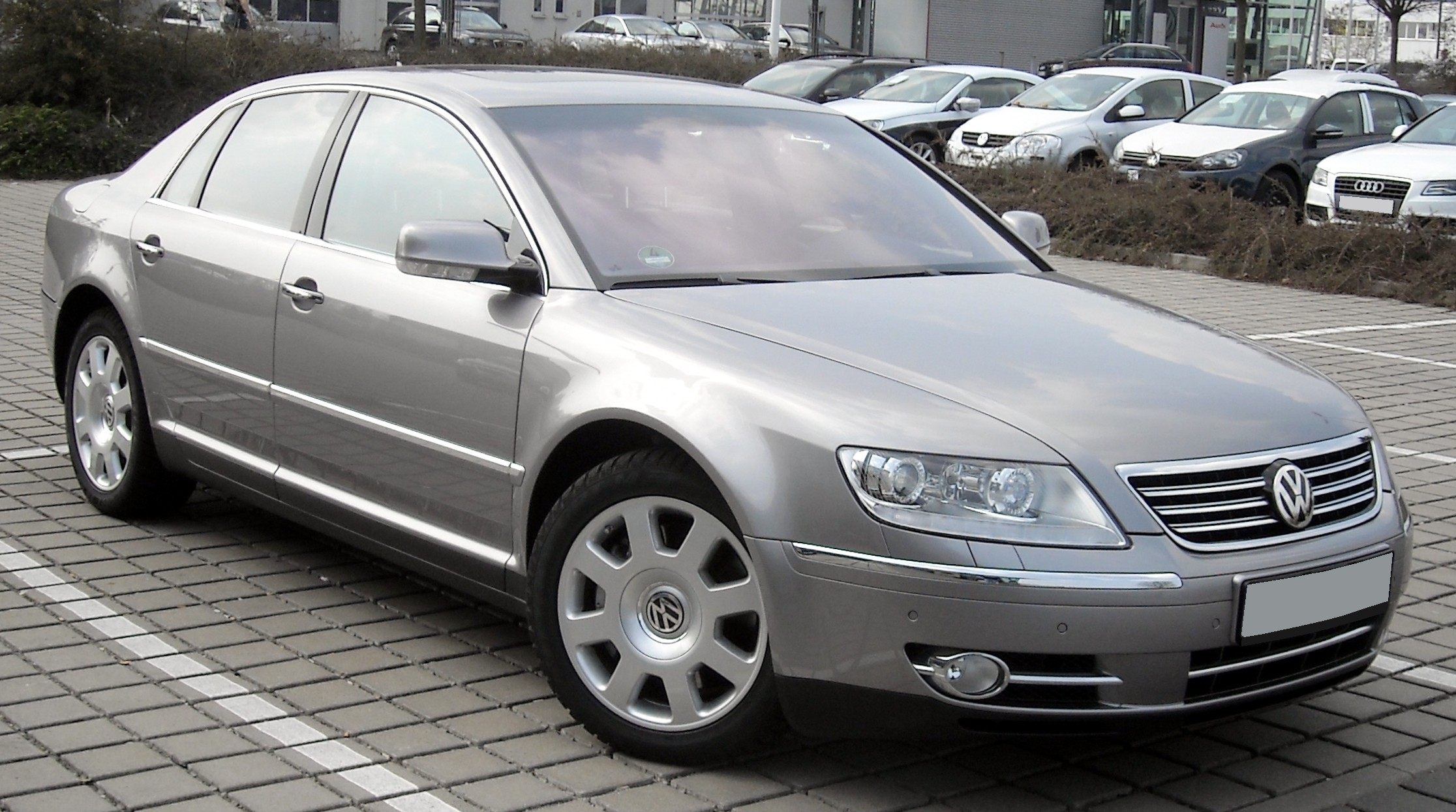
Volkswagen Phaeton 4-door sedan

== See also ==
- Brougham
- Coupé
- Grand tourer
- Roadster
- Runabout
