= Tom Gale (designer) =

American automobile designer (born 1943)

- Born: Thomas Charles Gale; June 18, 1943 (age 82)
- Education: Michigan State University
- Occupation: automobile designer
- Years active: 1967–2005
- Employer: Chrysler Corporation

Thomas Charles Gale (born 18 June 1943) is an American automobile designer widely known for his work with the Chrysler, Dodge and Plymouth marques.

== Early life and education ==
Gale was born in 1943 to Tom Gale Sr., who was an engineer in GM's Buick division. Growing up in Flint, Michigan, Gale showed a keen interest in automobiles. In 1966, he graduated from Michigan State with a degree in industrial design.

== Career ==
=== Time at Chrysler ===
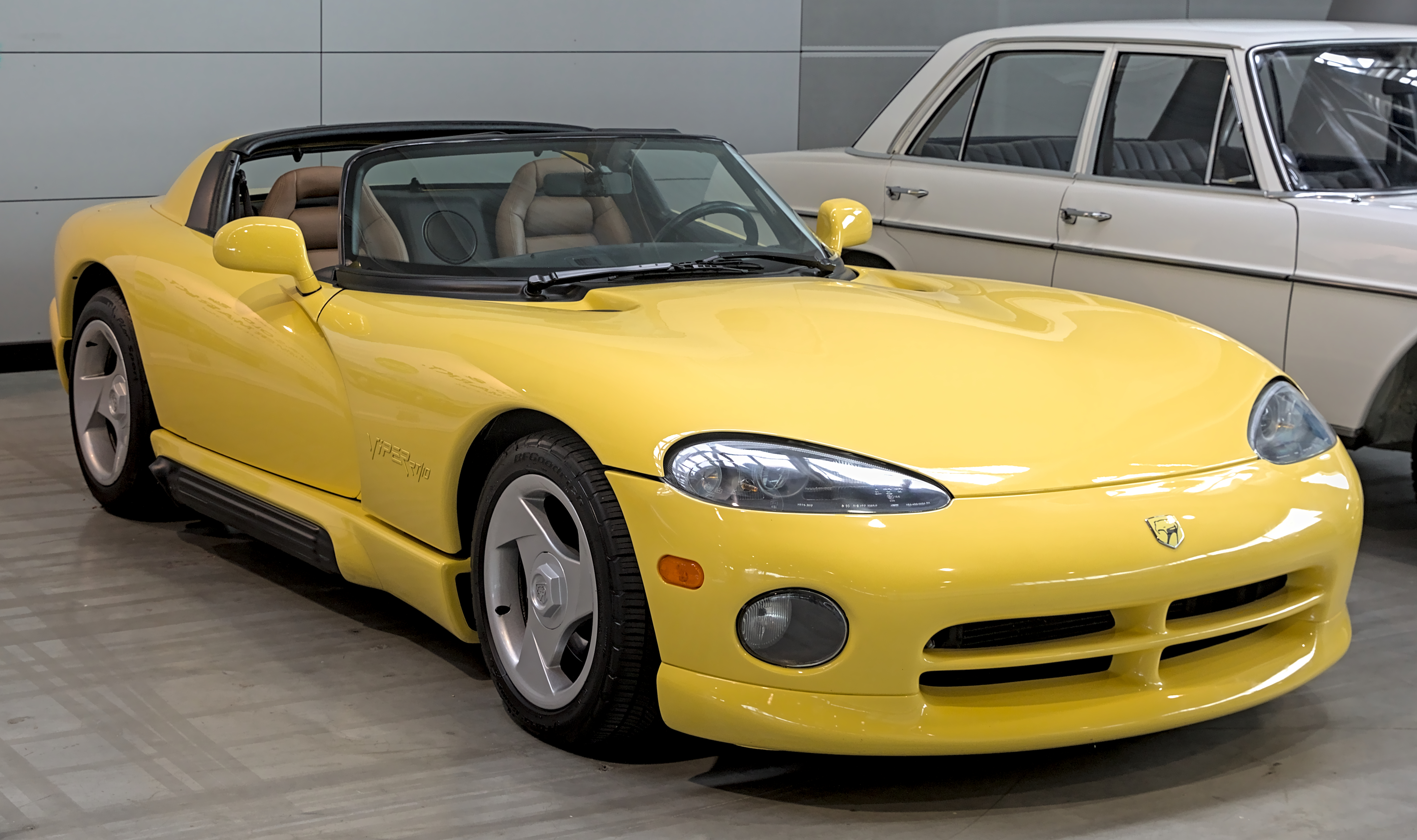
Dodge Viper RT/10

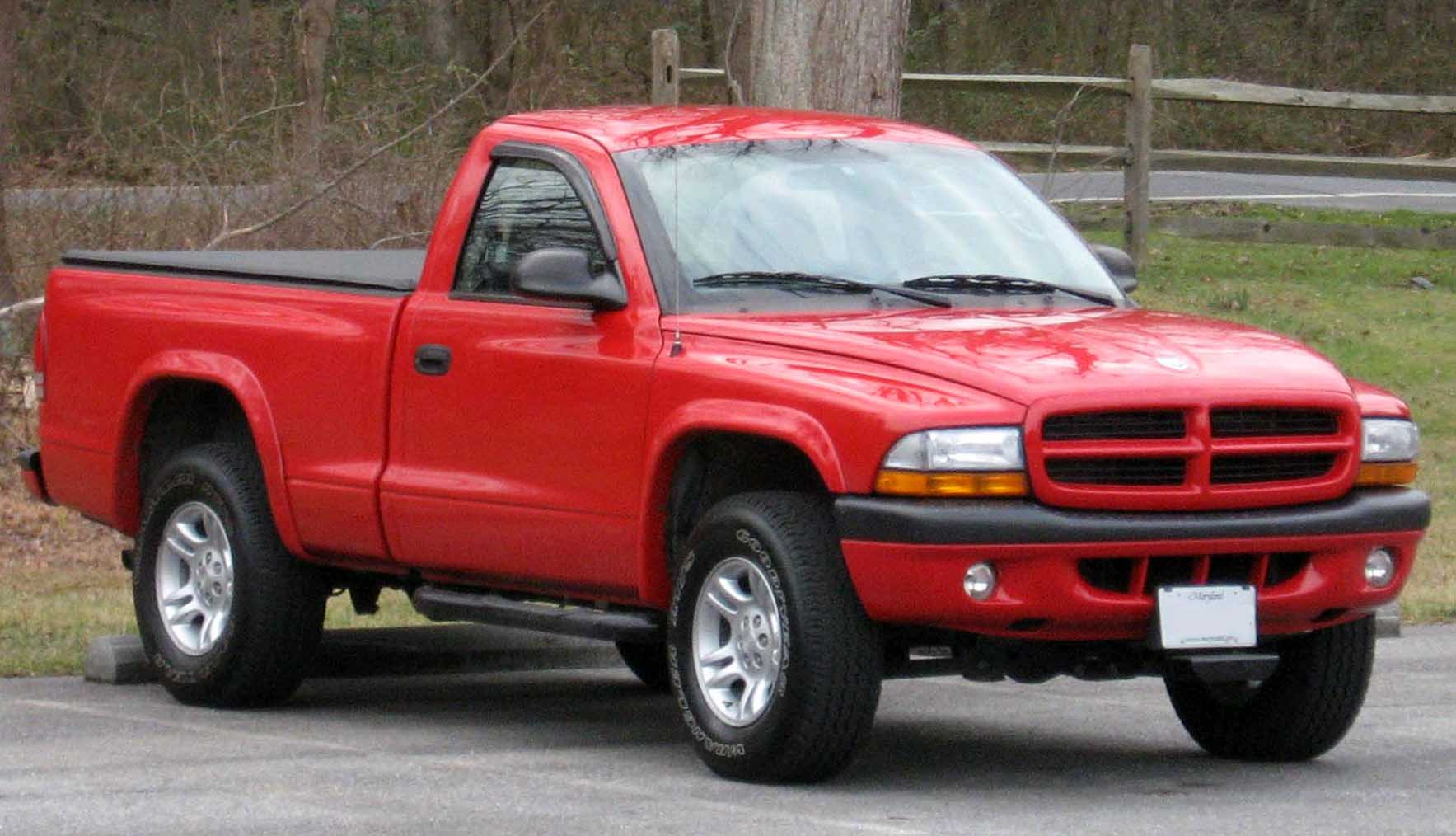
2nd generation Dodge Dakota

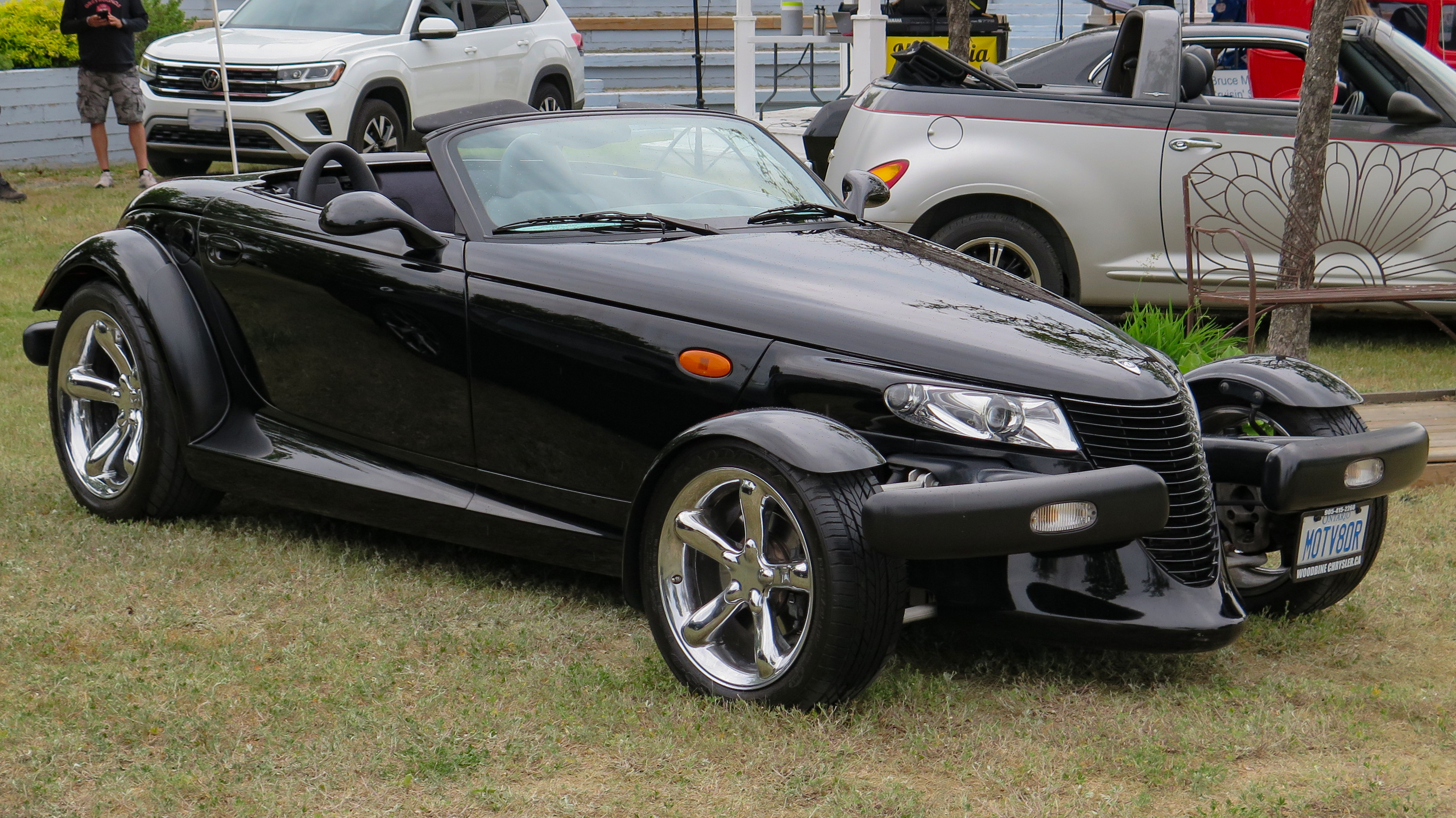
2000 Plymouth Prowler

Gale joined Chrysler as an industrial designer in 1967, working in the newly formed advanced body-engineering group. Later, he moved into the design department for Lee Iacocca's K-Car project. Gale was later promoted to head the Chrysler styling department, being involved in the designs of: the 1991 Dodge Stealth, the 1992 Dodge Viper, which evolved from the earlier concept without many changes, the swoopy Chrysler LH series models which were introduced in 1993, the 1994 Dodge Ram pickup series, the 1996 NS Minivans, and the 2001 Plymouth Prowler. He presented concept cars such as the 1993 Chrysler Thunderbolt, 1995 Atlantic, and 1997 Phaeton. While at Chrysler, he was also responsible for the final design of the Lamborghini Diablo. Designed into production form in 2000, the 2005 model year Chrysler 300C and 2005 Dodge Magnum exteriors were the final vehicles Gale designed for Chrysler before his retirement in December of that year.

=== Retirement and consultancy ===
Gale retired from Chrysler in December of 2000, after their merger with Daimler Benz, running a design consultancy that created a line of instruments for Classic Instruments Inc. He built Hot Rods, including a 1933 Ford highboy roadster with a Hemi V8.
