= Chrysler Atlantic =

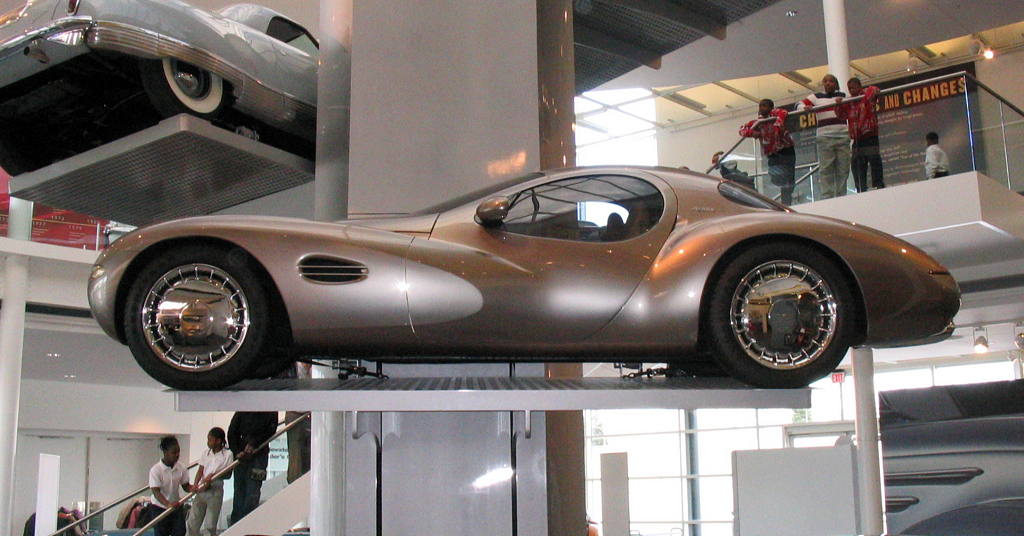
- Chrysler Atlantic at the Chrysler Museum

Overview
- Manufacturer: Chrysler
- Production: 1995
- Designer: Tom Gale; Bob Hubbach

Body and chassis
- Class: Concept car
- Layout: Front engine, rear-wheel drive
- Platform: modified Chrysler SR platform

Powertrain
- Engine: 4.0 L I8 based on 2x 2.0 L Chrysler Neon engines
- Transmission: 4-speed transaxle 42LE

Dimensions
- Wheelbase: 128 in (3251 mm)

The Chrysler Atlantic was a retro concept car created by Chrysler and fabricated by Gaffoglio Family Metalcrafters in California. It was first shown in 1995. The Atlantic was designed by Bob Hubbach and inspired by the Bugatti Atlantique. The idea for this car began as a sketch on a napkin by Chrysler's president Bob Lutz in early 1993 and also involved the automaker's chief designer, Tom Gale.

The Atlantic has several similarities to the opulent vehicles of the 1930s such as the aforementioned Bugatti Type 57S Atlantique (or Atlantic). Its styling is also more than a little inspired by the Talbot-Lago T150 SS Coupe that was constructed in 1938, such as the shape of the side windows and the curved boot. Some of the retro details include a straight-8-engine that was actually constructed from two 4-cylinder Dodge Neon engines with an S configuration 4.0 L., which is rarely used in modern cars. Other retro touches to the car's look include the interior that is replete with Art Deco-style gauges. The Atlantic Concept has around 360 horsepower (268.5 kW) and uses Chrysler's 42LE transaxle transmission lifted from the Chrysler LHS mounted to the rear subframe. Power is sent from the engine to the transaxle through a long torque tube hidden under a large tunnel in the interior. Riding on a 128-inch (3,251 mm) wheelbase, its front wheels measure 21 inches and 22 inches in the rear — large at that time.

It was one of Chrysler's most popular concept vehicles and has proven popular enough to still make the occasional public appearance.

The Atlantic's popularity has also allowed its overall design and image to be associated as part of both advertising and labeling of packages associated with a variety of automotive car care products, accessories, and electronics.
