= Fiat Tipo (2015) =

Compact car and three-box sedan

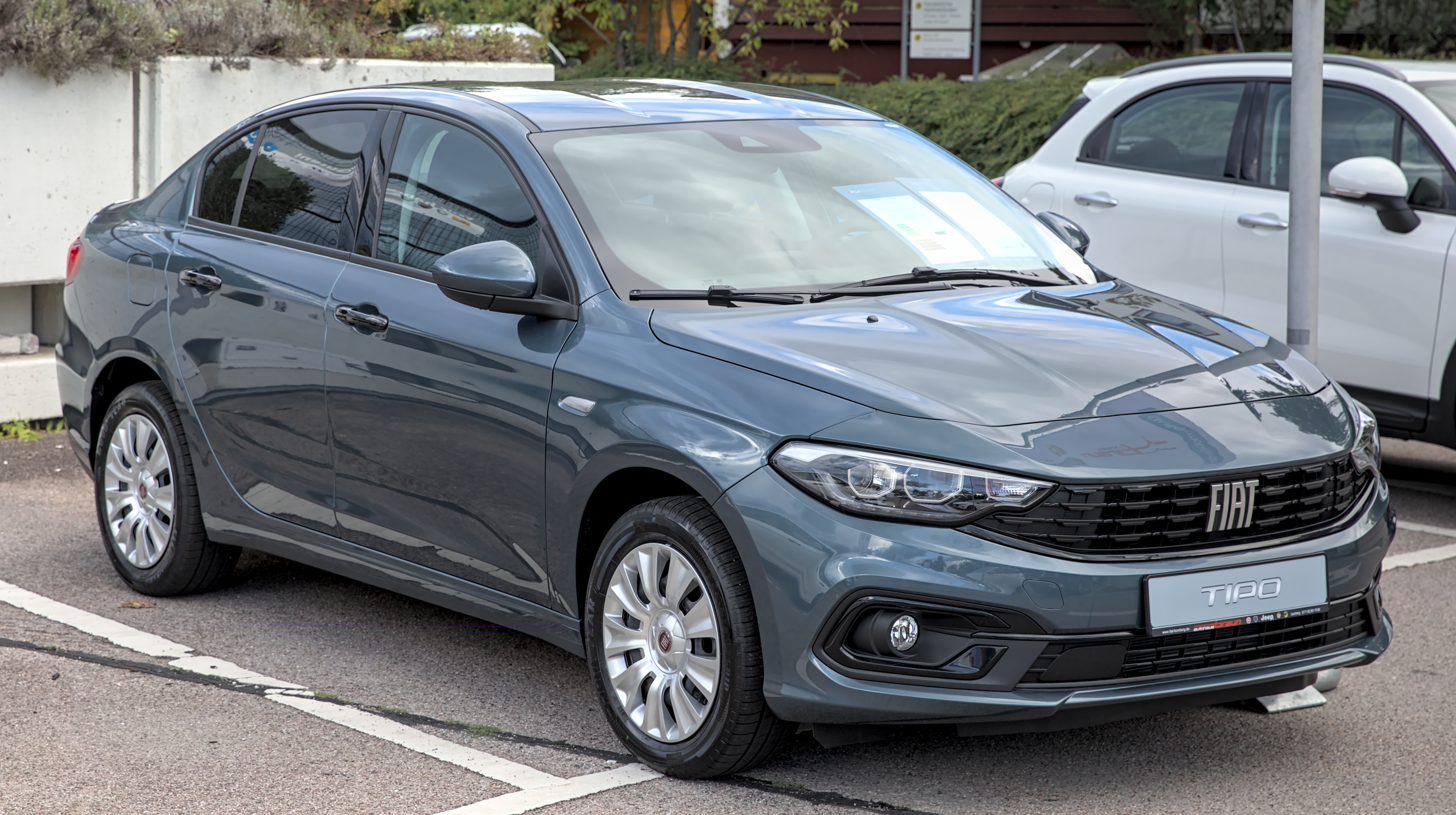
- 2022 Fiat Tipo sedan (facelift)

Overview
- Manufacturer: Fiat (Note: FCA Italy (2015–2023); Stellantis Europe (2023–2026))
- Also called: Fiat Egea (Turkey); Dodge Neon (Mexico & Middle East)
- Production: 2015–2026; 1,417,047 built
- Assembly: Turkey: Bursa (Tofaş)
- Designer: Roberto Giolito at Centro Stile Fiat

Body and chassis
- Class: Compact car (C)
- Body style: 4-door sedan 5-door hatchback 5-door cross hatchback 5-door station wagon 5-door cross station wagon
- Layout: Front-engine, front-wheel-drive
- Platform: FCA Small Wide
- Related: Fiat 500L; Fiat 500X; Jeep Renegade; Jeep Compass

Powertrain
- Engine: Petrol: 1.0 L FireFly turbo I3; 1.4 L FIRE I4; 1.4 L T-Jet I4; 1.6 L E.torQ I4; Petrol/LPG: 1.4 L T-Jet I4; Petrol/flexfuel: 1.6 L E.torQ I4; Petrol Hybrid: 1.5 L FireFly turbo I4; Diesel: 1.3 L Multijet I4; 1.6 L Multijet I4
- Transmission: 5-speed FPT C510 manual; 6-speed FPT C635 manual; 6-speed FPT C635 dual-clutch automatic; 6-speed Aisin AW60T automatic

Dimensions
- Wheelbase: 2,638 mm (103.9 in)
- Length: Sedan: 4,532 mm (178.4 in); Hatchback: 4,368 mm (172.0 in); Cross: 4,368 mm (172.0 in); Station Wagon: 4,571 mm (180.0 in); Cross: 4,571 mm (180.0 in)
- Width: 1,792 mm (70.6 in)
- Height: Sedan: 1,497 mm (58.9 in); Hatchback: 1,495 mm (58.9 in); Station Wagon: 1,514 mm (59.6 in)
- Curb weight: Sedan: 1,150–1,270 kg (2,535–2,800 lb); Hatchback: 1,195–1,295 kg (2,635–2,855 lb); Station Wagon: 1,305–1,350 kg (2,877–2,976 lb)

Chronology
- Predecessor: Fiat Bravo (for hatchback); Fiat Linea (for sedan); Fiat Stilo MultiWagon (for station wagon)

The Fiat Tipo (codeproject Type 356, also known as the Fiat Egea (stylized as ÆGEA) in Turkey and Dodge Neon in Mexico and the Middle East) is a compact car produced by Fiat from 2015 to 2026. It was available in saloon, hatchback and station wagon versions.

== History: the Ægea project ==
The development of the Tipo family began in 2014 when Fiat announced the Ægea project (Type 356). Specifically, the Italian manufacturer was building a family of C-segment cars to be marketed in Europe, the Middle East and Africa (EMEA) to replace both the old Fiat Bravo hatchback and the Linea sedan. The production site chosen was the Turkish Bursa plant (owned by Fiat and Tofaş), which already produced the previous Linea. Alfredo Altavilla, at the time director of the EMEA area of the FCA Italy group, and Olivier François, director of Fiat brand, declared that the Ægea family had been built according to the Fiat "Rational" range (including Panda, Punto, Fiorino and Doblò) vehicles characterized by functional solution, low running costs, spacious interior and low price list.

The first version to be presented was the three-volume saloon at the Istanbul Motor Show in May 2015; called Fiat Egea, the car went into production in October–November of the same year, replacing the Linea in the Fiat range of products in Turkey. The name Egea is used only on the Turkish market because the term is very well known among the Turkish population as it identifies both the Aegean Sea that bathes the coasts of Turkey and the ancient medieval town of Yumurtalık. In October 2015 Alfredo Altavilla announced that the official name of the cars for the European market would be Fiat Tipo, taking the historical name of the Fiat model of the 80s known for its spacious interior and low running costs. Fiat and Tofaş have invested a total of 1.5 billion dollars for the development and production of the Tipo.

=== Further development ===
The Tipo was assembled at the Tofaş plant in Bursa, Turkey, by the Italian automaker Fiat and is built on the Fiat Small Wide LWB platform. It replaced the Bravo and Linea in the small family car range. The Tipo was designed by Centro Stile Fiat in Mirafiori, Turin. In December 2015, the car won the 2016 Best Buy Car of Europe Award, from the Autobest jury made up of Europe's twenty-six leading journalists, from twenty-six different European countries. In 2016, the saloon was followed by a hatchback and a station wagon version for the European market.

In February 2019, the 500,000th Fiat Tipo was produced at the Bursa plant, in Turkey. At the end of October 2020 (28th), a total of 670,000 units of Fiat Tipo had been produced and distributed in over 40 countries around the world. In 2021, Fiat introduced a facelift to the Tipo with a new motor, new levels of security, technology and a new Cross version. The new change of this facelift introduced the new gasoline engines of the Global Small Engine (FireFly) family produced by FCA Poland Powertrain in Bielsko-Biała in only one version: 1.0 L Turbo 3-cylinder 120 hp with direct injection, Multiair system and GPF filter, the 1.0 L is available with a 5-speed manual transmission and front-wheel drive, this new motor is for the models Jeep Renegade, Fiat 500X and Fiat Tipo (2015).

In March 2022, the new 1.5-liter GSE (Global Small Engine) T4, four-cylinder, 130 HP and 240 Nm of torque, also from the FireFly family, was introduced in Italy, Europe, Turkey and in the United Arab Emirates (like the previous 1.0 T3), Turbo petrol but with hybrid technology, combined with a 48V electric motor that integrates a small additional 15 kW unit, the latter installed in the new seven-speed dual-clutch DCT automatic transmission, capable of allowing a more silent start (100% electric) and to use the car in fully electric mode (e-launch), in parking maneuvers or in small forward movements at walking pace (e-queuing), such as when in queue in city traffic. This hybrid technology represented a step forward for Fiat, improving the efficiency and dynamics of the vehicle and allowing it to travel with the thermal engine switched off.

The petrol engine, in fact, thanks to the electric one, can remain inactive up to 47% of the time. For this reason, the new 130 bhp 1.5-liter GSE T4 e-motor has been defined by experts in the field of automotive (not a mild-hybrid, introduced on the Fiat Panda and Fiat 500 only, but) a mini Full-hybrid or Middle-hybrid, (i.e. a via between a full-hybrid and a mild-hybrid), according to the hybrid cars of other brands such as Toyota, which was the first to introduce this technology in the automotive market. This new advanced hybrid engine, developed by the engineers of the FCA Group (also introduced on the new Alfa Romeo Tonale, on the Fiat 500X hybrid, as well as on the Jeep Renegade and Compass models), also allows an 11% reduction in CO_{2} compared to the previous version, with declared consumption, for the new Fiat Tipo hybrid, of just 4.7 l/ 100 km. In November 2022, the 1 millionth Tipo was produced at Bursa plant.

== Overview ==
=== Design ===
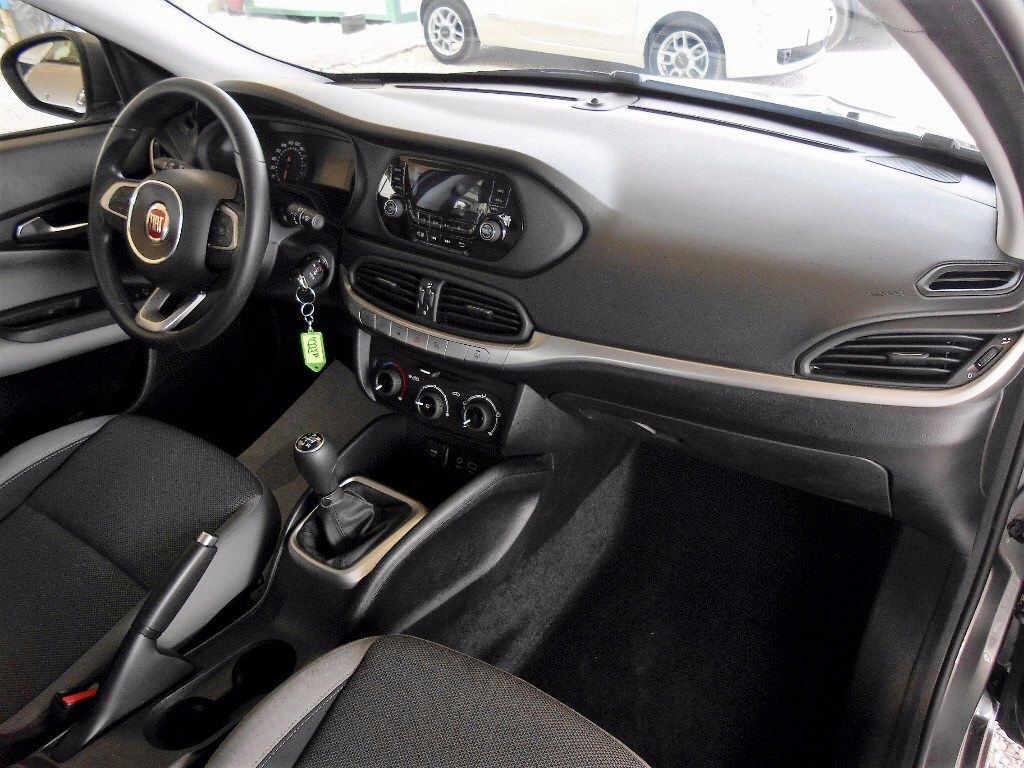
Interior of basic trim with standard radio or UConnect 5-inch

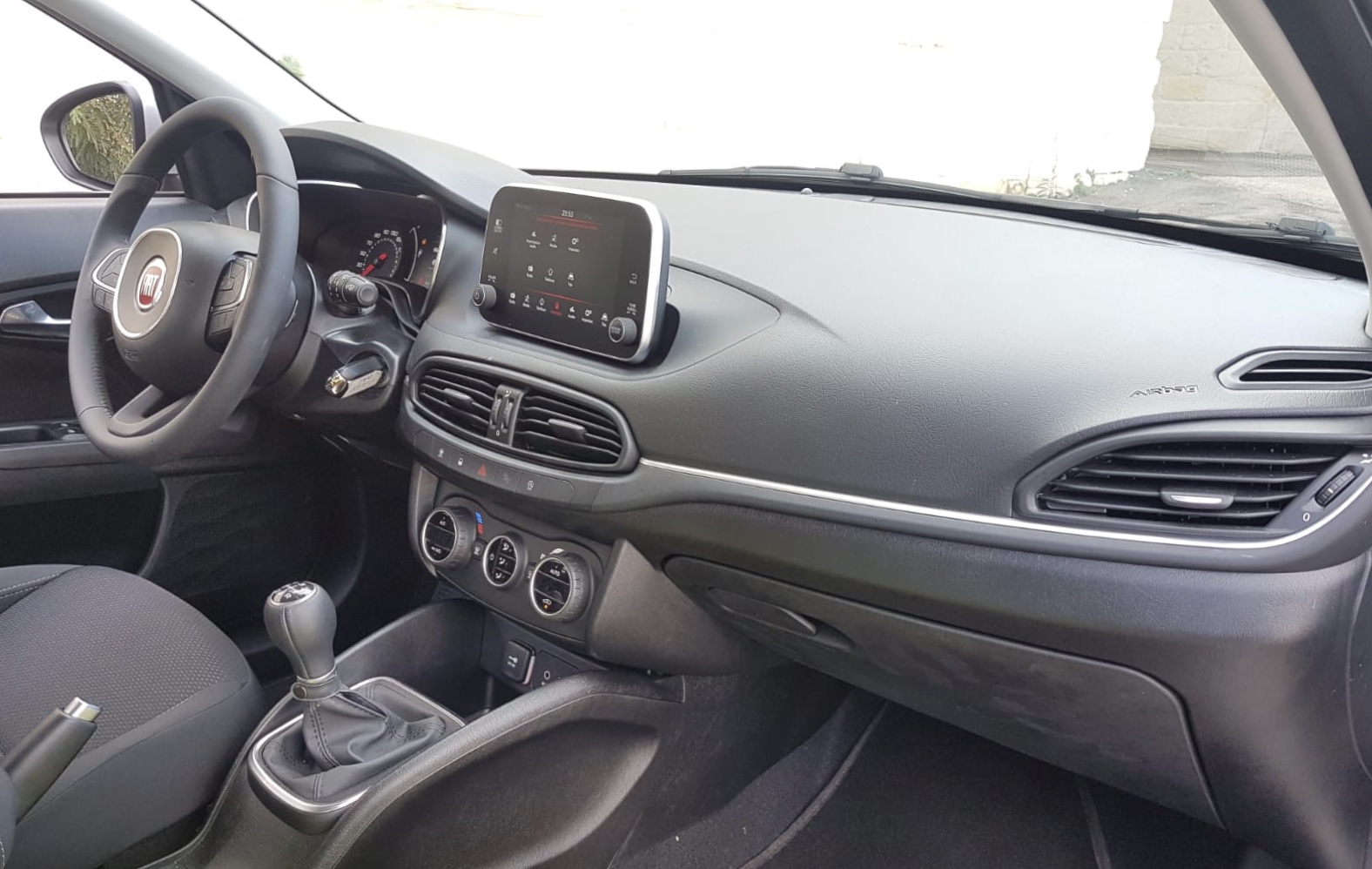
Interior of top trim with UConnect HD 7-inch

The Fiat Tipo design was created by the Centro Stile Fiat located in the Officina 83 of the Fiat Mirafiori Plant. The style team was led by Alberto Dilillo and Roberto Giolito. Compared to the previous Linea and Bravo, the Tipo is designed first in the three-volume sedan form independent from the remaining two versions so as to create a more harmonious and elegant body. Alberto Dilillo declares that the inspiration of the designers for the front comes directly from the Maserati models with the headlights connected to the grille and the air intakes with three-dimensional chrome elements. The front has a lower shape and developed horizontally, while the previous Linea and Bravo had a much more inclined snout and connected with the windshield. In the rear, the trunk lid has a shape that simulates a spoiler. The hatchback and station wagon versions have the same front, the hatchback also inherits the same side of the four-door sedan including the doors, the station wagon instead has specific rear doors.

The Fiat Tipo sedan is 4532 mm long, 1497 mm tall and 1792 mm wide with a wheelbase of 2638 mm and a five-seat passenger compartment with a 520-litre trunk. The hatchback has the same wheelbase but the bodywork is 4368 mm long, 1495 mm tall and 1792 mm wide. The trunk has a capacity of 440 litres. The station wagon (estate) is 4571 mm long, 1792 mm wide and 1514 mm tall and has the same wheelbase as the sedan and hatchback versions. The minimum luggage capacity is 550 litres.

The interior of the Tipo has two different dashboards depending on the trim level. The base models have the upper part that integrates the radio or the Uconnect 5-inch infotainment system connected to the instrumentation, while the top models have the upper part with the tablet-style 7-inch Uconnect HD infotainment system. The lower part of the dashboard is identical for all versions and is inherited from the Fiat Punto (199). The right-hand drive models have a single dashboard for all trim levels, the same as the LHD models in the basic version with the upper dashboard connected to the instrumentation and which integrates the various 5-inch and 7-inch Uconnect infotainment systems.

=== Chassis ===
The base chassis is the front-wheel drive Small Wide modular platform with a long wheelbase, an enlarged and extended version of the Small platform. The front suspension use a McPherson structure with telescopic shock absorbers and rear suspension use a torsion beam and telescopic shock absorbers. The same Small Wide platform is used by many Fiat Chrysler Automobiles group cars such as the Fiat 500L, Fiat 500X, Jeep Renegade, Fiat Toro etc. Production takes place at the Bursa plant in Turkey, which already produced the Fiat Linea, also based on the previous Small platform.

=== Engines ===
Model	Year	Engine	Fuel	Transmission	Power	Torque	Emissions CO_{2}
FireFly 1.0 T3 GSE MultiAir3	2021–2026	999 cc I3	petrol turbo	5-speed manual	100 PS (74 kW; 99 hp) at 5,750 rpm	190 N⋅m (140 lb⋅ft) at 1,750 rpm	124 g/km
1.4 16V FIRE	2015–2026	1368 cc I4	Petrol	6-speed manual	95 PS (70 kW; 94 hp) at 6,000 rpm	127 N⋅m (94 lb⋅ft) at 4,500 rpm	133 g/km
1.4 16V T-Jet EasyPower	2016–2020	1368 cc I4	Petrol and LPG, turbo	6-speed manual	120 PS (88 kW; 118 hp) at 5,000 rpm	215 N⋅m (159 lb⋅ft) at 2,500 rpm	140 g/km
1.6 16V E.torQ	2016–2020	1598 cc I4	Petrol and Bioethanol	6-speed automatic	110 PS (81 kW; 108 hp) at 5,500 rpm	152 N⋅m (112 lb⋅ft) at 4,500 rpm	146 g/km
FireFly 1.5 T4 GSE - mild-hybrid 48V engine (e-motor in the automatic transmission)	March 2022–2026	1468 cc I4	petrol/electric turbo (mini Full-hybrid)	7-speed Automatic DCT	130 + 20 PS (96 + 15 kW; 128 + 20 hp)	240 N⋅m (177 lb⋅ft) at 1,500	107 g/km
1.3 16V MultiJet II	2015–2026	1248 cc I4	Turbodiesel	5-speed manual	95 PS (70 kW; 94 hp)	200 N⋅m (148 lb⋅ft)	110 g/km
1.6 16V MultiJet II	2015–2026	1598 cc I4	Turbodiesel	6-speed manual	130 PS (96 kW; 128 hp)	320 N⋅m (236 lb⋅ft) at 1,500 rpm	115 g/km

== Safety ==
The test for Euro NCAP was changed for 2016, so that every car would be tested with standard equipment and additionally with "safety pack" if safety equipment is considered as optional extra. The Tipo had only three stars in the Euro NCAP test with standard equipment, and four stars with speed limiter and brake assistance.

Euro NCAP test results* Standard (2016)
Test	Points	%
Overall:	3 /5 stars	
Adult occupant:	31.3	82%
Child occupant:	29.8	60%
Pedestrian:	26.2	62%
Safety assist:	3	25%

Euro NCAP test results* Safety Pack (2016)
Test	Points	%
Overall:	4 /5 stars	
Adult occupant:	31.3	82%
Child occupant:	29.8	60%
Pedestrian:	26.2	62%
Safety assist:	6.9	57%

=== The Tipo in the European market ===
In November 2015 sales of the Fiat Tipo sedan started in Italy, Spain and France. The 5-door hatchback and station wagon versions were presented at the Geneva Motor Show in March 2016. In 2016 the Tipo is officially on sale in all three of its variants throughout Europe, to the exception of the United Kingdom where the sedan is not imported due to the low demand for this type of vehicle. At the debut the engine range consisted of the 1.4 Fire 16V petrol delivering 95 hp, the 1.6 E.torQ 16V with 110 hp, the 1.3 Multijet II 16V diesel with 95 hp and 1.6 Multijet II diesel with 120 hp.

In 2017 the Tipo range was enlarged with the introduction of the two-seater Van variant of the station wagon, available in southern Europe. Also in 2017, dual-fuel variants (called EasyPower) were introduced, powered by petrol and LPG.

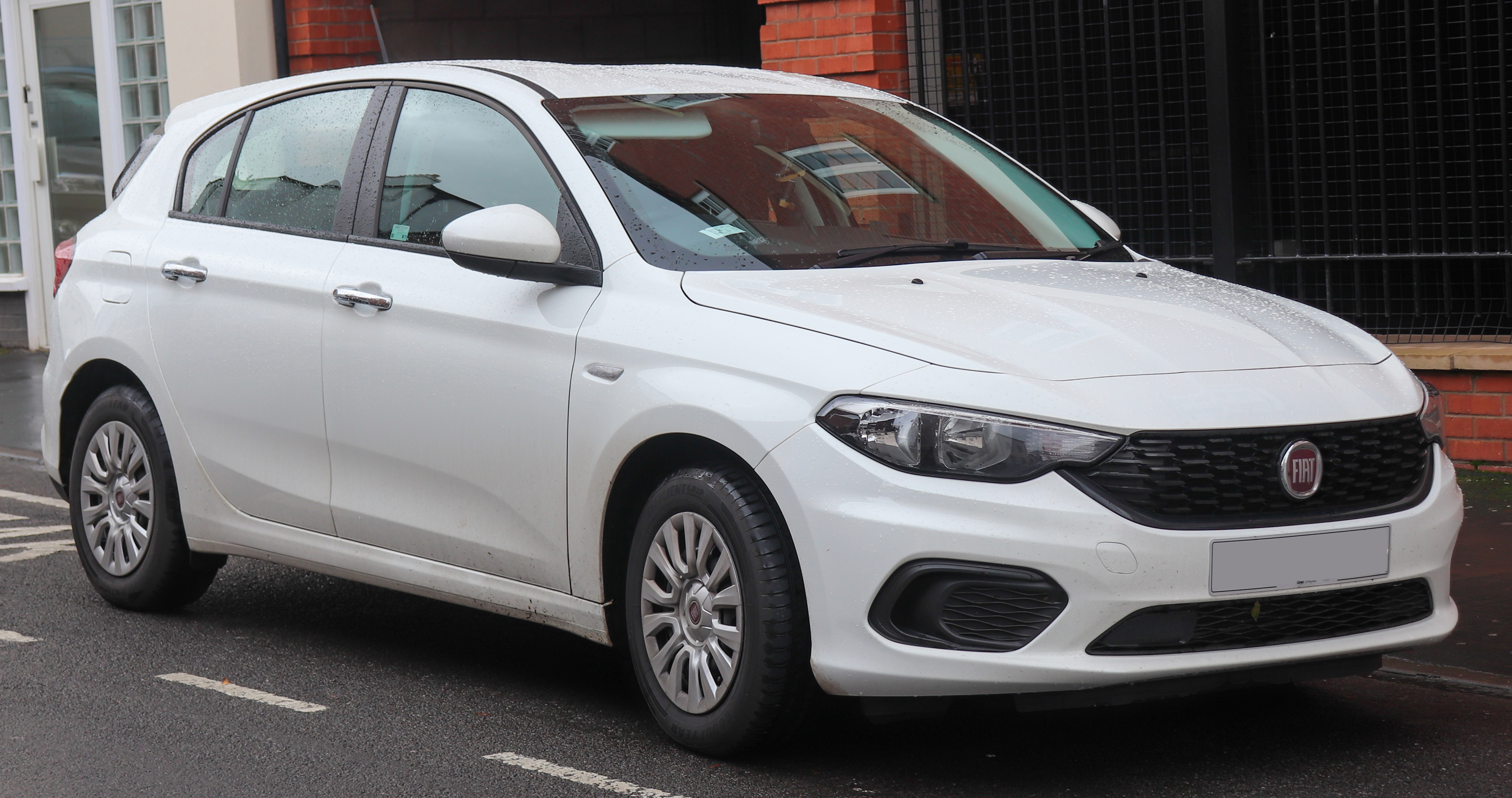
Hatchback (pre-facelift)

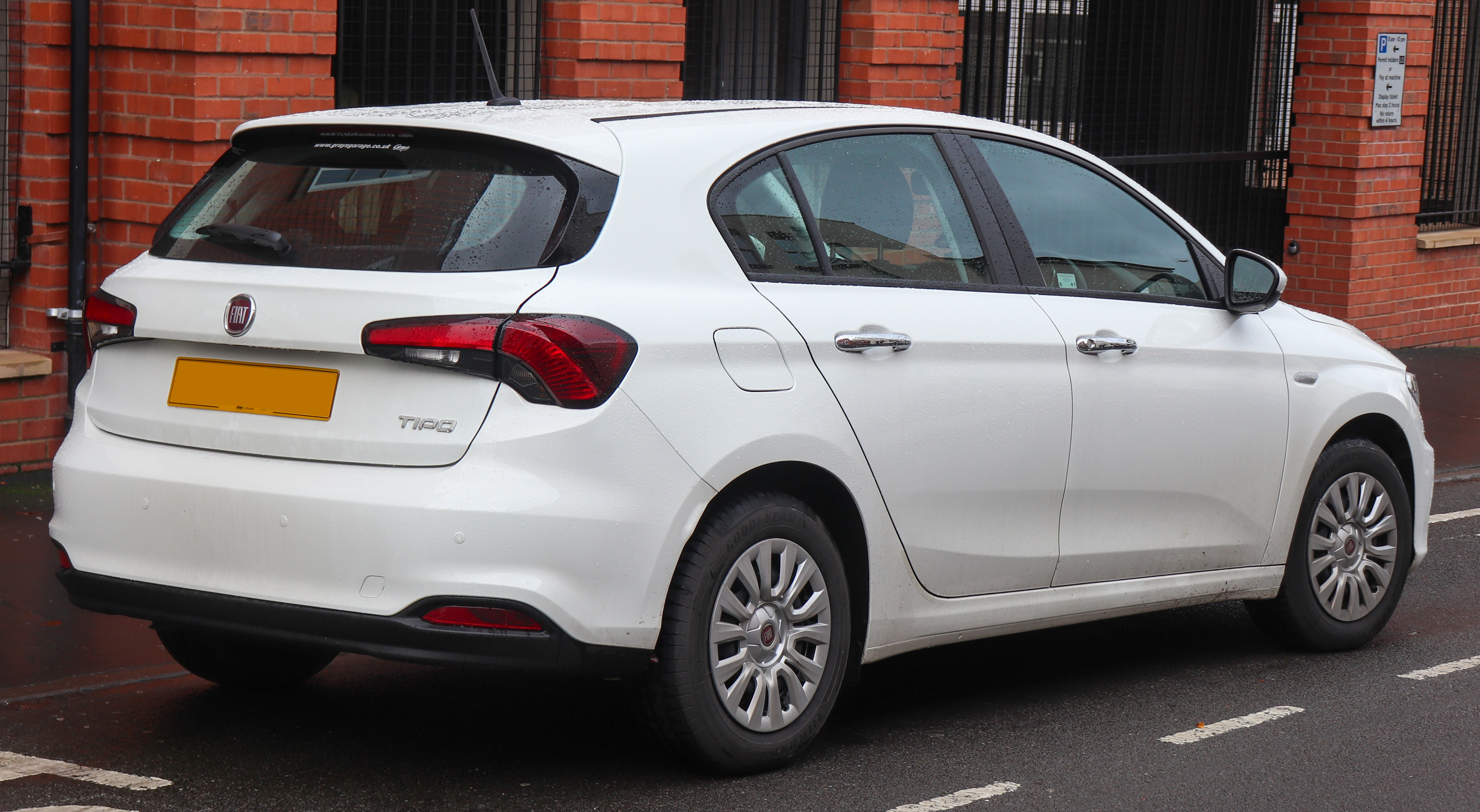
Hatchback (pre-facelift)

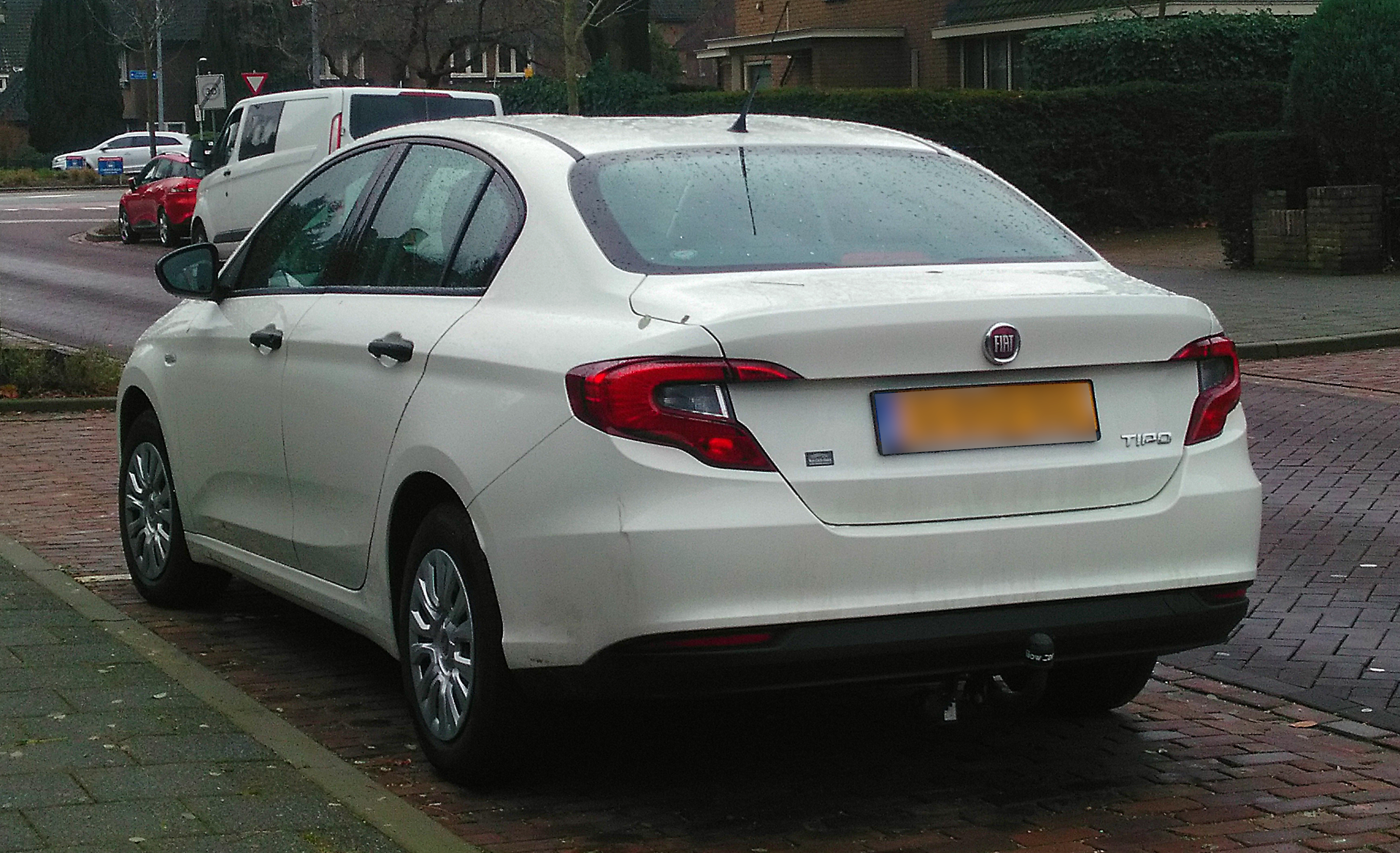
Sedan (pre-facelift)

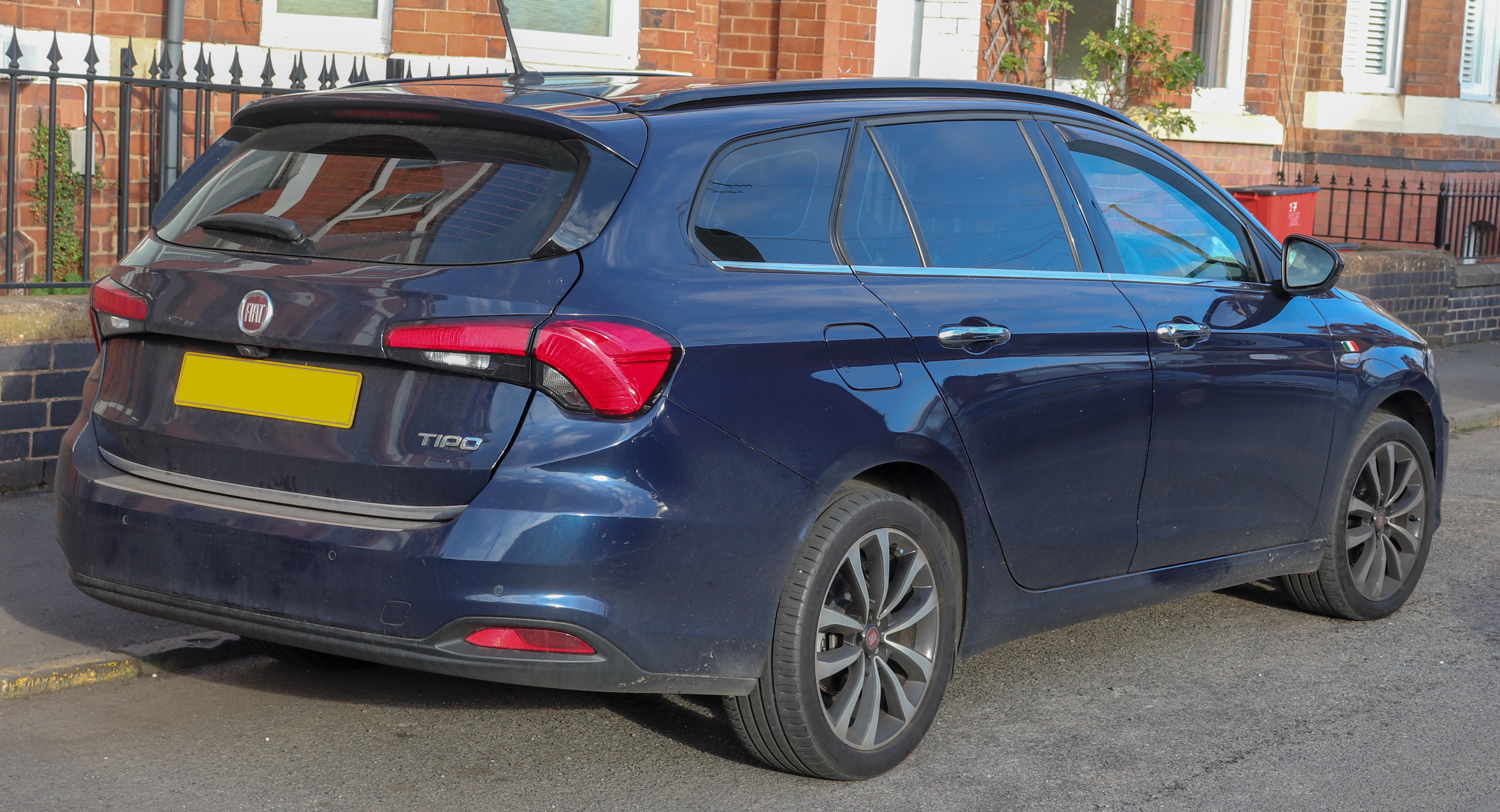
Station wagon/estate (pre-facelift)

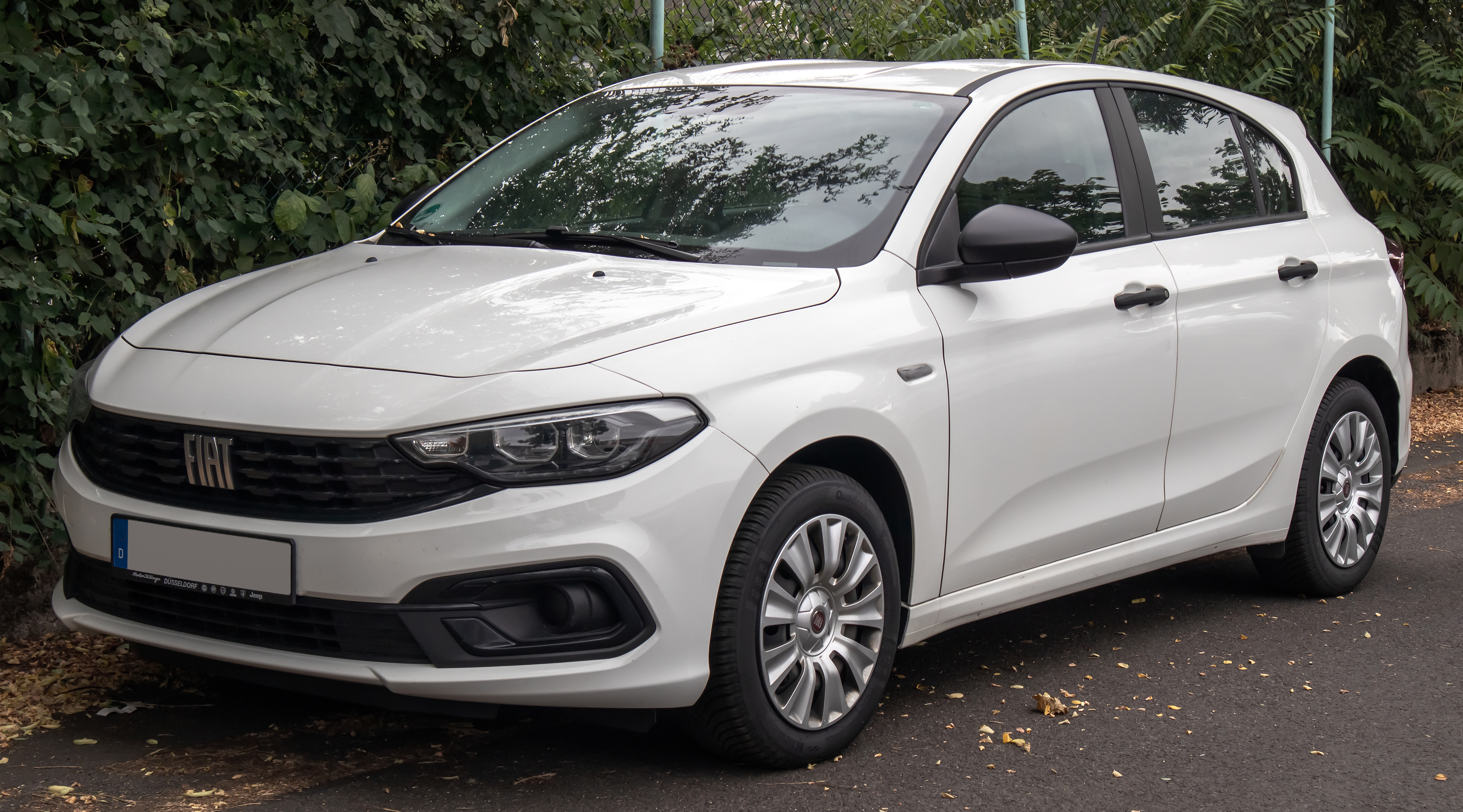
Hatchback (facelift)

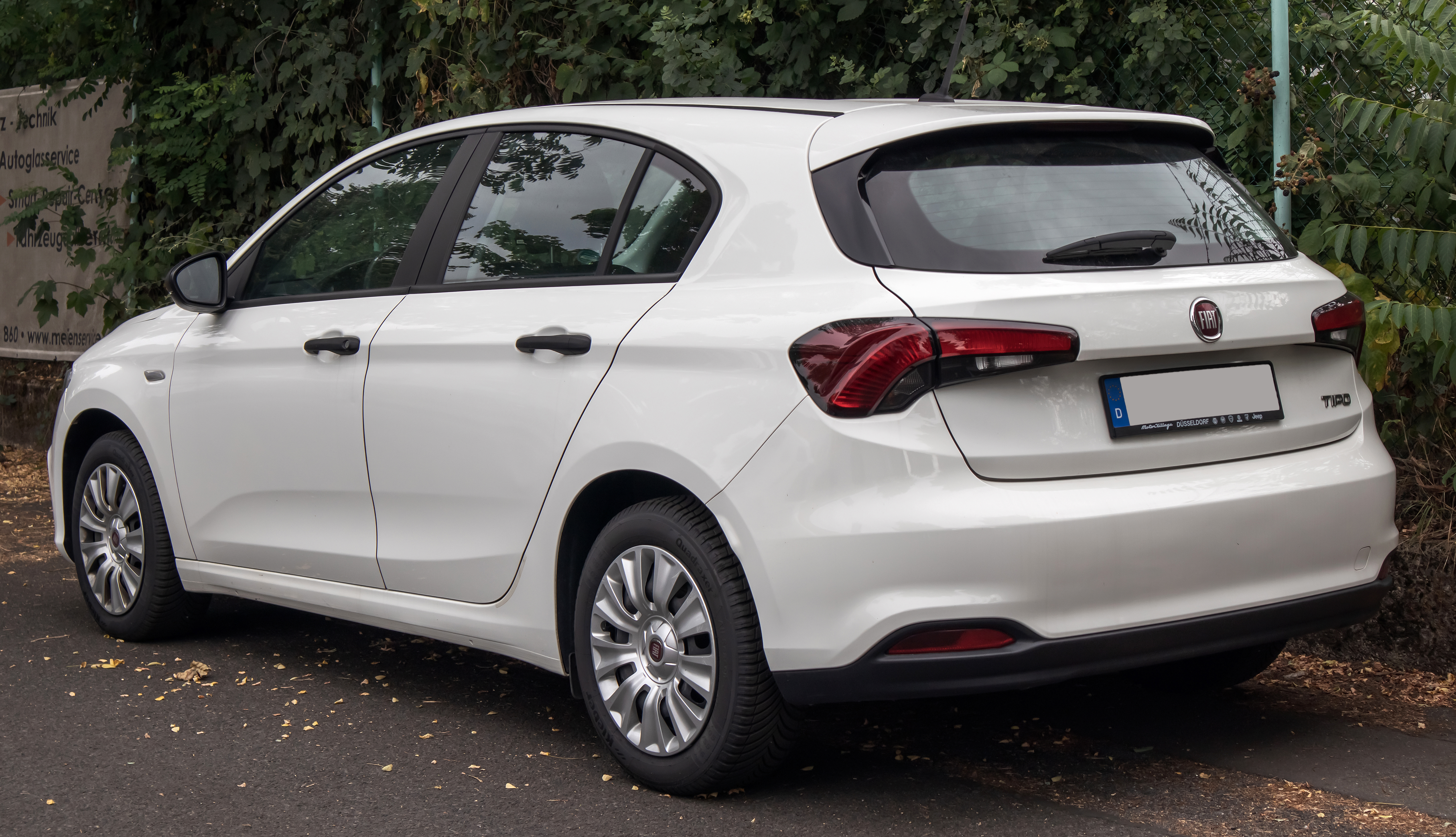
Hatchback (facelift)

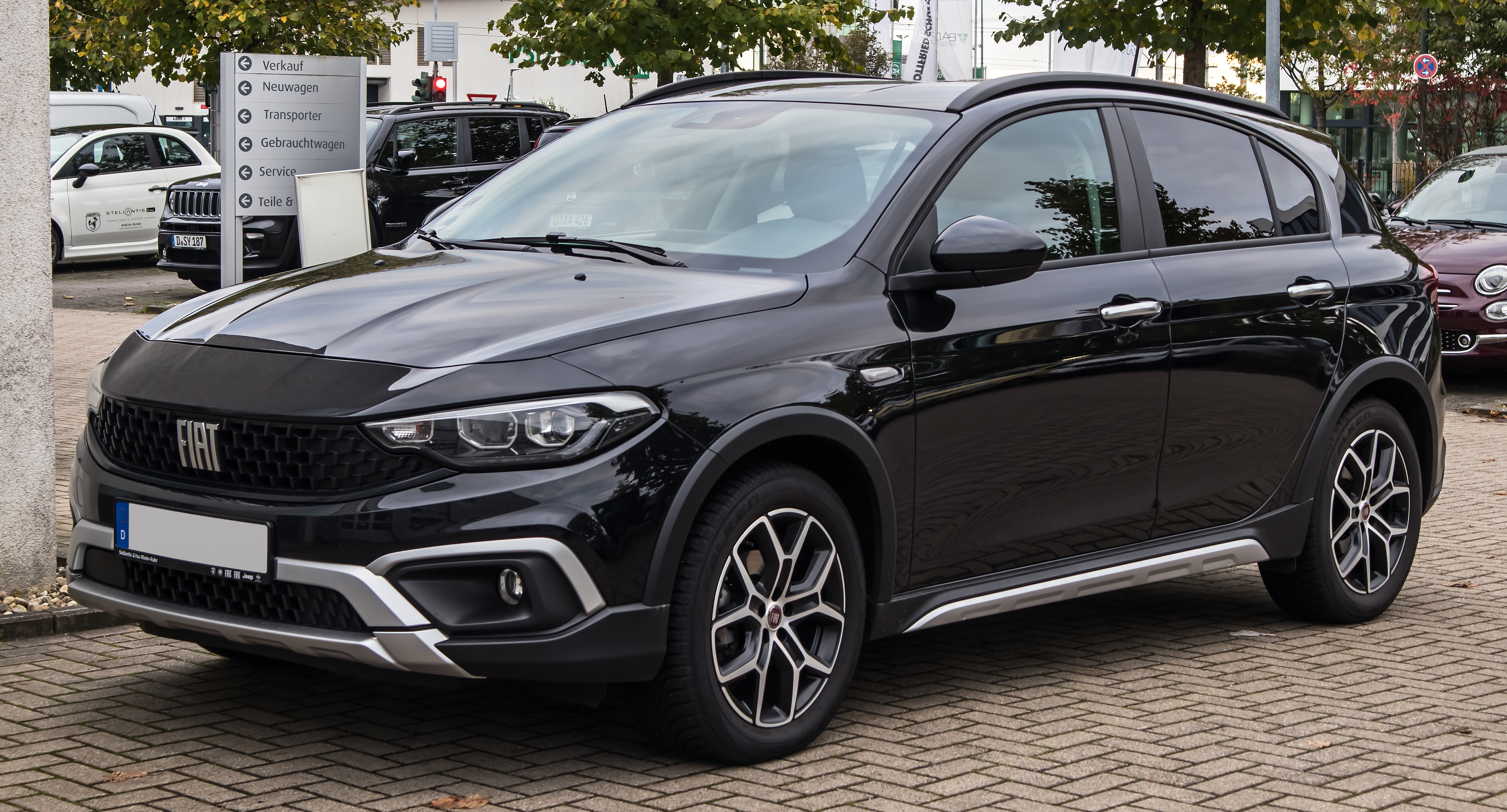
Cross hatchback

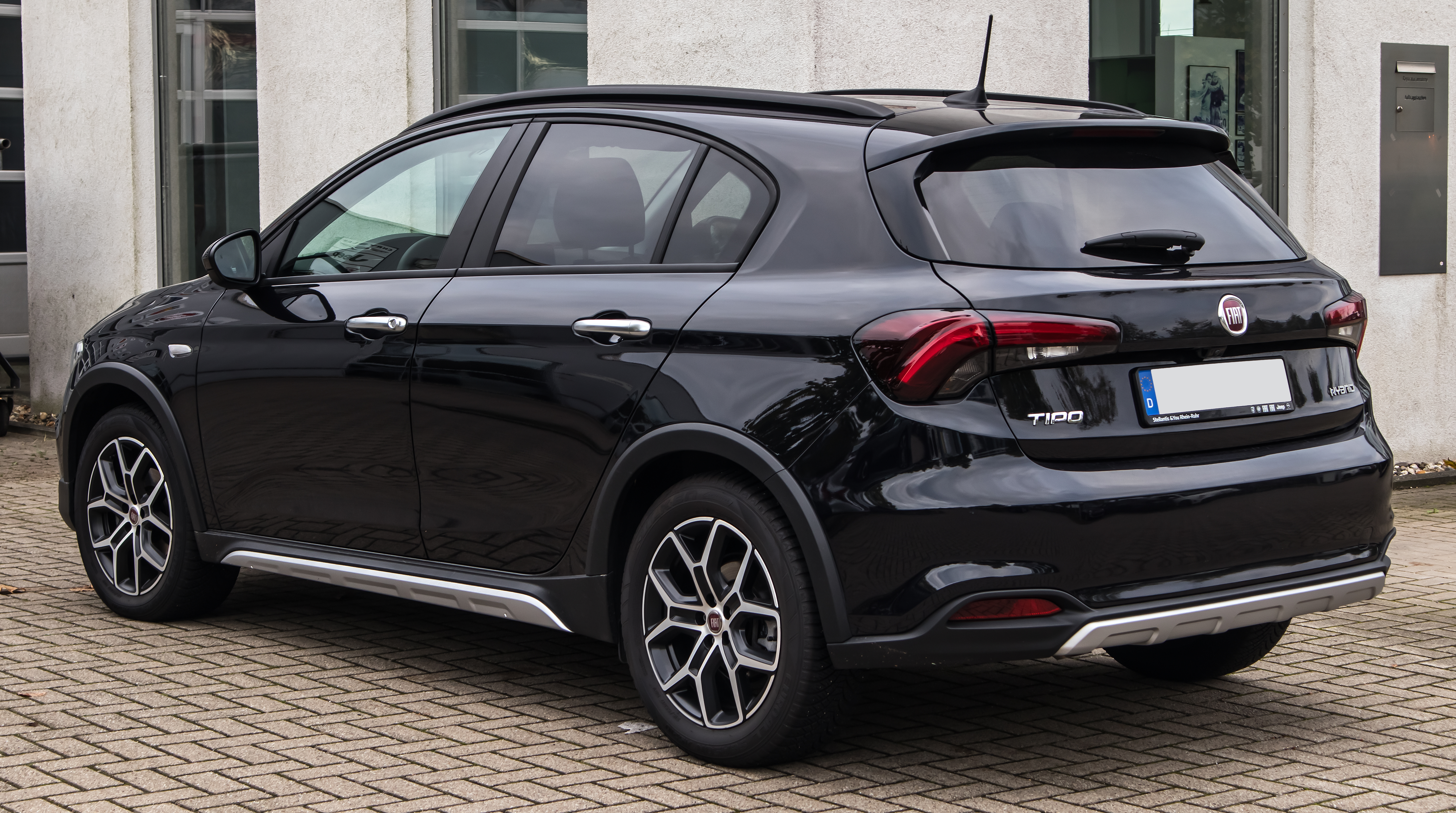
Cross hatchback

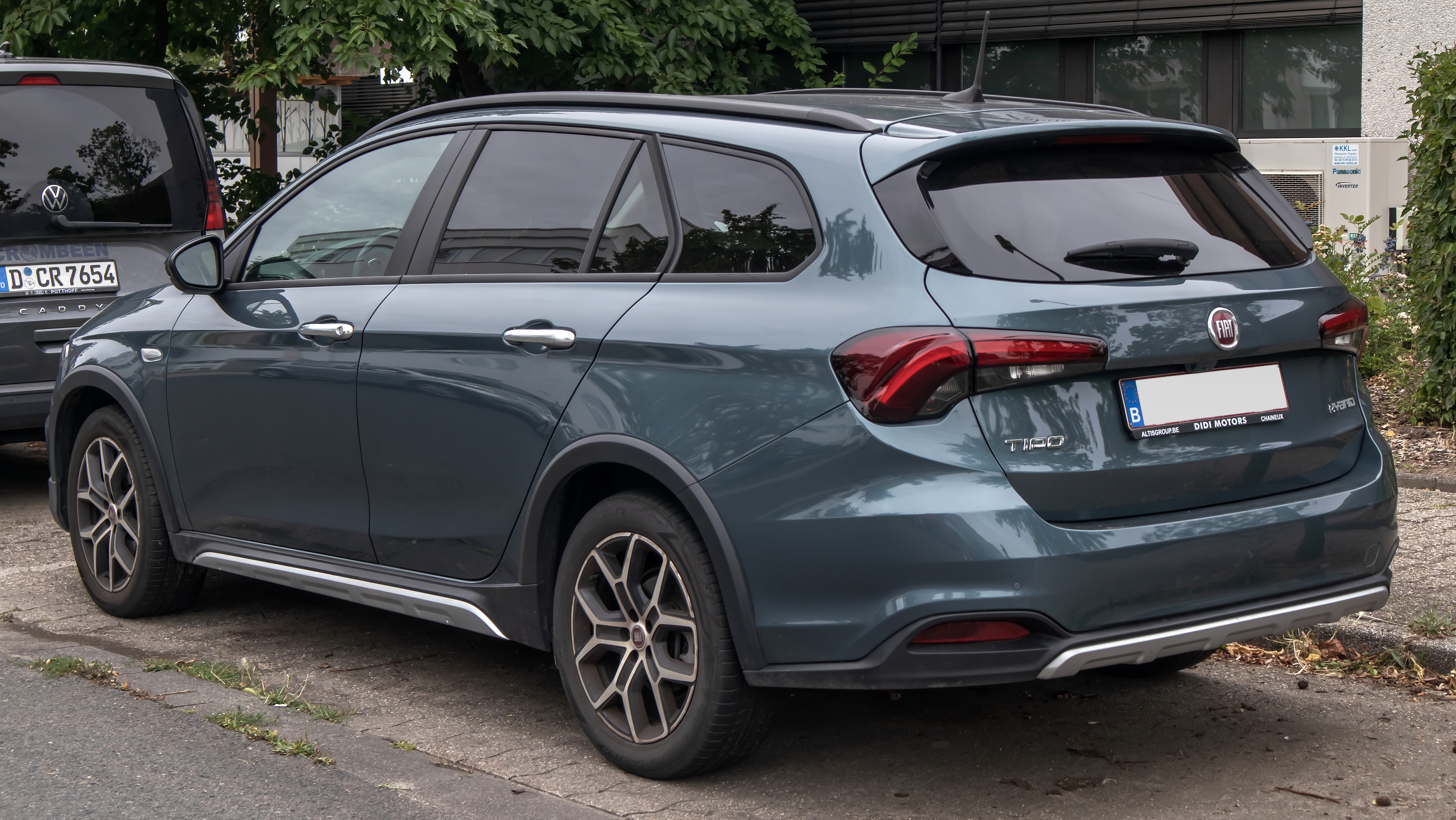
Cross station wagon/estate

=== The Tipo in other markets ===
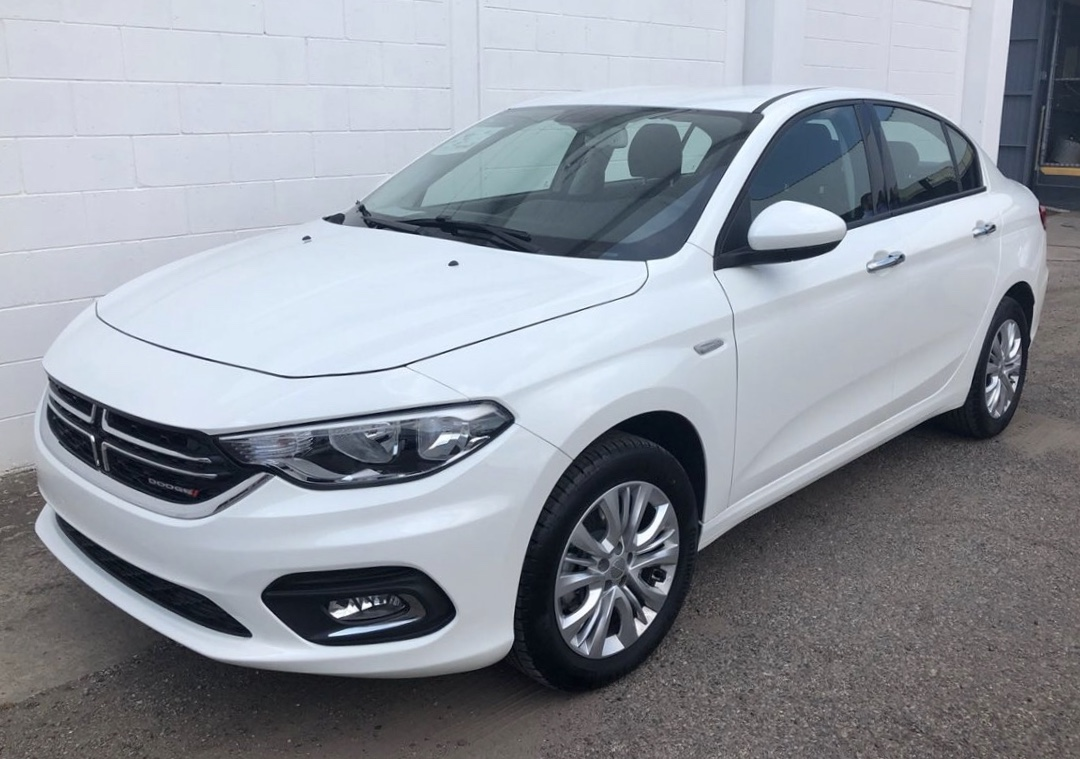
Dodge Neon in Mexico

In addition to the European market, the Tipo is also sold in 2016 in Africa in hatchback and sedan version. Originally the Tipo had been developed to be sold in 40 world markets. In 2016 FCA decided to also sell it in Mexico, albeit under the Dodge Neon name, as the Dodge brand has a much larger sales network in Mexico than Fiat does. Moreover, the earlier Dodge Neon was very successful in Mexico for the Chrysler Group in the nineties and two-thousands. The Mexican market only receives the three-volume saloon variant. From 2017 the Tipo is sold as a Dodge Neon in the Middle East as well. In South America, the Tipo sedan is sold under the Fiat brand only in Argentina and Chile, as the South American branch of the Italian brand already offers the slightly more compact Fiat Cronos, a compact sedan produced in Córdoba, Argentina. As of November 2020, the Tipo was no longer available in Argentina.

== Sales ==
Calendar year	Europe (Note: Europe: 2020 EU 27 + UK + Switzerland + Norway + Iceland)	Turkey (Egea)	México (Neon)
2015		5,674	
2016	61,023	38,260	2,491
2017	125,619	47,704	5,271
2018	89,622	36,649	2,289
2019	84,789	55,432	899
2020	47,905	90,631	1,025
2021	38,673	71,741	70
2022	22,933	97,078	
2023	18,552	121,798	
2024	11,583	84,941	
2025		42,838	

The Tipo is the best-selling car in Turkey from 2016 to 2024. In total, over 1.2 million were produced.
