= Fiat E.torQ engine =

E.torQ engine

Overview
- Manufacturer: Fiat
- Production: 2010-2023 (Brazil)

Layout
- Configuration: Naturally aspirated Straight-4
- Displacement: 1.6 L (1,598 cc); 1.7 L (1,747 cc)
- Cylinder bore: 77 mm (3.03 in); 80.5 mm (3.17 in)
- Piston stroke: 85.8 mm (3.38 in)
- Cylinder block material: Cast iron
- Cylinder head material: Aluminum alloy
- Valvetrain: SOHC 4 valves x cyl.
- Valvetrain drive system: Timing chain

RPM range
- Max. engine speed: 6500 RPM (1.6 16V 115cv)

Combustion
- Fuel system: Sequential Multipoint Fuel injection
- Fuel type: Gasoline, Ethanol
- Oil system: Wet sump
- Cooling system: Water-cooled

Output
- Power output: 110–139 PS (81–102 kW; 108–137 hp)
- Torque output: 152–189 N⋅m (15.5–19.3 kg⋅m; 112.1–139.4 lb⋅ft)

Chronology
- Predecessor: Tritec engine; GM 1.8 X18XE; Fiat Torque engine
- Successor: Fiat Global Small Engine

The E.torQ is a family of inline-4 gasoline automobile engines produced since 2010 by Fiat Chrysler Automobiles in Campo Largo, Brazil in the former Tritec factory. In November of 2022 Stellantis announced they were closing the Campo Largo factory ending production of the E.torQ 1.8 to focus on production of the newer FCA Global Small Engine.

The E.torQ series is an update on the Tritec engine, albeit re-engineered by Fiat Powertrain Technologies with an investment of €83 million. Updates include a high pressure injected aluminum block from the previous iron, and upgraded motors and controllers for the CNC machines used in the manufacturing process to increase productivity and ease diagnosis. The engine block has cylinder head fittings separate from the cylinder jackets, the threads are positioned in the upper part of the water jackets, and the connections between the jackets and the outside are kept apart from the cylinder head fittings. 80% of torque becomes available at 1,500 rpm and 93% at 2,500.

The new family of E.torQ engines is composed of two variants: the 1.6 16v and the 1.8 16v; both engines are available in flexifuel (petrol or ethanol) version for the Brazilian and Paraguayan markets.

The series was introduced to replace General Motors' 1.8 Ecotec X18XE engine used in Brazilian Fiat models, as well as the old Torque engine used in various Fiat models.

In March 2018, the series reached a milestone of 1.2 million units produced; 35% of total production was exported to FCA plants in Argentina, Turkey, and Fiat's native Italy.

== 1.6 ==
The 1.6 L (1,598 cc) variant uses 77 mm × 85.8 mm (3.03 in × 3.38 in) bore and stroke.

Output:

- gasoline (European market): 110 PS (81 kW; 108 hp) at 5500 rpm with a torque of 152 N⋅m (15.5 kg⋅m; 112.1 lb⋅ft) at 4500 rpm
- gasoline (Latin American markets): 115 PS (85 kW; 113 hp) at 5500 rpm with a torque of 159 N⋅m (16.2 kg⋅m; 117.3 lb⋅ft) at 4500 rpm
- ethanol (Brazilian market): 117 PS (86 kW; 115 hp) at 5500 rpm with a torque of 165 N⋅m (16.8 kg⋅m; 121.7 lb⋅ft) at 4500 rpm

Application:

- 2010 – 2020 Fiat Palio Weekend/Adventure (178)
- 2010 – 2012 Fiat Palio (178)
- 2011 – 2017 Fiat Palio (326)
- 2011 – 2017 Fiat Punto (310)
- 2010 – 2012 Fiat Siena (178)
- 2012 – 2018 Fiat Grand Siena (326)/Dodge Vision
- 2010 – 2020 Fiat Strada (178)/RAM 700
- 2010 – 2016 Fiat Idea (Brazilian version)
- 2014 – present Jeep Renegade
- 2015 – present Fiat 500X
- 2015 – present Fiat Tipo (and rebadged Fiat Egea and Dodge Neon)

== 1.8 NPM ==
The 1.8L NPM (1,747cc) variant uses an 80.5 mm × 85.8 mm (3.17 in × 3.38 in) bore and stroke and a 11.2:1 compression ratio. The 1.8L block can be externally differentiated from the 1.6L version by a large "1.8" cast into the front of the block. It carries the 1.8 nomenclature despite being closer to 1.7L in displacement.

Output:

- gasoline (Latin American markets): 130 PS (96 kW; 128 hp) at 5250 rpm with a torque of 181 N⋅m (18.5 kg⋅m; 133.5 lb⋅ft) at 4500 rpm
- ethanol (Brazilian and Paraguayan markets): 132 PS (97 kW; 130 hp) at 5250 rpm with a torque of 185 N⋅m (18.9 kg⋅m; 136.4 lb⋅ft) at 4500 rpm

Application:

- 2011 – 2016 Fiat Linea
- 2011 – 2014 Fiat Bravo (198)
- 2011 – 2017 Fiat Punto (310)
- 2011 – 2021 Fiat Doblò
- 2010 – 2020 Fiat Palio Weekend/Adventure (178)
- 2010 – 2020 Fiat Strada (178)
- 2010 – 2016 Fiat Idea (Brazilian version)
- 2015 – 2022 Jeep Renegade
- 2016 – 2023 Fiat Toro
- 2017 – 2022 Fiat Argo
- 2018 - 2022 Fiat Cronos

== 1.8 EVO ==
Starting with the 2015 model year Jeep Renegade the E.torQ engine received a variable cam phasing system that operated over a wide range, allowing for 60° of variation. The compression ratio was raised to 12.5:1. The high compression ratio was utilised in conjunction with the variable cam timing to allow the engine to operate in Atkinson cycle mode. This change in cam phasing also allows for a lower RPM onset of peak torque. Other revisions include updated pistons, a variable rate oil pump, higher energy ignition system, iridium spark plugs, and a cold start system utilizing a single fuel injector that pulls fuel from an auxiliary fuel tank filled with gasoline to assist with starting the engine when fueled with ethanol.

Output:

- gasoline (Jeep Renegade): 130 PS (96 kW; 128 hp) at 5250 rpm with a torque of 18.6 kgf⋅m (134.5 lb⋅ft; 182.4 N⋅m) at 3750 rpm
- ethanol (Jeep Renegade): 132 PS (97 kW; 130 hp) at 5250 rpm with a torque of 19.1 kgf⋅m (138.2 lb⋅ft; 187.3 N⋅m) at 3750 rpm

== 1.8 EVO VIS ==
For the 2016 model year Jeep Renegade the EVO engine was updated again with VIS (Variable Induction System) that uses a set of electronically actuated valves to alternate between two separate intake tracks of different lengths, with the crossover occurring at 4250 RPM. This allows the engine to make more power at higher RPM. This update also adds a Marelli HCSS cold start system that heats the ethanol in the fuel rail.

Output:

- gasoline (Fiat Toro, Fiat Argo and Jeep Renegade): 135 PS (99 kW; 133 hp) at 5750 rpm with a torque of 184 N⋅m (18.8 kg⋅m; 135.7 lb⋅ft) at 3750 rpm
- ethanol (Fiat Toro, Fiat Argo and Jeep Renegade): 139 PS (102 kW; 137 hp) at 5750 rpm with a torque of 189 N⋅m (19.3 kg⋅m; 139.4 lb⋅ft) at 3750 rpm
