= Jeep Renegade =

Subcompact crossover SUV

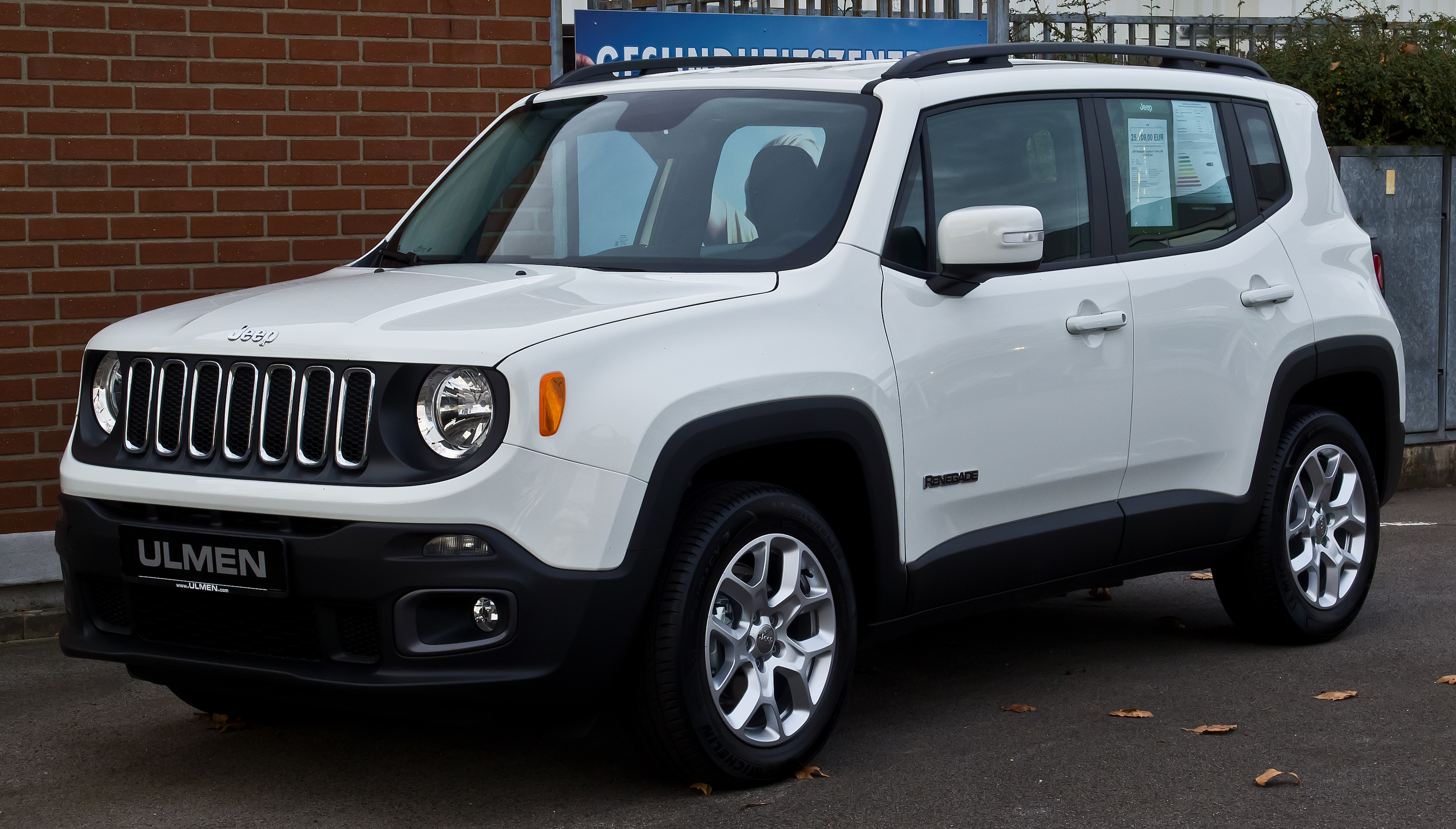

Overview
- Manufacturer: Jeep (Note: FCA US LLC (2014–2021); Stellantis North America (2021–present))
- Production: 2014–present; 2016–2022 (China)
- Model years: 2015–2023 (US & Canada); 2015–2025 (Europe); 2015–present (Latin America)
- Assembly: Italy: Melfi, Potenza (SATA); Brazil: Goiana, Pernambuco; China: Guangzhou (GAC FCA)
- Designer: Jeremy Glover and Ian Hedge

Body and chassis
- Class: Subcompact crossover SUV (B)
- Body style: 5-door SUV
- Layout: Front-engine, front-wheel drive or all-wheel drive
- Platform: FCA Small Wide 4×4
- Related: Fiat 500X; Fiat 500L; Fiat Tipo (2015); Fiat Toro

Powertrain
- Engine: Gasoline: 1.0 L GSE T3 turbo I3; 1.3 L GSE T4 turbo I4; 1.4 L FIRE turbo I4; 1.6 L E.torq I4; 1.8 L E.torq I4 flex fuel; 2.0 L Tigershark I4 (China); 2.4 L Tigershark I4; Gasoline plug-in hybrid: 1.3 L GSE T4 turbo I4; Diesel: 1.6 L Multijet II turbo I4; 2.0 L Multijet II turbo I4
- Electric motor: 45 kW (60 hp; 61 PS) FCA eMotor (4xe)
- Transmission: 5-speed FPT C510 Manual; 6-speed FPT C630 Manual (1.0); 6-speed FPT C635 Manual; 6-speed FPT C635 Dual-Clutch Automatic; 6-speed Aisin TF-60SN Torque Converter Automatic (4xe); 7-speed FPT C725 Dual-Clutch Automatic; 9-speed ZF 948TE Torque Converter Automatic
- Hybrid drivetrain: PHEV (4xe)
- Battery: 11.4 kWh 400-volt Li-ion pack

Dimensions
- Wheelbase: 101.2 in (2,570 mm)
- Length: 166.6 in (4,232 mm)
- Width: 71.1 in (1,806 mm)
- Height: 66.5 in (1,689 mm)
- Curb weight: 3,078–3,549 lb (1,396–1,610 kg)

The Jeep Renegade is a subcompact crossover SUV produced by Stellantis under their Jeep marque. It was first shown to the public in March 2014 at the Geneva Motor Show and production started in late August of that year. The Renegade was the smallest modern vehicle marketed by Jeep until the arrival of the Avenger. It slots between the Avenger and the Compass. It is based on the FCA Small Wide 4×4 platform, which is also shared with other FCA models, including those from Fiat and Alfa Romeo brands.

The Renegade comes as standard with front-wheel drive, with optional four-wheel drive systems Active Drive I and Active Drive Low, both of which are paired with Jeep's Selec-Terrain System.

== Overview ==
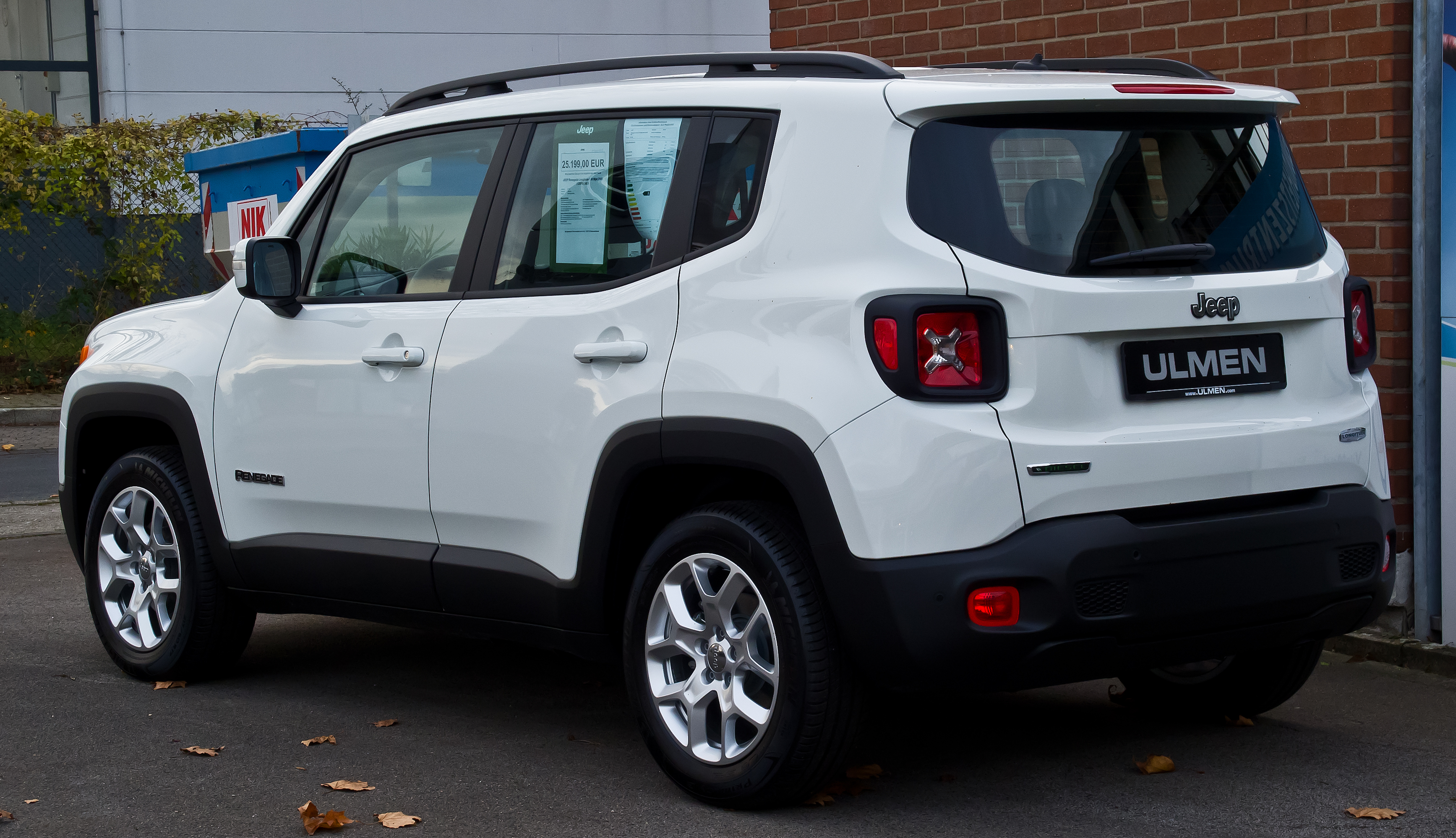
Jeep Renegade 1.6 MultiJet (Germany)

The Renegade is the first Jeep product to be produced exclusively outside of North America and has been sold in the North American, European, Brazilian, South African, Australian, Japanese, and Chinese markets. The vehicle is built in Melfi, Italy, with the designation BU/520, alongside the related Fiat 500X; Goiana, Brazil with the designation B1 (alongside Jeep Compass and Fiat Toro); and in Guangzhou, China codenamed BQ.

Standard Renegade models come with front-wheel drive, with four-wheel drive available on Sport, Latitude, and Limited trims. In the US, the lineup consists of Sport, Latitude and Limited trims, all of which come with a choice of front- and four-wheel drive, as well as the Trailhawk trim, which is 4WD only.

The Renegade has an available My Sky dual-panel removable roof. The My Sky can be either retracted like a standard sunroof or removed completely for a more open-air experience, similar to that of the Jeep Wrangler.

== Trim levels ==
In North America, the Renegade is sold in Sport, Latitude, Altitude, Limited, and Trailhawk trim levels:

=== Sport ===
The base Sport model includes a 1.4L MultiAir Turbocharged Inline Four-Cylinder (I4) engine or a 2.4L multiair inline 4 engine, a six-speed manual transmission or 9 speed automatic transmission, sixteen-inch, black-finished steel wheels, a black-finished front grille, black side mirrors and door handles, the Uconnect 3.0 AM/FM stereo w/ USB, iPod, and 3.5-millimeter auxiliary audio input jacks and four speakers, a heater, dual air conditioning, cloth seating surfaces, a 3.5-inch monochromatic instrument cluster display screen, remote keyless entry with power door locks, and more. The Power and Air Group adds air conditioning and power windows. The Sound Group adds the Uconnect 5.0BT AM/FM stereo with USB, iPod, and 3.5-millimeter auxiliary audio input jacks with a five-inch color touch-screen display, voice command, Uconnect hands-free Bluetooth phone and stereo wireless audio streaming, and six speakers.

=== Latitude ===
The mid-level Latitude model includes the Sport's standard equipment, plus seventeen-inch black-accented alloy wheels, exterior-colored side mirrors and door handles, the Uconnect 5.0BT AM/FM stereo w/ USB, iPod, and 3.5-millimeter auxiliary audio input jacks with five-inch color touch-screen display, voice command, Uconnect hands-free Bluetooth phone and stereo wireless audio streaming, and six speakers, power windows, air conditioning, and more. The MySky removable "sunroof" roof panels, both manually-removable or power-retractable, are available on this model and higher-end models. In Europe, this is called Longitude.

=== Limited ===
The top-of-the-line Limited model includes the Latitude's standard equipment, plus the 2.4L Tigershark Inline Four-Cylinder (I4) engine, a nine-speed automatic transmission, leather seating surfaces, a silver-finished front grille, chrome side mirrors and door handles, and more. The MySky removable "sunroof" panels, both manually-removable or power-retractable, are available on this model, the Latitude model, and higher-end models.

=== Trailhawk ===
The off-road-ready Trailhawk model includes the Latitude's standard equipment, plus the 2.4L Tigershark Inline Four-Cylinder (I4) engine (2.0L Multijet II only for Europe), a nine-speed automatic transmission, red-finished front tow hooks, off-road suspension with underbody skid plates, a rugged interior, and more. The MySky removable "sunroof" panels, both manually-removable or power-retractable, are available on this model, the Latitude model, and higher-end models.

Trailhawk models are "Trail Rated" and feature Jeep's Active Drive Low four-wheel drive system and a 20 mm (0.79 in) lift kit. It also features 17 in (430 mm) aluminum wheels, skid plates, and unique front and rear fascias compared to standard Renegade models. Like the Jeep Cherokee Trailhawk, the Renegade Trailhawk features red front and rear tow hooks, a red 'Trail Rated 4X4' badge on both front upper fenders, a black vinyl decal in the center of the hood, and alloy wheels with black-painted accents. The Trailhawk model emphasizes the Renegade's off-road capabilities and is meant for the avid off-roader. In addition, there is an exclusive Deserthawk trim level that adds specific decals, interior badging and other amenities aimed at the dedicated off-road enthusiast, such as a factory included towing package, and a slightly taller lift kit than other TrailHawk trims. (8 in (200 mm))

The Jeep Selec-terrain traction control feature lets you choose any of the following modes in the 4X4 Trailhawk version: Auto, Snow, Sand, Mud, or Rock.

=== Optional features ===
All models other than the base Sport model offer optional features such as passive entry with push-button start, a remote start system, the Uconnect 6.5AN stereo with AM/FM HD Radio, iPod/USB and 3.5-millimeter auxiliary audio input jacks, SIRIUS-XM Satellite Radio, voice command, Uconnect ACCESS and Apps with hands-free Bluetooth phone and stereo wireless audio streaming, GPS navigation by Garmin, a 6.5-inch touch-screen display, and steering wheel-mounted remote controls, nine premium amplified speakers with a subwoofer, power front bucket seats, the MySky retractable roof panel system (manually-removable or power-retractable), heated dual front bucket seats, and more.

== Powertrain ==
All Renegade models are powered by 3 or 4-cylinder engines, sourced both from Fiat and Chrysler, depending on market.

Engine	Power	Transmission	Year	Regions
FCA 1.0 L I3 GSE MultiAir3 Turbo	88 kW (118 hp; 120 PS)	6-speed Fiat C630 manual	2018–Present	Europe
FCA 1.3 L I4 GSE MultiAir3 Turbo	110 kW (148 hp; 150 PS)	6-speed Fiat C635 DDCT dual clutch	2018–Present	Europe, Japan
FCA 1.3 L I4 GSE MultiAir3 Turbo	132 kW (177 hp; 179 PS)	9-speed Chrysler 948TE automatic	2018–Present	Europe, North America, Japan, Brazil
FCA 1.3 L I4 GSE MultiAir3 Turbo + FCA eMotor PHEV	95.6 kW (128 hp; 130 PS) (Engine); 45 kW (60 hp; 61 PS) (Electric Motor); 139.7 kW (187 hp; 190 PS) (Combined)	6-speed Aisin TF-60SN automatic	2021–Present	Europe, Japan
FCA 1.3 L I4 GSE MultiAir3 Turbo + FCA eMotor PHEV	132.4 kW (178 hp; 180 PS) (Engine); 45 kW (60 hp; 61 PS) (Electric Motor); 176.5 kW (237 hp; 240 PS) (Combined)	6-speed Aisin TF-60SN automatic	2021–Present	Europe, Japan
Fiat 1.4 L I4 FIRE MultiAir2 Turbo	103 kW (138 hp; 140 PS)	6-speed Fiat C635 manual	2014–2018	Europe, Japan, Australia
Fiat 1.4 L I4 FIRE MultiAir2 Turbo	103 kW (138 hp; 140 PS)	6-speed Fiat C635 DDCT dual clutch	2014–2018	Europe, Japan, Australia
Fiat 1.4 L I4 FIRE MultiAir2 Turbo	125 kW (168 hp; 170 PS)	9-speed Chrysler 948TE automatic	2015–2018	Europe
Fiat 1.4 L I4 FIRE MultiAir Turbo	119 kW (160 hp; 162 PS)	6-speed Fiat C635 manual	2014–2018	North America, Latin America
Fiat 1.4 L I4 FIRE MultiAir Turbo	119 kW (160 hp; 162 PS)	9-speed Chrysler 948TE automatic	2014–2018	North America, Latin America
Fiat 1.4 L I4 FIRE Turbo	110 kW (148 hp; 150 PS)	7-speed Fiat C725 DDCT dual clutch	2016–2022	China
Fiat 1.4 L I4 FIRE Turbo LPG	88 kW (118 hp; 120 PS)	6-speed manual	2017–2018	
Chrysler 2.0 L I4 Tigershark	114 kW (153 hp; 155 PS)	9-speed Chrysler 948TE automatic	2016–2022	China
Chrysler 2.4 L I4 Tigershark MultiAir2	134 kW (180 hp; 182 PS)	9-speed Chrysler 948TE automatic	2014–2021	North America, Latin America, Middle East
Chrysler 2.4 L I4 Tigershark MultiAir2	129 kW (173 hp; 175 PS)	9-speed Chrysler 948TE automatic	2015–2021	Japan, Australia
Fiat 1.6 L I4 E.torQ	81 kW (109 hp; 110 PS)	5-speed Fiat C510 manual	2015–2018	Europe, Australia
Fiat 1.8 L I4 E.torQ Flex	97 kW (130 hp; 132 PS)	5-speed Fiat C510 manual	2015–Present	Latin America
Fiat 1.8 L I4 E.torQ Flex	97 kW (130 hp; 132 PS)	6-speed Aisin automatic	2015–Present	Latin America
Fiat 1.6 L I4 MultiJet2	70 kW (94 hp; 95 PS)	6-speed manual	2017–2018	Italy
Fiat 1.6 L I4 MultiJet2	88 kW (118 hp; 120 PS)	6-speed Fiat C635 manual	2014–Present	Europe
Fiat 1.6 L I4 MultiJet2	88 kW (118 hp; 120 PS)	6-speed Fiat C635 DDCT dual clutch	2017–Present	Europe
Fiat 2.0 L I4 MultiJet2	88 kW (118 hp; 120 PS)	6-speed Fiat C635 manual	2015–2018	Italy
Fiat 2.0 L I4 MultiJet2	103 kW (138 hp; 140 PS); 125 kW (168 hp; 170 PS)	6-speed Fiat C635 manual	2014–Present	Europe, Brazil (only the 9-speed automatic, 170 PS, was available in Brazil. It was discontinued in 2022)
Fiat 2.0 L I4 MultiJet2	103 kW (138 hp; 140 PS); 125 kW (168 hp; 170 PS)	9-speed Chrysler 948TE automatic	2014–Present	Europe, Brazil (only the 9-speed automatic, 170 PS, was available in Brazil. It was discontinued in 2022)

== Interior features ==
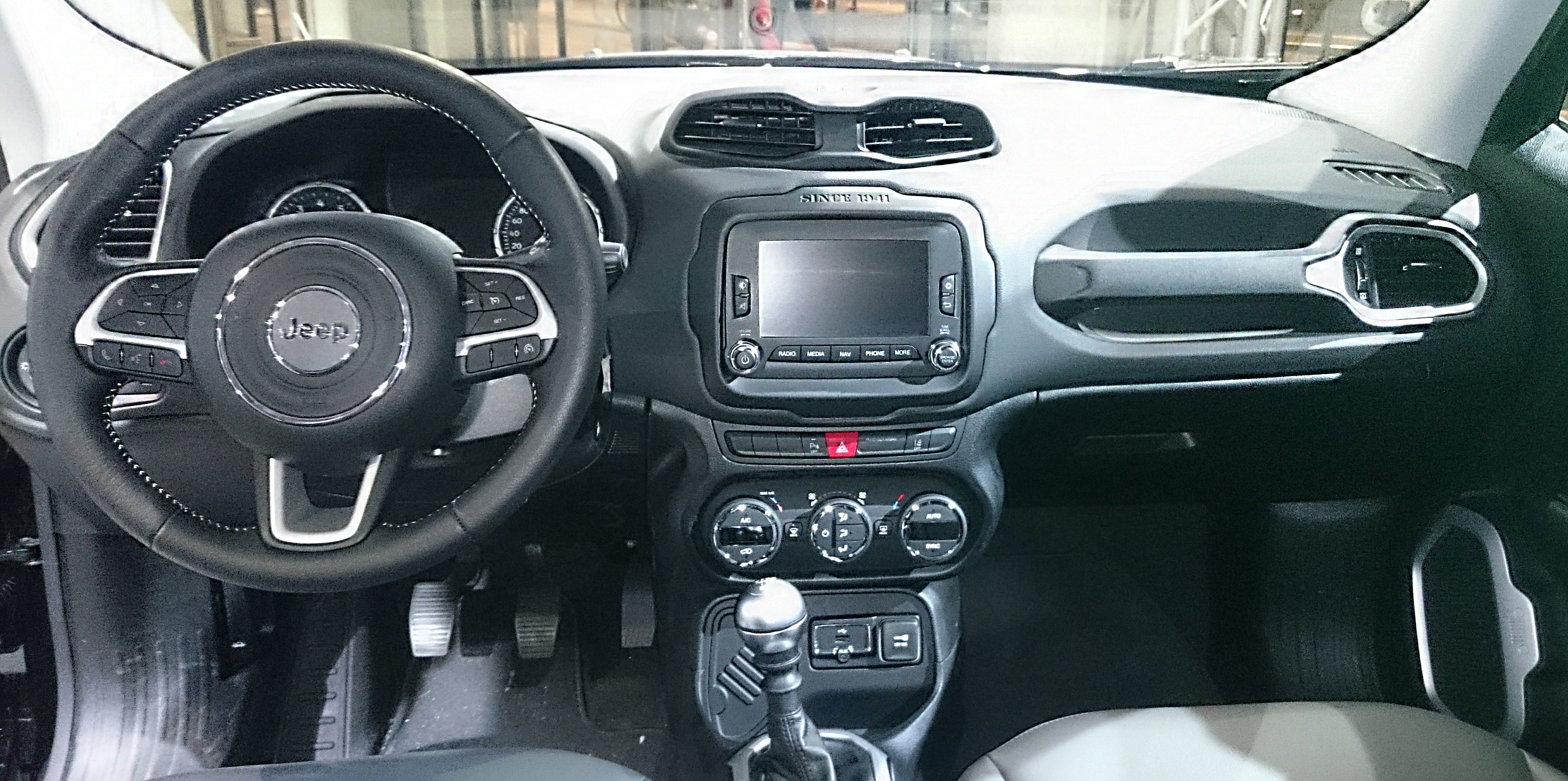
Interior

The Renegade offers either cloth or leather seating surfaces. It offers seating for five passengers, with a 60/40 split-folding rear bench seat, and a fold-flat front passenger's seat for more cargo capacity.

In North America, it offers a standard Uconnect 5.0BT radio with an AM/FM radio, Sirius XM satellite radio, voice command, a Microsoft-derived touch screen interface, and iPod and USB inputs, as well as a 3.5-millimeter auxiliary audio input jack. Uconnect Phone will also be standard. A rearview backup camera will be optional. The optional radio will be the UConnect 6.0 radio, offering all the features of the UConnect 5.0BT radio, while adding a touch screen interface designed by BlackBerry (a smaller version of the UConnect 8.4A and 8.4AN radios), and navigation system capabilities by Garmin.

== Safety ==
=== ANCAP ===
ANCAP test results* Jeep Renegade all front-wheel-drive variants (2016)
Test	Score
Overall	5 /5 stars
Frontal offset	15.41/16
Side impact	16/16
Pole	2/2
Seat belt reminders	3/3
Whiplash protection	Good
Pedestrian protection	Adequate
Electronic stability control	Standard

=== IIHS ===
The Renegade was safety tested by the IIHS in 2021.

IIHS scores (2021 model year):
Small overlap front (Driver)	Good	
Small overlap front (Passenger)	Acceptable	
Moderate overlap front	Good	
Moderate overlap front (updated test)	Poor	
Side (original test)	Good	
Side (updated test)	Marginal	
Roof strength	Good	
Head restraints and seats	Good	
Headlights	Acceptable / Marginal / Poor	varies by trim/option
Front crash prevention (Vehicle-to-Vehicle)	Superior	optional
Seat belt reminders	Marginal	
Child seat anchors (LATCH) ease of use	Acceptable	

=== NHTSA ===
NHTSA (2016)
Overall	4/5 stars
Frontal driver	4/5 stars
Frontal Passenger	4/5 stars
Side Driver	5/5 stars
Side Passenger	3/5 stars
Side Pole Driver	5/5 stars
Rollover	4/5 stars

=== Euro NCAP ===
==== 2014 ====
Euro NCAP test results* Jeep Renegade 1.6 diesel Limited FW (2014)
Test	Points	%
Overall:	5 /5 stars	
Adult occupant:	33.1	87%
Child occupant:	42	85%
Pedestrian:	23.6	65%
Safety assist:	9.7	74%

==== 2019 ====
Euro NCAP test results* Jeep Renegade 1.0 'LIMITED' (LHD) (2019)
Test	Points	%
Overall:	3 /5 stars	
Adult occupant:	31.2	82%
Child occupant:	41.4	84%
Pedestrian:	26.7	55%
Safety assist:	7.6	58%

=== Latin NCAP ===
==== 2015 ====
The Renegade was safety tested by Latin NCAP 1.0 in its most basic Latin American market configuration in 2015 and earned a five-star rating.

Latin NCAP 1.5 test results Jeep Renegade + 2 Airbags (2015, similar to Euro NCAP 2002)
Test	Points	Stars
Adult occupant:	16.12/17.0	5 /5 stars
Child occupant:	43.54/49.00	5 /5 stars

==== 2023 ====
The Renegade, in its most basic Latin American market configuration, was safety tested by Latin NCAP 3.0 in 2023 (similar to Euro NCAP 2014) and earned a one-star rating.

Latin NCAP 3.5 test results Jeep Renegade + 2 Airbags (2023, similar to Euro NCAP 2017)
Test	Points	%
Overall:	1 /5 stars	
Adult occupant:	19.48	49%
Child occupant:	32.69	67%
Pedestrian:	21.75	45%
Safety assist:	24.00	56%

== Model year changes ==
=== 2019 model year ===
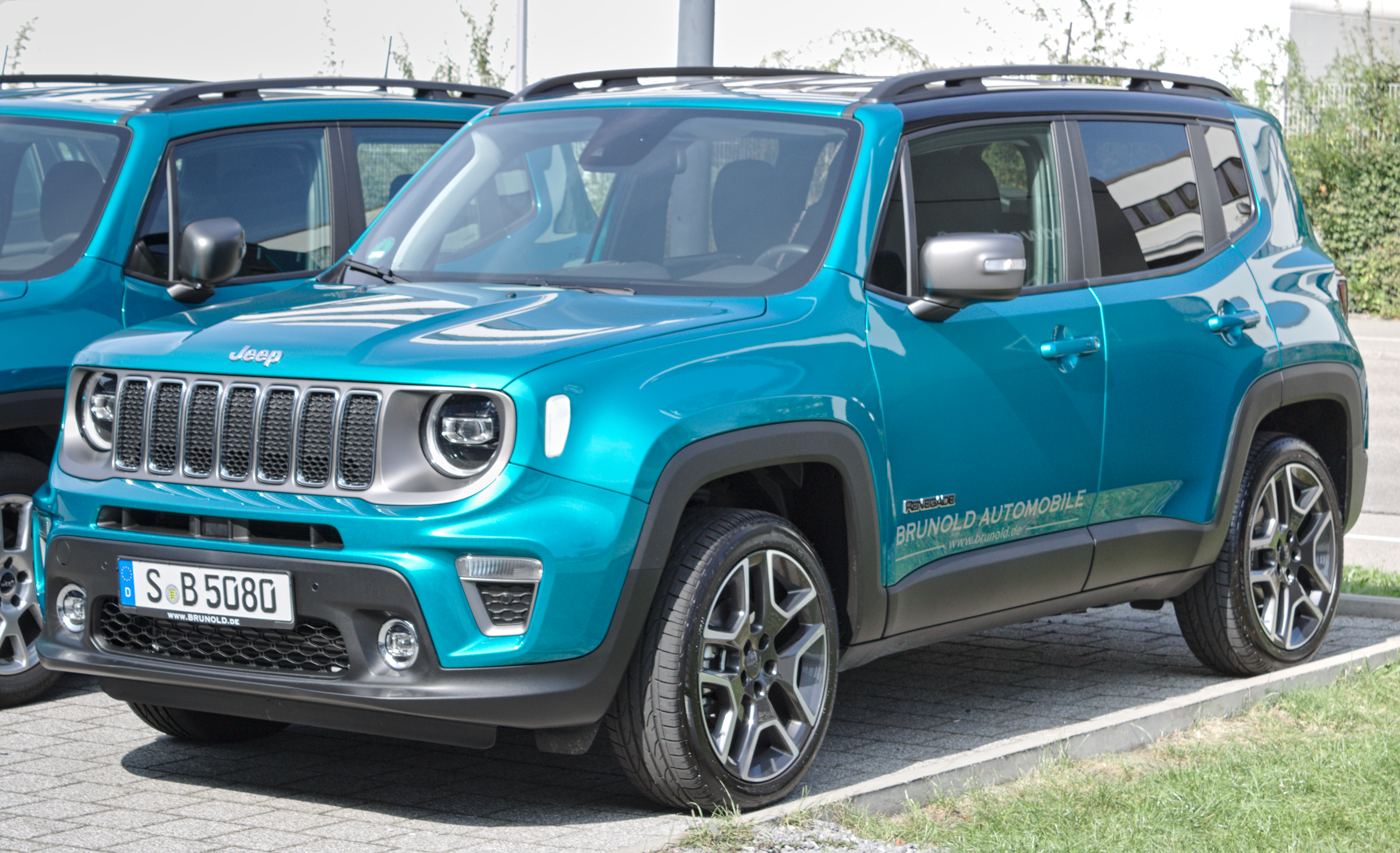
2019 Renegade

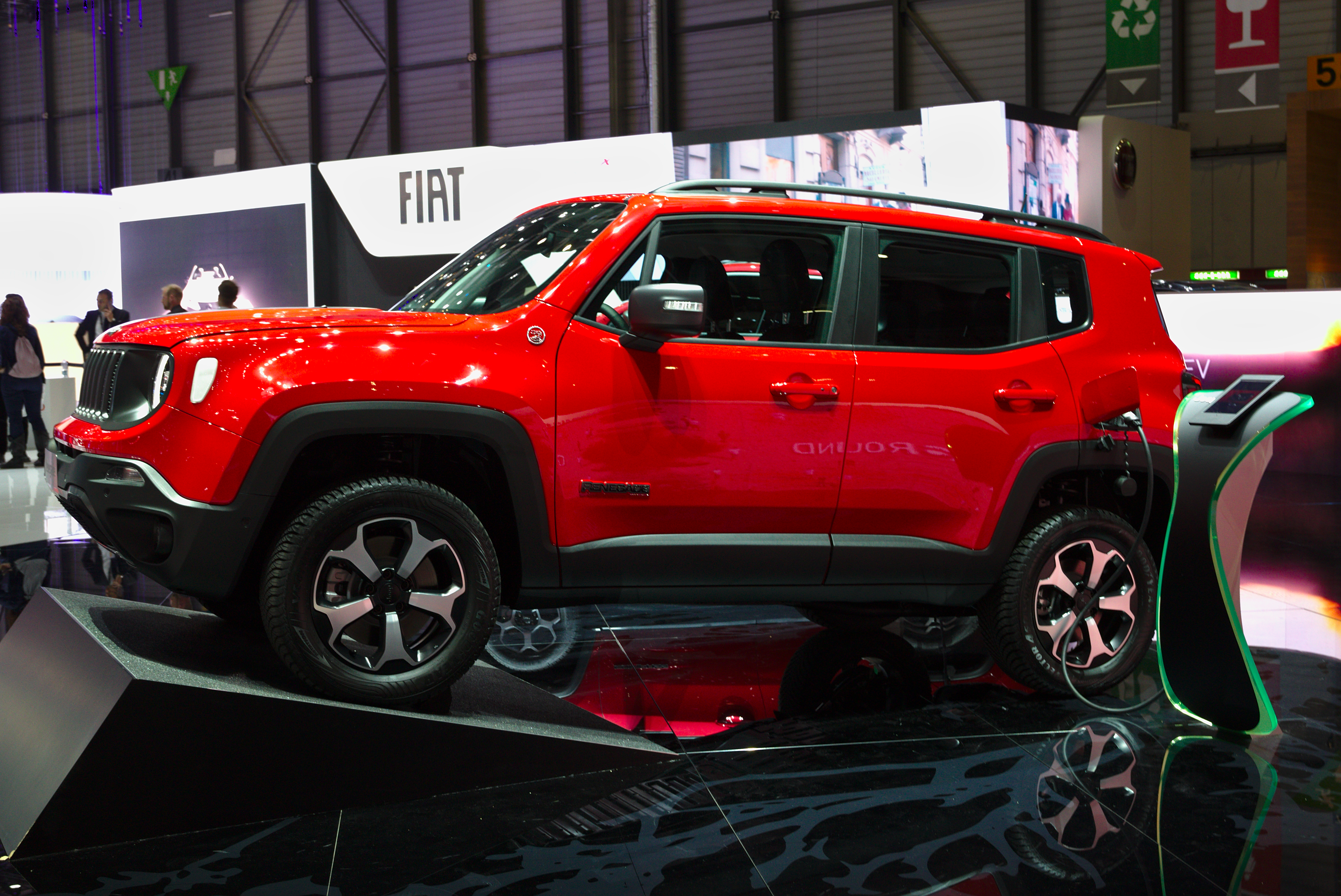
Renegade PHEV

In June 2018, the Renegade was updated with some slight aesthetic touches: the front and rear bumpers have been redesigned, new LED headlamps (their design is inspired by the ones used for the Wrangler) were adopted, and the front grille is larger.

The infotainment system was upgraded with a new, more up-to-date processor and a more generous display that varies from 7" to 8.4" in the navigator version. The displays are all multitouch and the customizable menus also offer the possibility to adjust the air conditioning. Android Auto and Apple CarPlay compatibility was introduced.

The Latitude version now also has a USB jack on the back of the armrest dedicated to passengers sitting in the rear seats.

The European version introduced the new gasoline engines of the Global Small Engine (FireFly) family produced by FCA Poland Powertrain in Bielsko-Biała (POLAND) in two versions: 1.0 L Turbo 3-cylinder 120 hp with direct injection, Multiair system and GPF filter, and 1.3 L Turbo Multiair with direct injection and GPF filter 110 kW (148 hp; 150 PS) and 132 kW (177 hp; 179 PS). The 1.0 L is available with a 5-speed manual transmission and front-wheel drive, the 1.3 L with a 6-speed manual transmission, a 6-speed automatic double clutch or a 9-speed ZF automatic with front or 4-wheel drive. The diesel engines introduced the SCR system and are approved Euro6D-Temp.

In September 2018, the facelifted Renegade was unveiled for the North American market (MY2019), which introduced the 1.3 L GSE Turbo Multiair engine with 132 kW (177 hp; 179 PS) as a replacement for the 1.4 L Fire Turbo Multiair, while the 2.4 L Tigershark engine remains available. The North American model has the same changes applied to the European model.

In October 2018, the updated version for the South American market produced by FCA of Goiana (Pernambuco) in Brazil was introduced and presents only aesthetic updates with the adoption for all versions of the Trailhawk bumpers; the front and rear headlamps remain those of the previous model. The engines for the South American market are the 1.8 L E.Torq Evo gasoline and the 2.0 L Multijet diesel.

=== 2022 changes ===
For 2022, all models receive a standard U Connect 4C 8.4-inch (8.4") touchscreen infotainment system, which includes SiriusXM Satellite Radio, SiriusXM Travel Link, and SiriusXM Guardian services, all with included trial subscriptions, as well as integrated GPS navigation and HD Radio. A new (RED) Edition, in partnership with Product Red, is also available.

For the base Sport trim, the Beige interior color option has been discontinued, and the Jeep Active Safety Group now comes as standard equipment on all Renegade models. Nineteen-inch (19") tires and diamond-cut aluminum-alloy wheels are now available on the Limited trim when equipped with the optional Sun, Sound, and Wheels Package, which adds a dual-pane power panoramic moonroof and a nine-speaker Alpine premium amplified surround-sound audio system with a subwoofer.

The 2.4 L engine option was discontinued for the US market.

=== 2023 changes ===
For 2023, the Renegade receives a refresh for the Brazilian market. Featuring revised front-end styling and a revised 1.3L "Turbo-Flex" Turbocharged Inline Four-Cylinder (I4) gasoline engine known as the "T270", the new model is also expected to debut for the rest of the world for the 2023 model year.

For 2023, in the US market, the entry level Sport trim and all front-wheel drive versions of the Renegade are dropped, thus making all-wheel drive standard across the board. Latitude is now the entry trim level on the Renegade, and Altitude, Trailhawk, and Limited remain available.

Also for the 2023 model year, the Latitude-based Upland trim returns to the lineup, adding Trailhawk-inspired exterior styling elements to the base Latitude model. The interior includes bronze stitching.

=== 2024 changes ===
The Renegade was discontinued in the US and Canada after the 2023 model year, following years of decreasing sales. It continues to be sold elsewhere, such as Europe, Mexico, and South America.

For 2024, the Renegade receives an array of updates. Changes include a larger 10.1" touchscreen with higher-resolution backup camera, larger 10.25" digital display cluster, and a new steering wheel sourced from the Compass. Android Auto and Apple CarPlay become standard and new USB-A and USB-C ports are added. On the exterior, the foglamps and taillamps are upgraded to LED units, and new 17" and 18" alloy wheels are introduced on higher trim levels.

Also for this year, only hybrid powertrains (e-Hybrid and 4xe) are available, with all ICE options dropped.

== Sales ==
Year	United States	Canada	Brazil	Europe	China	Argentina	Mexico
2014				7,768			
2015	60,946	2,261	39,187	53,940			
2016	106,606	2,629	51,567	76,203	26,294	2,746	
2017	103,434	3,015	31,566	72,578	24,796	6,463	3,486
2018	97,062	1,193	46,344	72,457	17,232	11,035	3,024
2019	76,886	664	68,726	78,842	5,640	7,000	2,513
2020	62,847	355	56,865	58,975	2,468	6,142	1,733
2021	47,131	295	73,913	62,981	1,040	7,078	3,376
2022	27,549	345	51,318			5,941	3,559
2023	26,012	295	47,399				
2024	8,440	84	53,879				
2025	721	7	44,801				
