= Fiat 500X =

Fiat crossover SUV

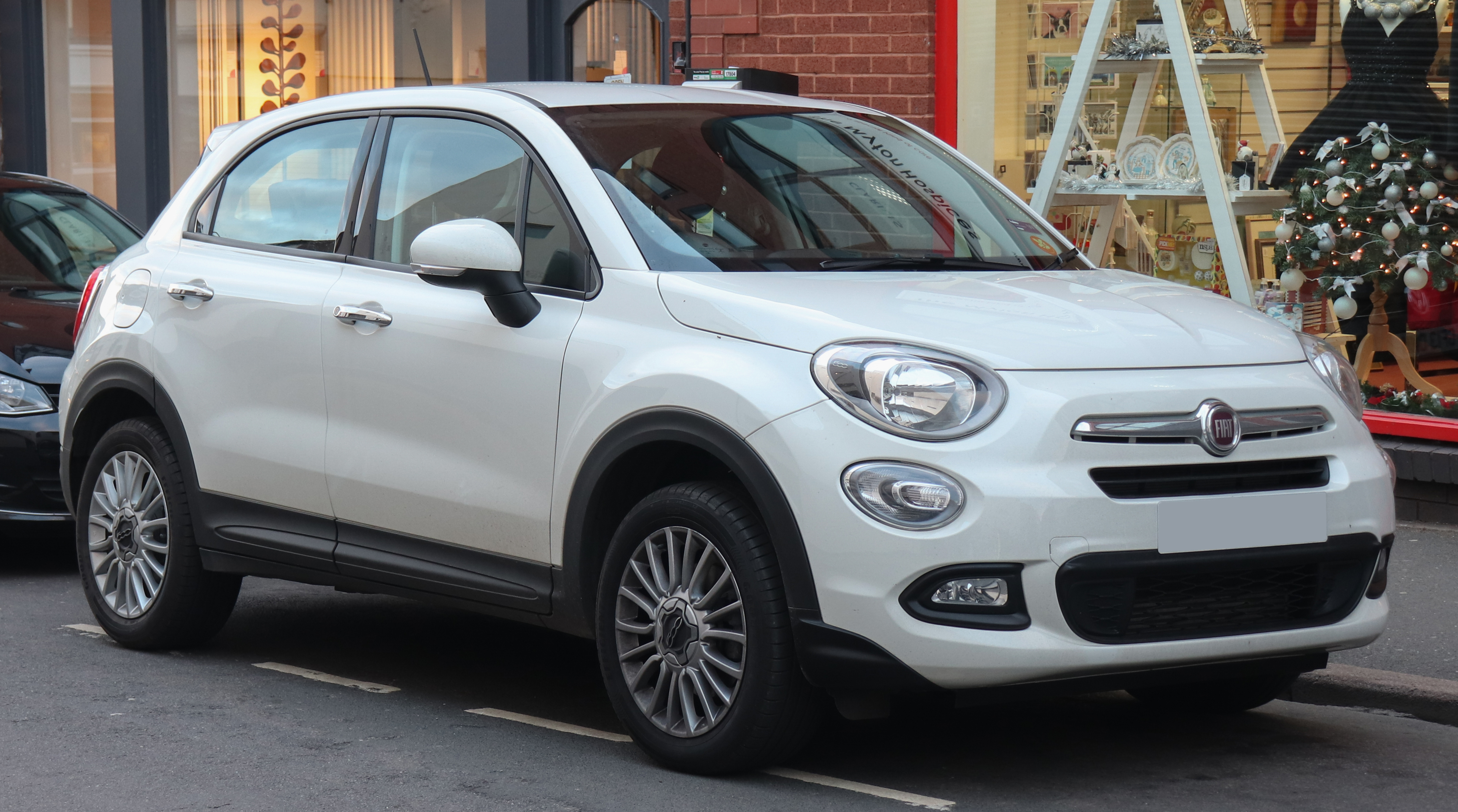

Overview
- Manufacturer: Fiat (Note: FCA Italy (2014–2021); Stellantis (2021–present))
- Production: 2014–2024
- Model years: 2015–2025
- Assembly: Italy: Melfi, Potenza (SATA)
- Designer: Danilo Tosetti, Antonella Pischedda, Fabio Ricupero and Dario Pellegrino under Roberto Giolito

Body and chassis
- Class: Subcompact crossover SUV (B)
- Body style: 5-door SUV
- Layout: Front-engine, front-wheel-drive or all-wheel-drive
- Platform: FCA Small Wide 4×4
- Related: Jeep Renegade; Fiat 500L; Jeep Compass; Fiat Toro

Powertrain
- Engine: Petrol: 1.0 L FireFly turbo I3; 1.3 L FireFly turbo I4; 1.4 L T-Jet MultiAir turbo I4; 1.6 L E.torq flexifuel I4; 2.4 L Tigershark I4; Diesel: 1.3 L Multijet II turbo I4; 1.6 L Fiat JTD engine#1.6 JTDm turbo I4; 2.0 L Fiat JTD engine#2.0 JTDm turbo I4; Hybrid: 1.5 L T4 mild hybrid I4
- Transmission: 5-speed FPT C510 manual; 6-speed FPT C635 manual; 6-speed FPT C635 DDCT dual-clutch; 9-speed Chrysler/ZF AT9X automatic
- Hybrid drivetrain: Mild Hybrid
- Battery: 0.8 kWh battery (Mild hybrid)

Dimensions
- Wheelbase: 2,570 mm (101.2 in)
- Length: 4,248 mm (167.2 in); 4,273 mm (168.2 in) (500X Cross)
- Width: 1,786 mm (70.3 in)
- Height: 1,600–1,620 mm (63.0–63.8 in)
- Kerb weight: 1,320–1,495 kg (2,910–3,296 lb)

Chronology
- Predecessor: Fiat Sedici

The Fiat 500X (Type 334) is a subcompact crossover SUV manufactured and marketed by Stellantis (formerly Fiat Chrysler Automobiles), since its debut at the 2014 Paris Motor Show. Following the 500L, and produced from 2014 (from 2016 model year for US) to 2024, the 500X is closely related to the Jeep Renegade. Both are manufactured at FCA's SATA Plant in Melfi, Italy.

== Specifications ==
The 500X is based on the Small Wide 4×4 architecture, a platform evolved from the GM Fiat Small platform used for the Fiat Grande Punto and Fiat 500L.

The Fiat 500X is available with several engines with optional all-wheel drive with most. At launch, engines available outside of North America included: one gasoline, the turbocharged 1.4 MultiAir2, and two MultiJet turbodiesels displacing 1.6 and 2.0 litres.

In North America, the Fiat 500X features:

- A 1.4-litre turbocharged four-cylinder engine, with a six-speed manual transmission available only with front-wheel drive.
- A naturally aspirated 2.4-litre four-cylinder engine, with a nine-speed automatic with standard front-wheel drive and optional with all-wheel drive.

In 2022, Fiat added the 1.5 L Firefly mild hybrid, with a 48 Volt belt alternator starter electric motor to assist the engine. This is paired with a 0.8kWh battery.

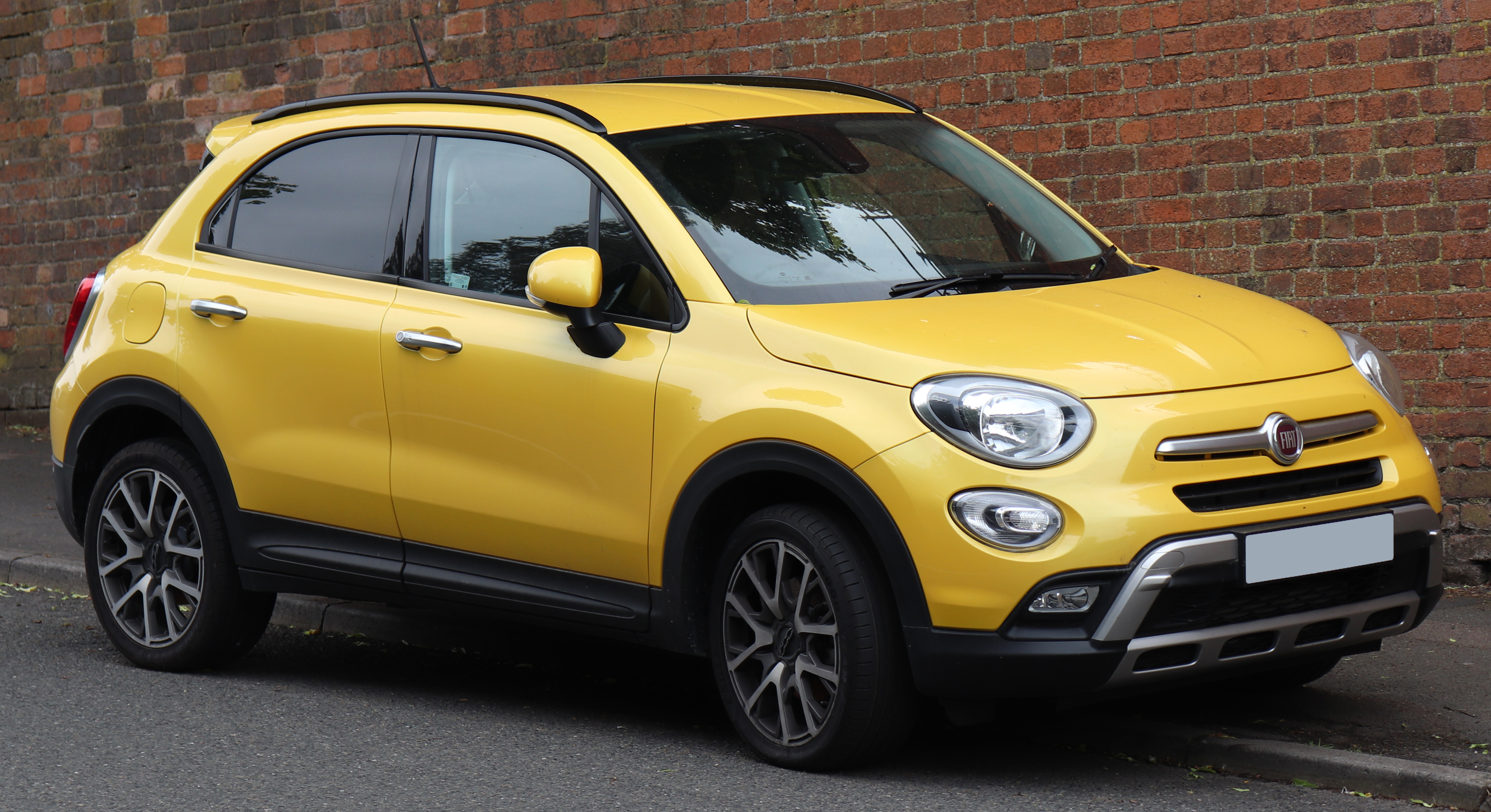
2017 Fiat 500X Cross+

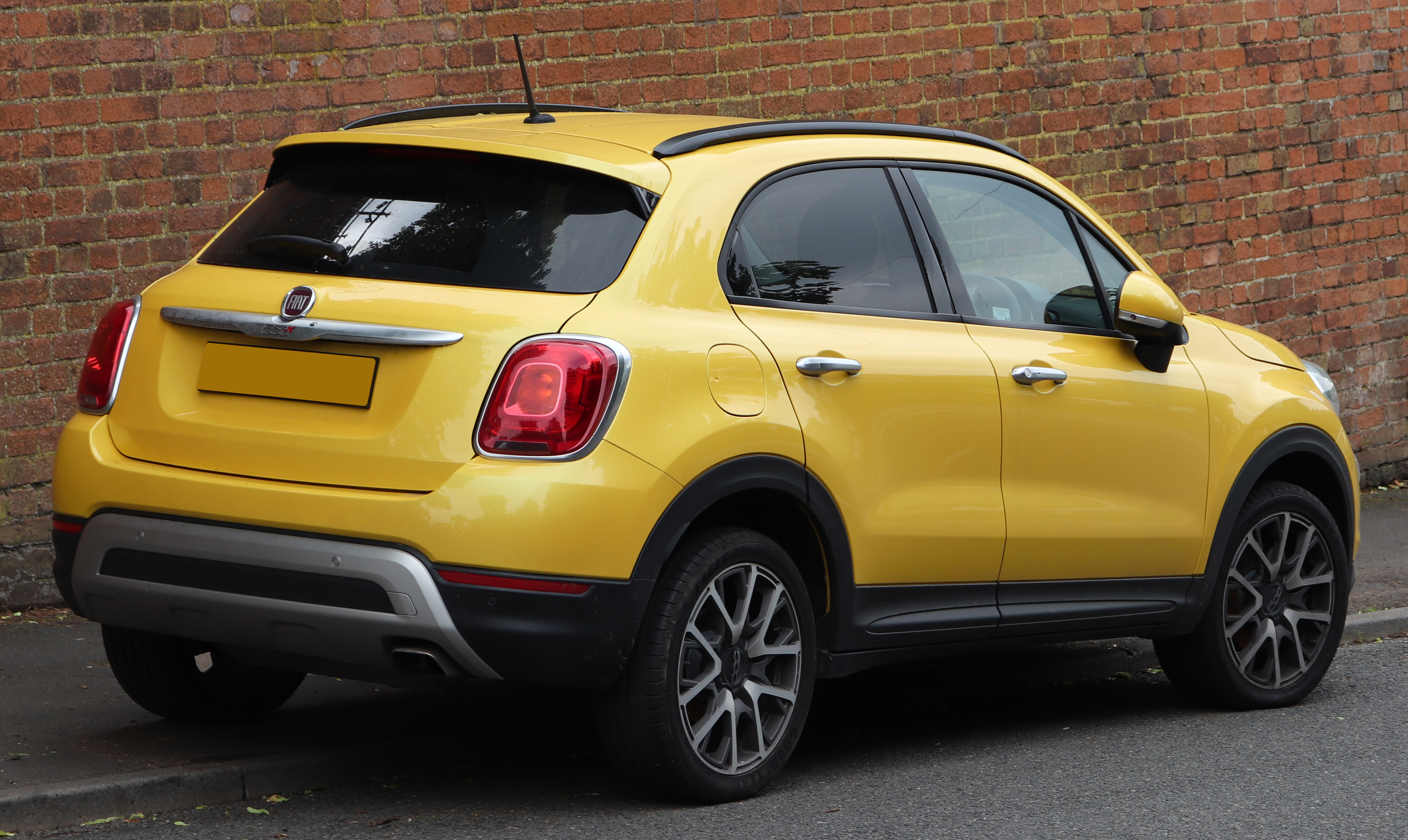
2017 Fiat 500X Cross+

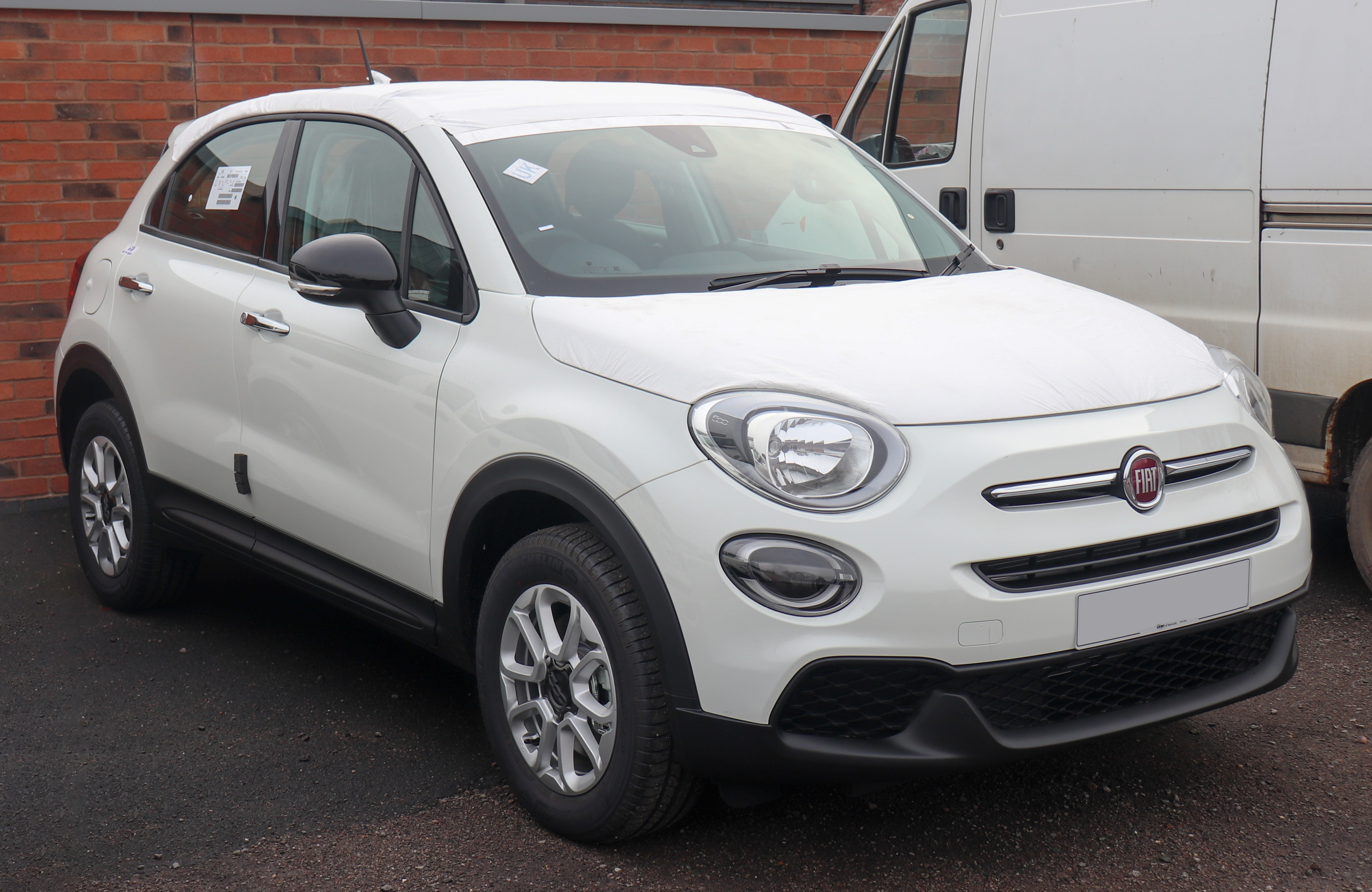
2018 Fiat 500X Urban Look

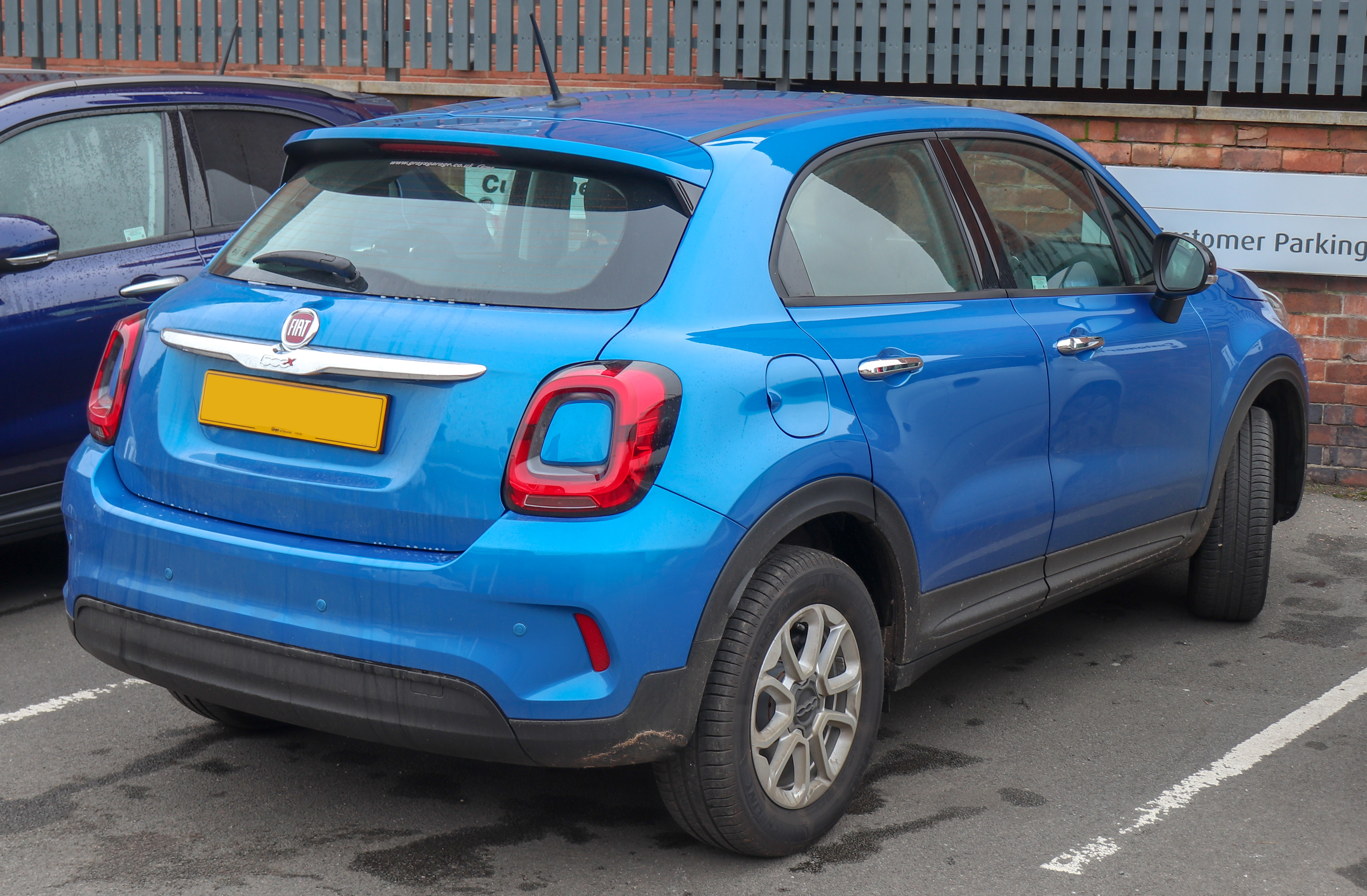
2018 Fiat 500X Urban Look

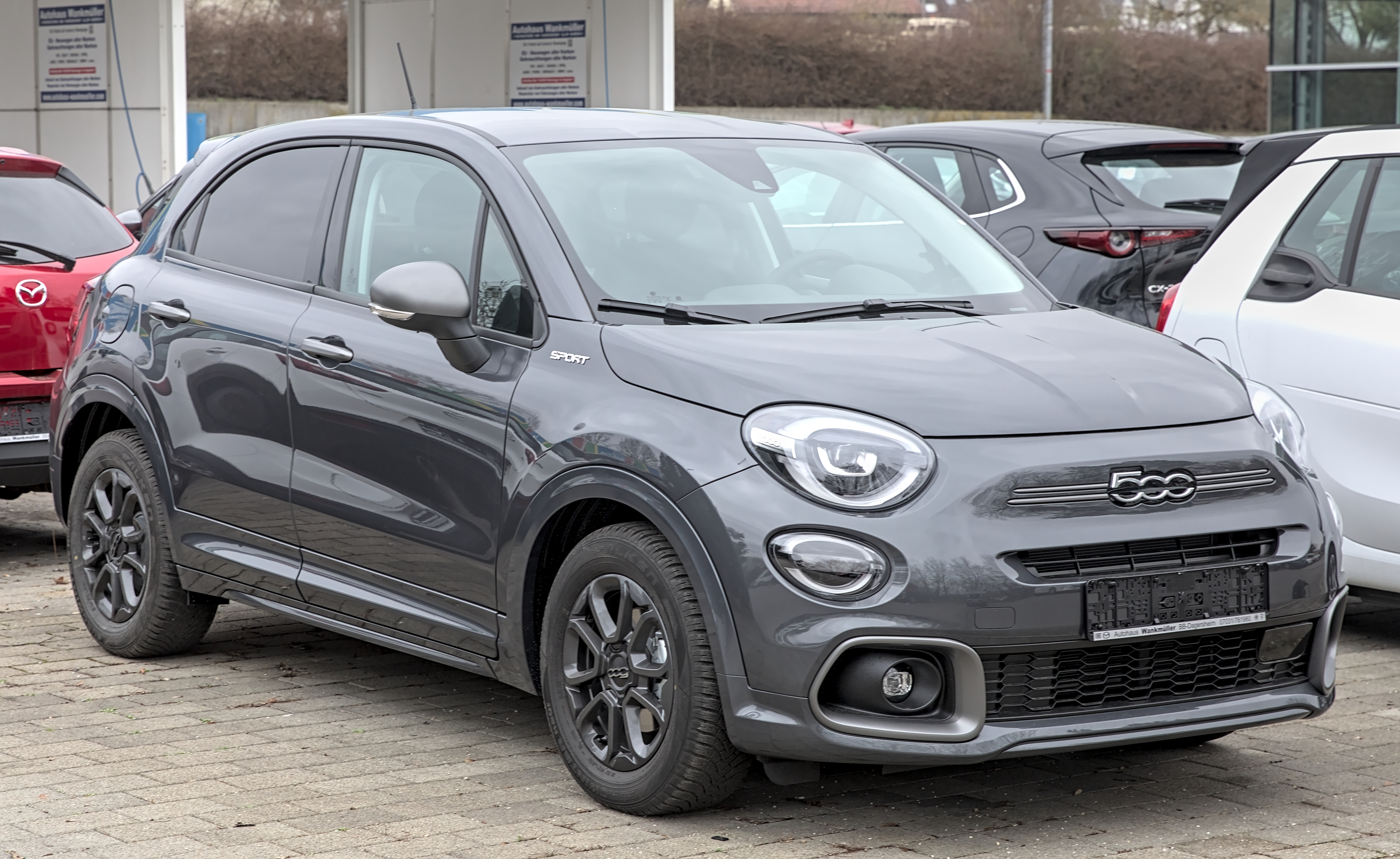
2022 Fiat 500X Sport

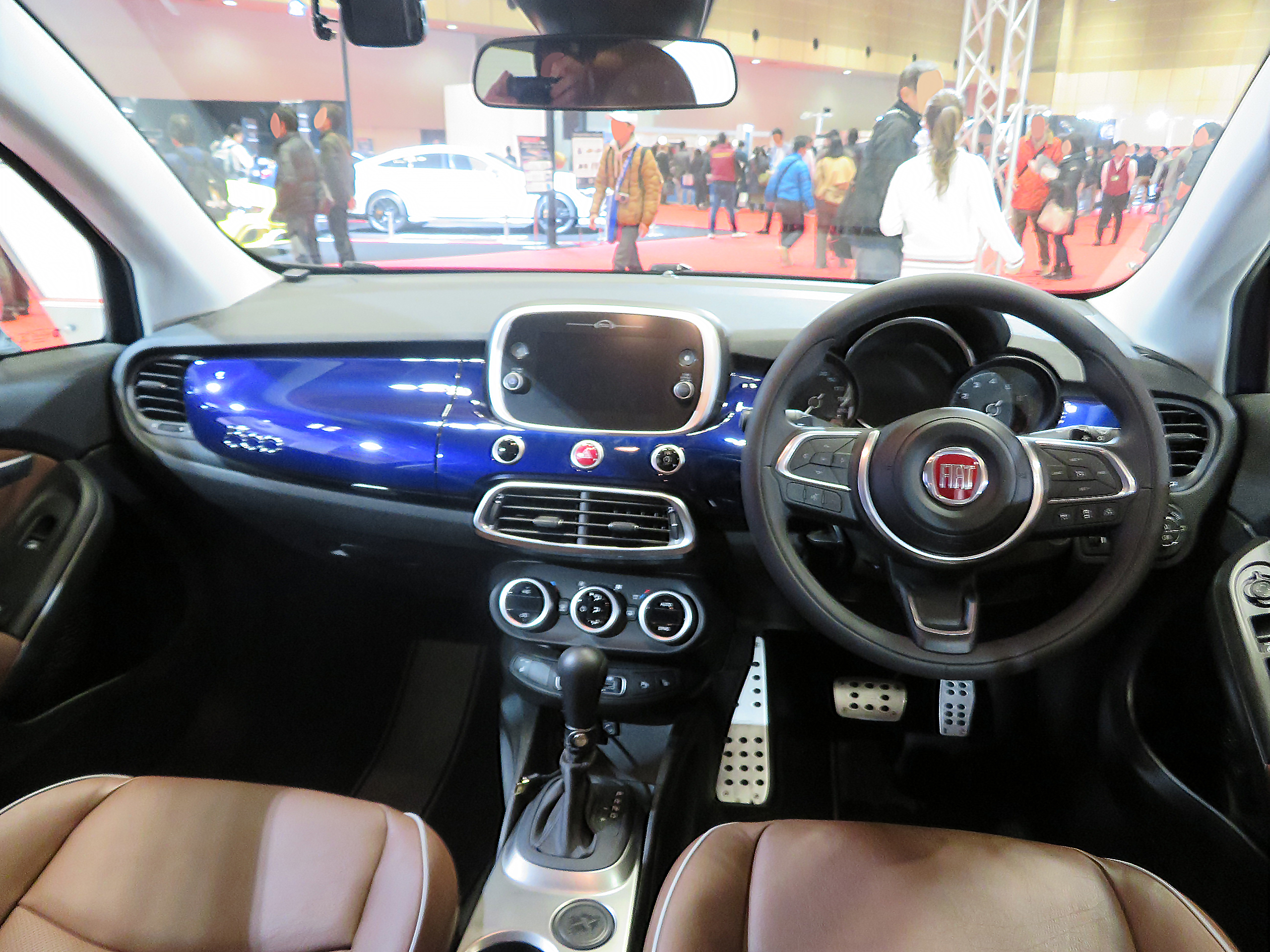
RHD Interior

=== Engines ===
Engine	Year of introduction	Type	Displacement	Power at rpm	Torque at rpm	CO_{2} emissions	0–100 km/h (0–62 mph)	Top speed
1.0 MultiAir	2019, from redesign launch	I3 turbocharged gasoline, DOHC 12 valve	999 cc	120 PS (88 kW; 118 hp) at 5,750	190 N⋅m (140 lb⋅ft) at 1,750		s	200 km/h (120 mph)
1.3 MultiAir II	2019, from redesign launch	I4 turbocharged gasoline, DOHC 16 valve	1332 cc	150 PS (110 kW; 148 hp) at 5,500	270 N⋅m (199 lbf⋅ft) at 1,850	139 g/km	s	
1.4 MultiAir II	2014, from launch	I4 turbocharged gasoline, SOHC 16 valve	1368 cc	140 PS (103 kW; 138 hp) at 5,000	230 N⋅m (170 lbf⋅ft) at 1,750	139 g/km	9.8 s	190 km/h (120 mph)
1.4 MultiAir	2015, from launch	I4 turbocharged gasoline, SOHC 16 valve	1368 cc	162 PS (119 kW; 160 hp) at 5,500	249 N⋅m (184 lb⋅ft) at 2,500		8.6 s	200 km/h (120 mph)
1.6 Fiat E.torQ	2015, from launch	I4 gasoline, SOHC 16 valve	1368 cc	110 PS (81 kW; 108 hp) at 5,500	152 N⋅m (112 lb⋅ft) at 4,500		s	
1.6 MultiJet II	2019, from redesign launch	I4 turbocharged diesel, DOHC 16 valve	1598 cc	120 PS (88 kW; 118 hp) at 3,750	320 N⋅m (236 lbf⋅ft) at 1,750	109 g/km	10.5 s	186 km/h (116 mph)
2.0 MultiJet II 140	2014, from launch	I4 turbocharged diesel, DOHC 16 valve	1956 cc	140 PS (103 kW; 138 hp) at 4,000	350 N⋅m (258 lbf⋅ft) at 1,750	144 g/km	9.8 s	190 km/h (120 mph)
2.4 Chrysler Tigershark MultiAir II	2015, from launch	I4 gasoline, SOHC 16 valve	2360 cc	182 PS (130 kW; 180 hp) at 6,250	237 N⋅m (175 lb⋅ft) at 4,400		s	
1.5 FireFly T4 - GSE (Global Small Engine)	2022, from restyling	T4 turbocharged gasoline/electric (mini Full-Hybrid)	1469 cc	95,6 Kw + e-motor in the 7-speed automatic transmission DCT	240Nm	122g/Km	9.4	

=== Powertrain ===
Engine	Power	Transmission	Year	Regions
Fiat 1.0 L I3 T3	88 kW (118 hp; 120 PS)	6 speed FPT C635 manual	2019–2023	Europe
Fiat 1.3 L I4 T4	110 kW (148 hp; 150 PS)	6 speed FPT C635 DDCT dual-clutch	2019–2024	Europe
Fiat 1.3 L I4 T4	132 kW (177 hp; 179 PS)	9 speed Chrysler 948TE automatic	2019–2024	North America
Fiat 1.4 L I4 FIRE MultiAir2 Turbo	103 kW (138 hp; 140 PS)	6 speed Fiat C635 manual	2014–2024	Europe
Fiat 1.4 L I4 FIRE MultiAir Turbo	119 kW (160 hp; 162 PS)	6 speed Fiat C635 manual	2015–2024	North America
Fiat 1.4 L I4 FIRE MultiAir Turbo	119 kW (160 hp; 162 PS)	9 speed Chrysler 948TE automatic	2015–2024	Europe
Chrysler-Mitsubishi 2.4 L I4 Tigershark MultiAir2	134 kW (180 hp; 182 PS)	9 speed Chrysler 948TE automatic	2015–2018	North America
Fiat-(Chrysler/BMW) Brazil 1.6 L I4 E.torQ	81 kW (109 hp; 110 PS)	5 speed Fiat C510 manual	2015–2024	Europe
Fiat 1.6 L I4 MultiJet2	88 kW (118 hp; 120 PS)	6 speed Fiat C635 manual	2014–2024	Europe
Fiat 2.0 L I4 MultiJet2	103 kW (138 hp; 140 PS)	6 speed Fiat C635 manual	2014–2024	Europe
Fiat 2.0 L I4 MultiJet2	103 kW (138 hp; 140 PS)	9 speed Chrysler 948TE automatic	2014–2024	Europe

== Trim levels ==
In the United States, FCA originally offered the Fiat 500X in Pop, Easy, Lounge, Trekking, and Trekking Plus trim levels — with optional all wheel drive on all but Pop trim level. In Europe, it comes in Pop, Pop Star, Lounge, Cross, Cross Plus and Sport trims, with the all wheel drive available only on the 2.0L Multijet diesel, and the higher powered gasoline versions with automatic gearboxes.

== Safety ==
The 500X has ventilated front disc brakes and solid ones in the rear.

=== ANCAP ===
ANCAP test results Fiat 500X (2016)
Test	Score
Overall	5 /5 stars
Frontal offset	15.12/16
Side impact	16/16
Pole	2/2
Seat belt reminders	3/3
Whiplash protection	Good
Pedestrian protection	Adequate
Electronic stability control	Standard

=== Latin NCAP ===
The Italian-made 500X in its most basic Latin American market configuration with 6 airbags and ESC received 5 stars for adult occupants, 5 stars for toddlers, and Advanced Award from Latin NCAP 2.0 in 2018.

Latin NCAP 2.0 test results Fiat 500X + 6 Airbags (2018, based on Euro NCAP 2008)
Test	Points	Stars
Adult occupant:	32.55/34.0	5 /5 stars
Child occupant:	43.13/49.00	5 /5 stars

=== Euro NCAP ===
The 500X in its standard European market configuration received 4 stars from Euro NCAP in 2015.

=== IIHS ===
The Insurance Institute for Highway Safety named the 2016 Fiat 500X small crossover a 2015 Top Safety Pick+, its highest rating.

IIHS scores (2016):
Small overlap front (Driver)	Good	
Moderate overlap front	Good	
Side (original test)	Good	
Roof strength	Good	
Head restraints and seats	Good	
Headlights	Poor	
Front crash prevention (Vehicle-to-Vehicle)	Advanced	optional
Child seat anchors (LATCH) ease of use	Marginal	

== Sales ==
Year	Europe	Italy	France	U.S.	Canada
2014	135				
2015	74,262	32,579	11,644	9,463	609
2016	104,931	46,233	8,353	12,599	766
2017	90,049	45,789	13,060	7,665	856
2018	94,960	49,931	15,055	5,223	79
2019	89,361	42,554	1,325	2,519	50
2020	58,853	31,831	7,325	1,444	35
2021	53,826	31,982	5,946	1,180	16
2022	32,153	22,244		463	
2023		27,902		552	
2024		11,278		560	
2025				129	
