= FPT C635 DDCT transmission =

Six-speed dual-dry-clutch automatic transmission

The C635 DDCT is a six-speed, dual-dry-clutch automatic transmission developed jointly by FPT Industrial, Magneti Marelli and BorgWarner, and is manufactured by FPT at the Verrone, Italy plant. The transmission utilizes a control system produced by Magneti Marelli which integrates BorgWarner's hydraulic actuation module into its own power and transmission control units. It is marketed variously under the trade names TCT - Twin Clutch Transmission (Alfa Romeo), Euro Twin Clutch Transmission (Fiat USA), TCSS - The Twin Clutch System (Suzuki) and Dual-Dry-Clutch Auto Transmission (Dodge).

Able to receive torque inputs of up to 350 N⋅m (260 lbf⋅ft), the transmission is the highest-torque transverse dual-dry-clutch application.(2012) It weighs 81 kg (179 lb), including oil and transmission control unit.

== Applications ==
- Alfa Romeo Tonale
- Alfa Romeo 4C
- Alfa Romeo MiTo
- Alfa Romeo Giulietta
- Dodge Dart
- Dodge Hornet
- Fiat 500L
- Fiat 500X
- Fiat Tipo (2015)
- Fiat Viaggio
- Jeep Renegade
- Suzuki SX4
- Suzuki Vitara

== C725 7 speed ==
The C725 is a 7-speed version developed for engines up to 250 N⋅m (180 lbf⋅ft) of maximum torque and intended only for front-wheel-drive vehicles and transverse engines and is produced in China by the GAC Fiat joint-venture. Three FCA models currently have this transmission as an option, the Fiat Ottimo, the Fiat Viaggio, and the Alfa Romeo Tonale. The Fiat models are produced and sold only in China.

- Fiat Ottimo
- Fiat Viaggio
- Alfa Romeo Tonale
- Jeep Compass
