= FPT Industrial =

Italian powertrains and transmissions manufacturing company

FPT
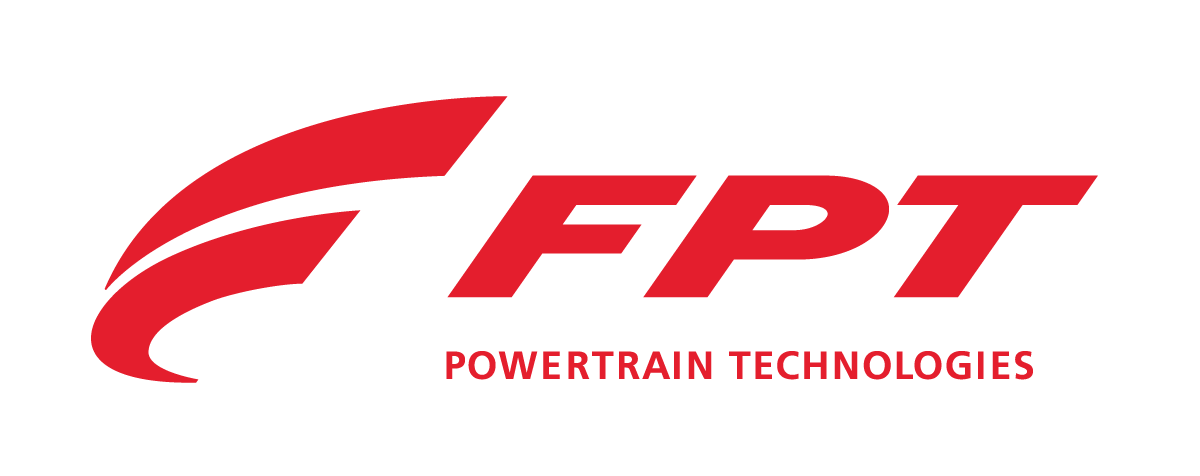
- Type: Subsidiary
- Industry: Automotive
- Founded: Turin, Italy (2005)
- Headquarters: Turin, Italy
- Products: engines, transmissions and powertrains
- Number of employees: 20,500 (February 2009)
- Parent: Iveco Group
- Website: www.fptindustrial.com

FPT is an Italian multinational designer and manufacturer of transmissions, axles, diesel and petrol engines that was established in March 2005 as a Fiat Group division which included all the activities related to powertrains and transmissions. The company was formed following the dissolution of the alliance between Fiat and General Motors.

Between 2005 and 2011, the company also included industrial and commercial powertrain activities that were subsequently spun off as a separate entity named FPT, which is currently an Iveco Group brand.

In 2022, FPT announced acquisition of minority stake in Indian alternate fuel powered commercial vehicle manufacturer Blue Energy Motors. Blue Energy Motors launched India's first LNG HCV which had FPT powertrain. The same FPT N67 engine was also used in the New Holland T7 concept tractor.

The company has activities in nine countries, it has 10 plants and around 20,000 employees. With output of around 2.9 million engines and 2.4 million transmissions and axles annually, FPT is one of the largest companies in the powertrain sector.

== FPT innovations ==
- Variable Valve Timing (1960). First patent of automotive variable valve timing
- Common Rail technology (1996). Patent sold to Robert Bosch later
- MultiJet system (2003)
- MultiAir technology (2009)
- TwinAir two-cylinder engine (2010)
- Euro Twin Clutch Transmission (2010)

== Current status ==
As a result of partial and proportional demerger of Fiat S.p.A. to Fiat Industrial S.p.A., Fiat Powertrain Technologies S.p.A. was split into Fiat Powertrain and FPT S.p.A. on January 1, 2011.

FPT S.p.A. is now part of Iveco Group and produces powertrains for On-Road, Off-Road, Marine and Power Generation applications.

== See also ==
- List of Italian companies
