= SCCS =

SCCS may refer to any of the following:

== Science and technology ==
- Source Code Control System, a method of controlling software versions
- Switching Control Center System, an Operations Support System used by telephone companies from the 1970s to 1990s
- Standard cross-cultural sample, an ethnographic dataset widely used in Cross-cultural studies
- Scottish Centre for Carbon Storage, a consortium researching Carbon Storage based in Edinburgh, Scotland
- Standard Cost Coding System, a coding standard developed by Norwegian Oil & Gas Companies to standardize reporting formats
- Standard Cubic Centimeter per Second, a measure of gas throughput or leakage rate
- Scientific Committee on Consumer Safety, a scientific committee in the EU providing opinions on health and safety risks of consumer products and services
- Shipboard Command and Control System, a network of computers including large screen displays and a dedicated satellite network for communications. Installed on United States Coast Guard High Endurance Cutters

== Organizations ==
- Saint Croix Catholic School, an elementary school in Stillwater, MN
- Smith College Campus School, a private elementary lab school run by Smith College
- Santhigiri College of Computer Sciences, India
- Student Conference on Conservation Science, an international conference for students involved with wildlife conservation
- Swarthmore College Computer Society, a campus society at Swarthmore College
- Santa Clarita Christian School, a private K-12 school
- Sioux Center Christian School, a private K-8 school
- Stop Climate Chaos Scotland, a coalition of Scottish organisations aiming to reverse human-made climate change
- Southern California Computer Society
- Southern Colorado Computer Solutions Inc., biggest computer service center in Southern Colorado
- Sports Car Club of Siouxland, a performance driving organization based out of Sioux Fall South Dakota that focuses on mainly running NASA (National Auto Sports Association) sanctioned autocross events as well as HPDE days and doing work with local charities and veterans associations.

== Transportation ==
- Small Common Components and Systems, an automobile platform developed by Fiat S.p.A. and General Motors

== See also ==
- SCC (disambiguation)
