= Campus School =

Campus School may refer to one of many schools located at campuses of universities:

India

- Campus School, GBPUA&T, in Pantnagar, Uttarakhand
- Campus School, CCS HAU, in Hisar, Haryana
- Campus School, IIT Powai, in Powai, Maharashtra
- Campus School, IIT Kanpur, in Kanpur, Uttar Pradesh
- Campus School, in Ghaziabad, Uttar Pradesh
- Campus School, Madras Christian College, in Madras, Tamil Nadu
- Campus School, BPS Women's University, in Sonipat, Haryana
- Campus School, MDU, in Rohtak, Haryana
- Campus School, University of Hyderabad, in Hyderabad, Andhra Pradesh
- Campus School, CSJMU in Kanpur, Uttar Pradesh

USA

- Discovery Canyon Campus School, in Colorado Springs, Colorado
- David Lipscomb Campus School, in Nashville, Tennessee
- University Park Campus School, in Worcester, Massachusetts,
- Smith College Campus School, in Northampton, Massachusetts
- The Campus School of Carlow University, in Pittsburgh, Pennsylvania
