= Fiat B-platform =

Overview
- Manufacturer: Fiat Group
- Also called: Fiat 176 platform Fiat 178 platform Fiat 188 platform Type B
- Production: 1993-2021

Body and chassis
- Class: B-segment platform
- Layout: Front-engine, front-wheel drive
- Vehicles: See below

Chronology
- Predecessor: Fiat Tipo Uno
- Successor: SCCS platform

The Fiat B-platform was a front-wheel drive automobile platform used in superminis from the Fiat Group.

It was succeeded by the Fiat SCCS platform.

== Vehicles ==
- Fiat Albea 2002-2012
- Fiat Barchetta 1995-2005
- Fiat Idea 2003-2012
- Fiat Palio 1996-2020
- Fiat Punto 1993-2005
- Fiat Doblo 2000-2021
- Fiat Siena 1996-2016
- Fiat Strada 1998-2021
- Lancia Musa 2004-2012
- Lancia Ypsilon 1995-2011
- Zastava 10 2006-2008
