= Jeep Commander (2022) =

Brazilian/Indian mid-size crossover SUV

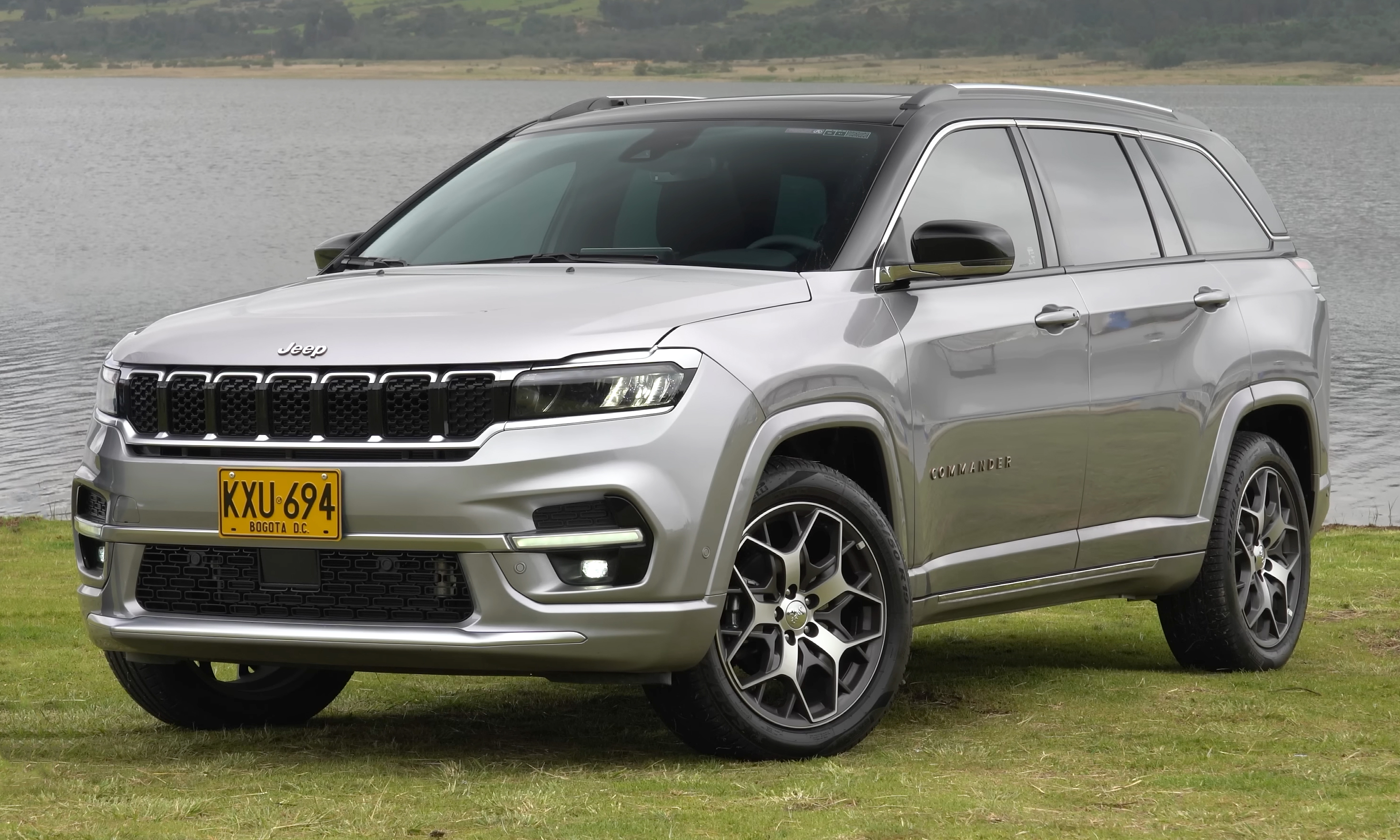
- 2023 Jeep Commander Overland (Colombia)

Overview
- Manufacturer: Jeep
- Also called: Jeep Meridian (India)
- Production: 2021–present
- Model years: 2022–present
- Assembly: Brazil: Goiana, Pernambuco; India: Ranjangaon, Maharashtra (FIAPL)

Body and chassis
- Class: Mid-size crossover SUV (D)
- Body style: 5-door SUV
- Layout: Front-engine, front-wheel drive or all-wheel drive
- Platform: FCA Small Wide 4×4 LWB
- Chassis: Unibody
- Related: Jeep Compass (second generation); Ram Rampage

Powertrain
- Engine: Petrol: 1.3 L GSE T4 I4 turbo; 2.0 L GME T4 Hurricane I4 turbo; Diesel: 2.0 L Multijet II I4 turbo
- Transmission: 6-speed Aisin AW60T automatic; 9-speed ZF 948TE automatic

Dimensions
- Wheelbase: 2,794 mm (110.0 in)
- Length: 4,769 mm (187.8 in)
- Width: 1,859 mm (73.2 in)
- Height: 1,682 mm (66.2 in)
- Curb weight: 1,658–1,908 kg (3,655–4,206 lb)

The Jeep Commander, also known as the Jeep Meridian in India, is a mid-size crossover SUV produced by Jeep since 2021. Based on the second-generation Compass, the vehicle is lengthened to accommodate three-row seating. It is mainly offered in emerging markets such as Latin America and India, but is also marketed in Japan. The vehicle was introduced in Brazil in August 2021 and in India in April 2022. The Commander/Meridian is positioned above the Compass.

== Specifications ==
Debuted on 27 August 2021 in Brazil, the Commander is built on the Small Wide global platform shared with the Compass. As a result, it is unrelated to the similarly named Grand Commander sold in China. During its introduction, it is claimed to be the only D-segment SUV produced in Brazil. The vehicle is longer by 365 mm (14.4 in) in length, and longer by 158 mm (6.2 in) in wheelbase compared to the Compass. The trunk volume of the Commander is 661 liters with the 5 seats up, 233 liters with the 7 seats in use, or 1,760 liters when the second and third row seats are fully folded down.

In Brazil, it is available with a 1.3-litre turboflex petrol engine marketed as "T270" which produces 185 PS (182 hp; 136 kW) and 27.5 m⋅kgf (270 N⋅m; 199 lb⋅ft), which is only optioned with front-wheel drive and 6-speed automatic transmission. A 2.0-litre turbodiesel engine marketed as "TD380" is available, and produces 170 PS (168 hp; 125 kW) and 38.7 m⋅kgf (380 N⋅m; 280 lb⋅ft) with all-wheel drive and a 9-speed automatic transmission as standard.

In India, the vehicle was introduced in April 2022 and launched on 19 May 2022 as the Meridian. Production started in early May 2022. Only one engine option is available, which is the 2.0-litre turbodiesel engine.

The Commander went on sale in Japan in October 2022. It is imported from India.

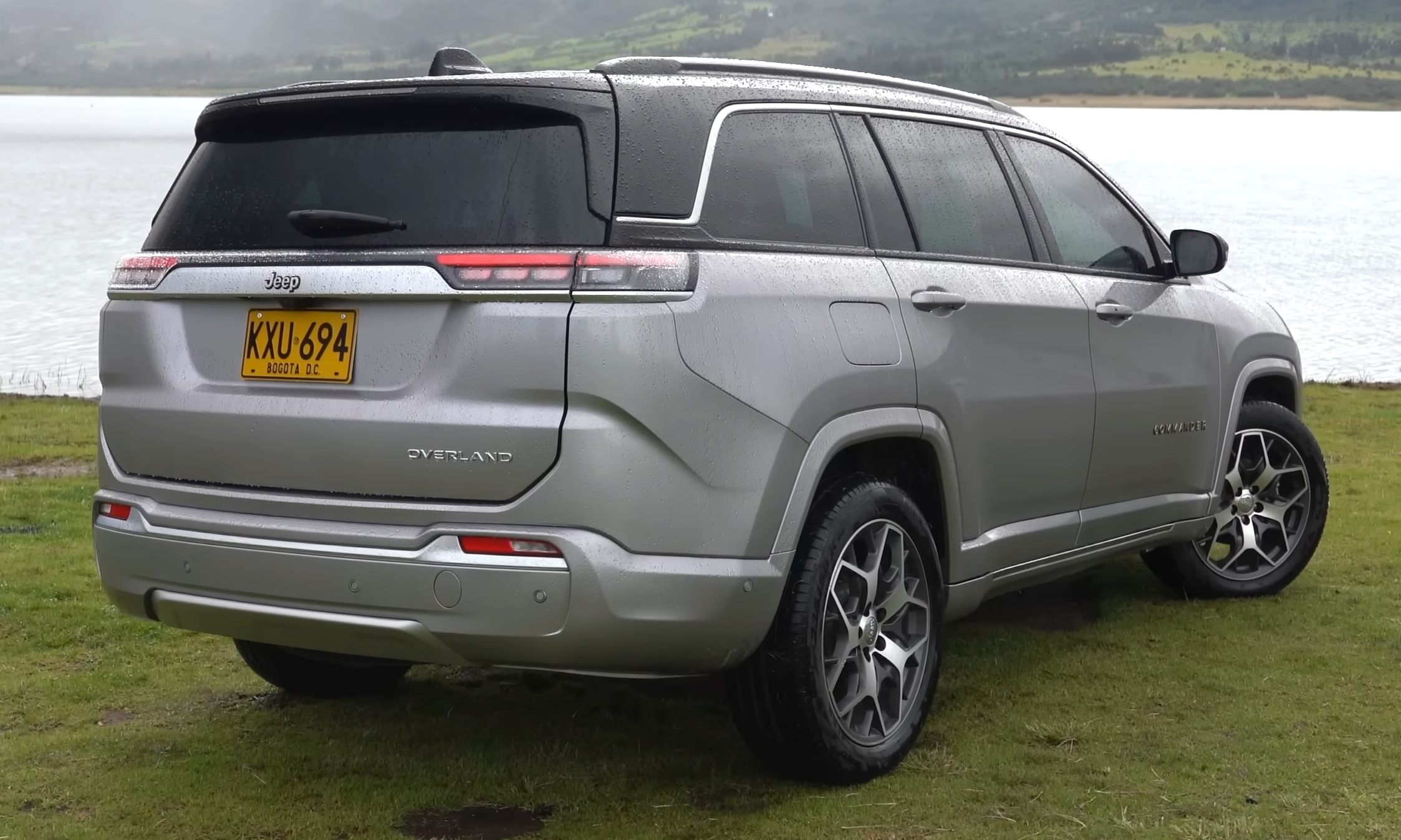
Rear view

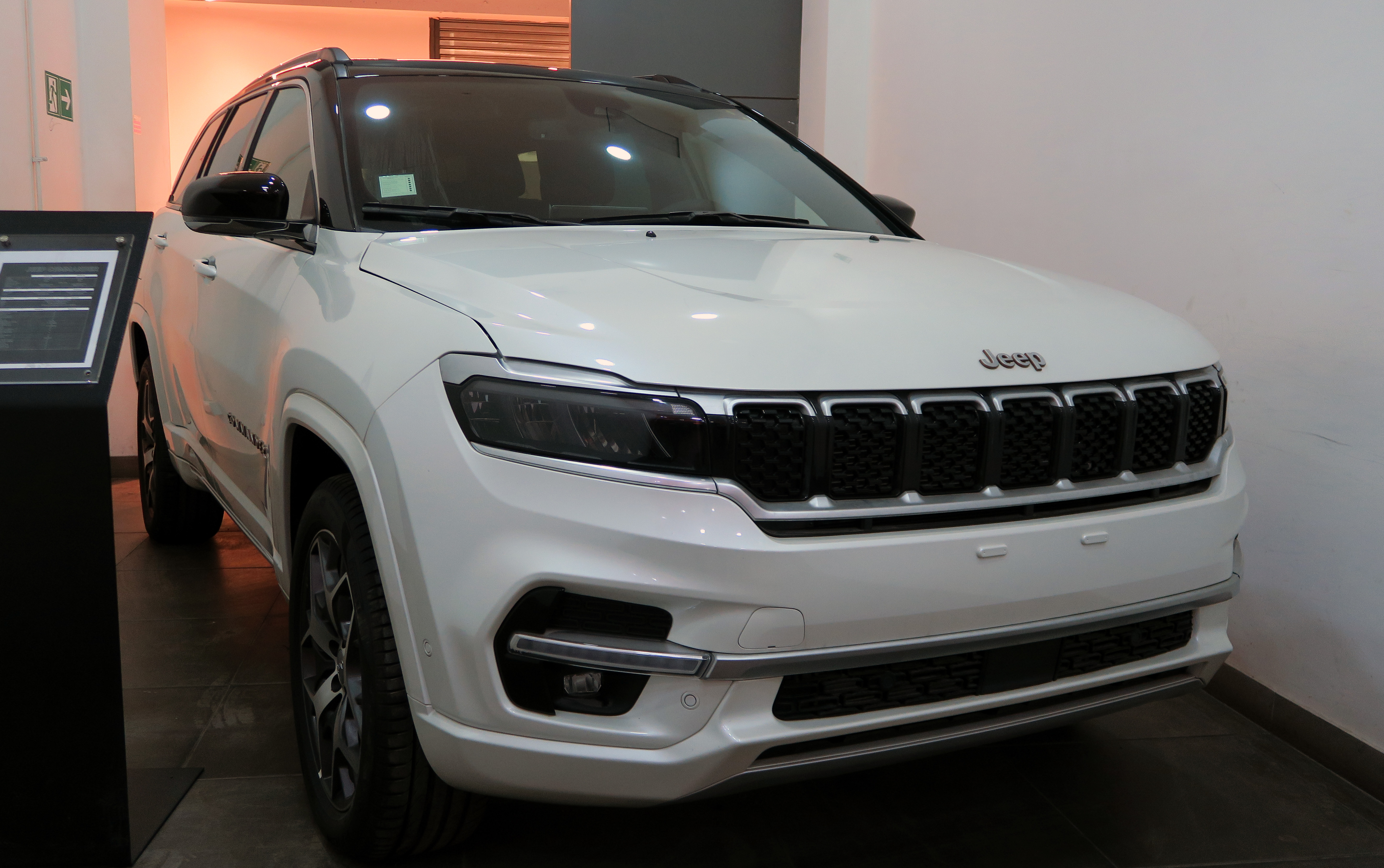
Jeep Commander Overland

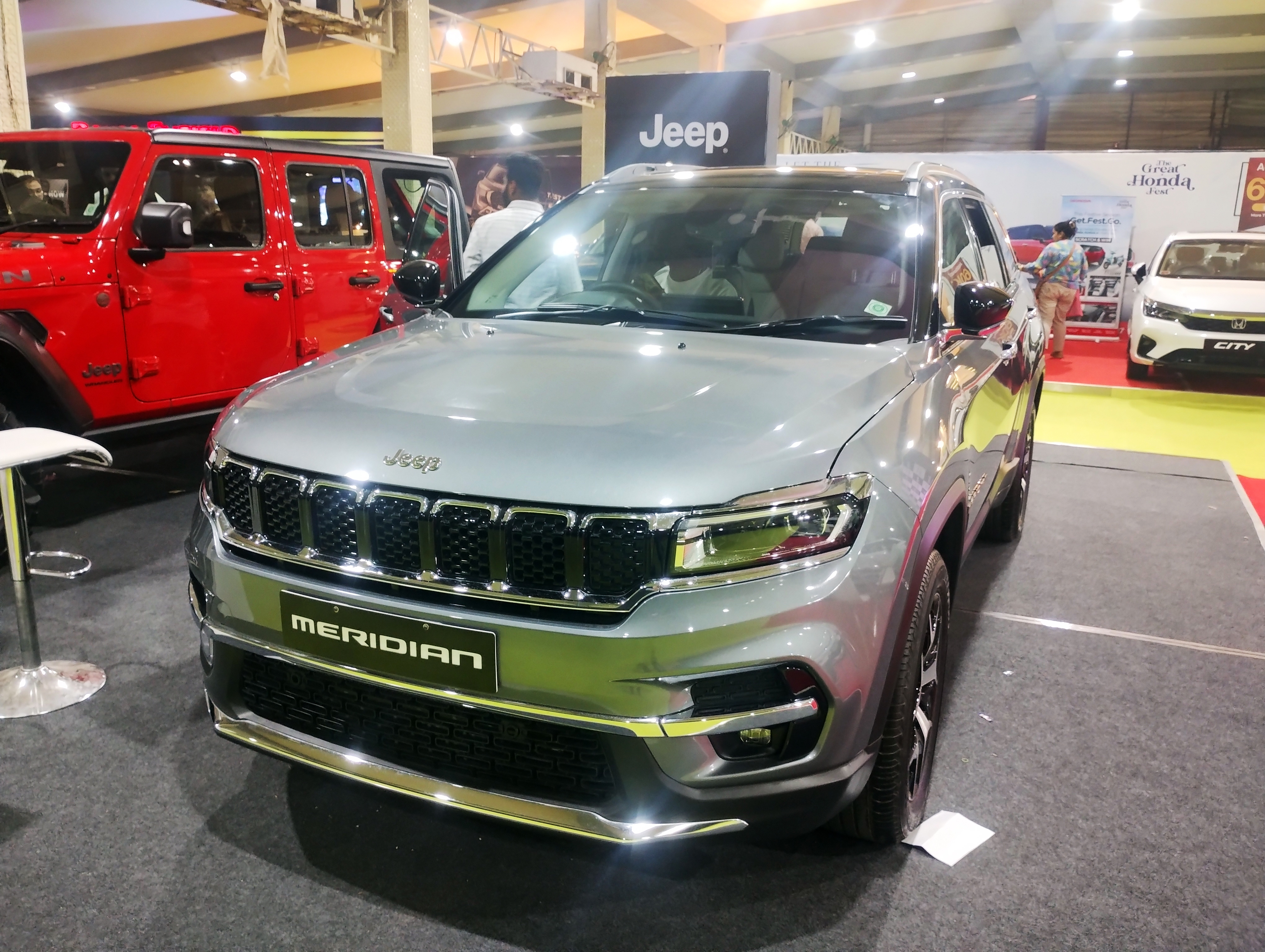
Jeep Meridian (India)

== Sales ==
Year	Brazil
2021	3,715
2022	22,311
2023	19,889
2024	16,739
2025	17,790
