= Fiat Toro =

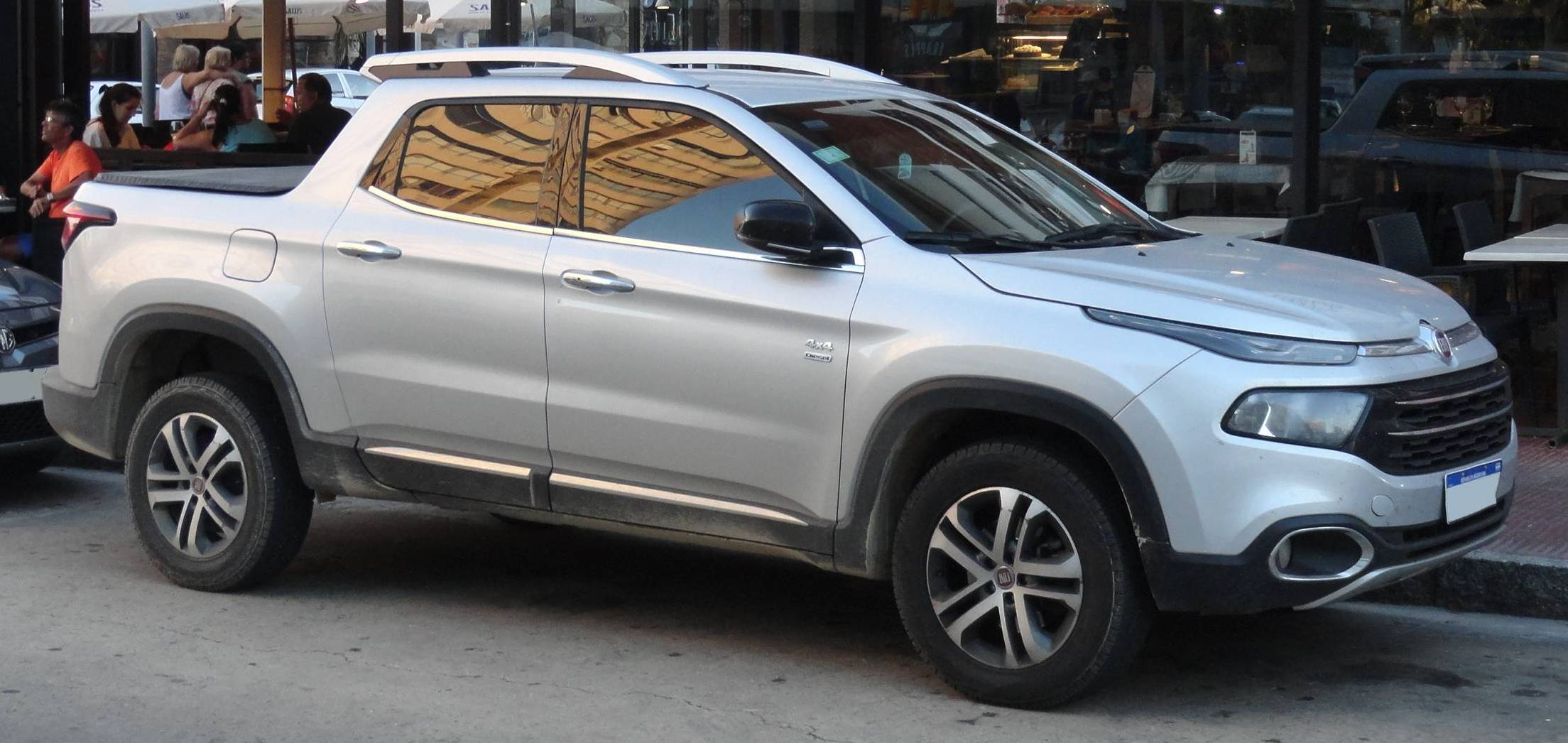

Overview
- Manufacturer: Fiat (Note: Fiat Chrysler Automobiles (2016–2021); Stellantis (2021–present))
- Also called: Ram 1000 (Colombia, Panama, Peru and Chile)
- Production: 2016–present
- Assembly: Brazil: Goiana, Pernambuco (FCA Brasil)

Body and chassis
- Class: Compact pickup truck
- Body style: 4-door pickup
- Layout: Front-engine, front-wheel-drive or all-wheel-drive
- Platform: Small Wide 4×4 LWB
- Chassis: Unibody
- Related: Ram Rampage; Fiat 500L; Fiat 500X; Jeep Renegade; Jeep Compass

Powertrain
- Engine: 1.3 L FireFly T4 I4 turbo; 1.8 L E.torQ Flex I4 (petrol/ethanol); 2.4 L Tigershark II I4 (petrol/ethanol); 2.0 L Multijet II I4 (turbocharged diesel)
- Transmission: 6-speed FPT C635 manual 6-speed Aisin AW60T automatic 9-speed ZF 948TE automatic

Dimensions
- Wheelbase: 2,990 mm (117.7 in)
- Length: 4,915 mm (193.5 in)
- Width: 1,844 mm (72.6 in)
- Height: 1,746 mm (68.7 in)
- Curb weight: 1,619–1,871 kg (3,569–4,125 lb)

The Fiat Toro is a compact pickup truck made by Fiat in Brazil. It is derived from the Fiat FCC4 Concept and is based on the Small Wide 4×4 architecture shared with the Jeep Renegade, Jeep Compass, and the Fiat 500X. In several markets in Latin America including Colombia, the Toro is sold as the Ram 1000, using the Ram Trucks marque.

== History ==
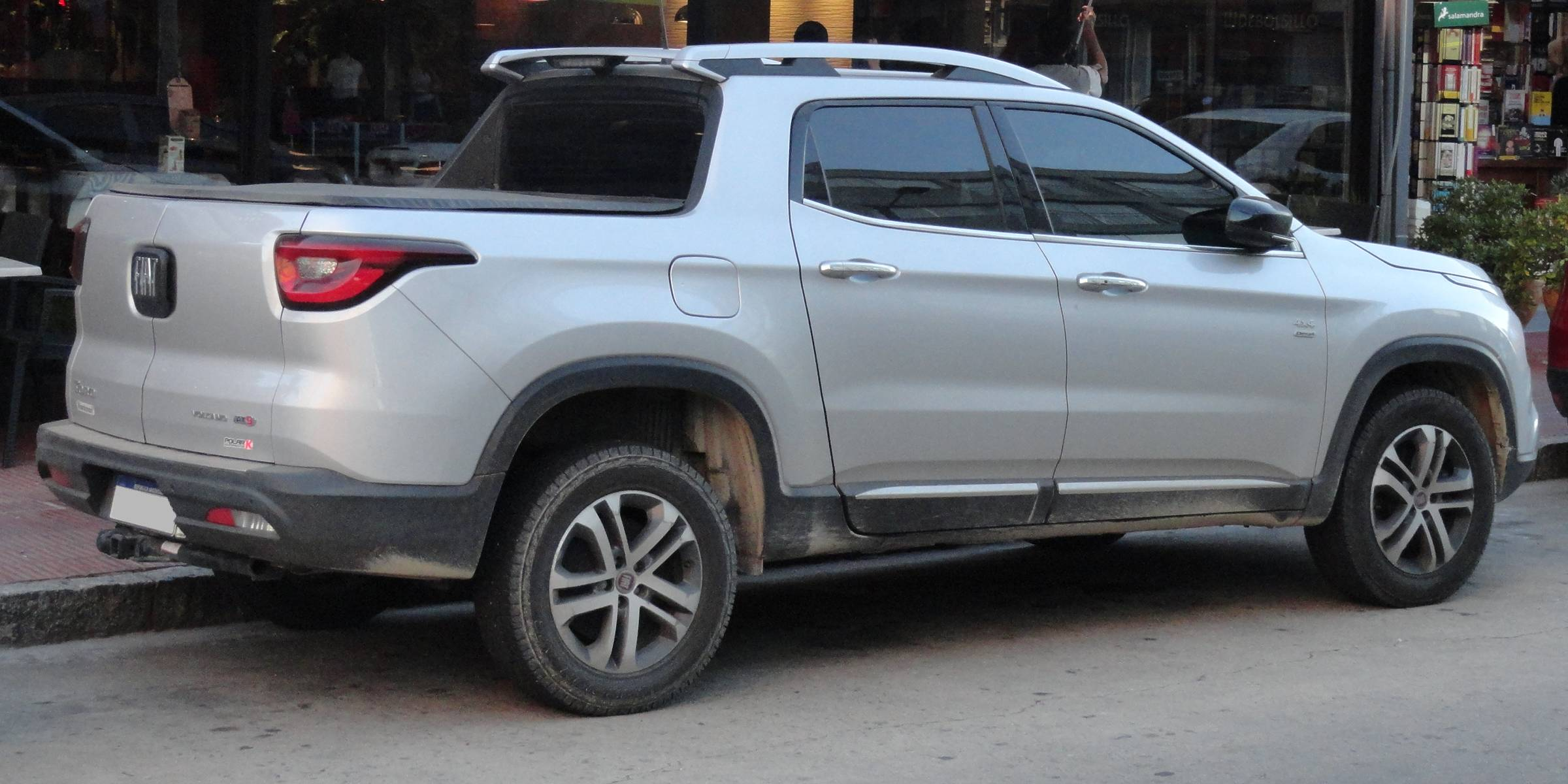
Rear view

The Fiat Toro was developed under the codename Type 226, intended as the second product of the FCA factory in Goiana, Pernambuco, Brazil. It became the country's first medium-compact pickup since the Renault Duster Oroch.

In May 2016, the Toro won a Red Dot Design Award.

In the Brazilian market, Fiat sold over 100,000 units in the first two years following the Toro's launch.

== 2021 facelift ==
The Toro facelift was released in April 2021. It is equipped with a new turbocharged 1.3-liter engine running with petrol/ethanol. Available in Brazil in Endurance, Freedom, Volcano, Ranch, and Ultra trim levels.

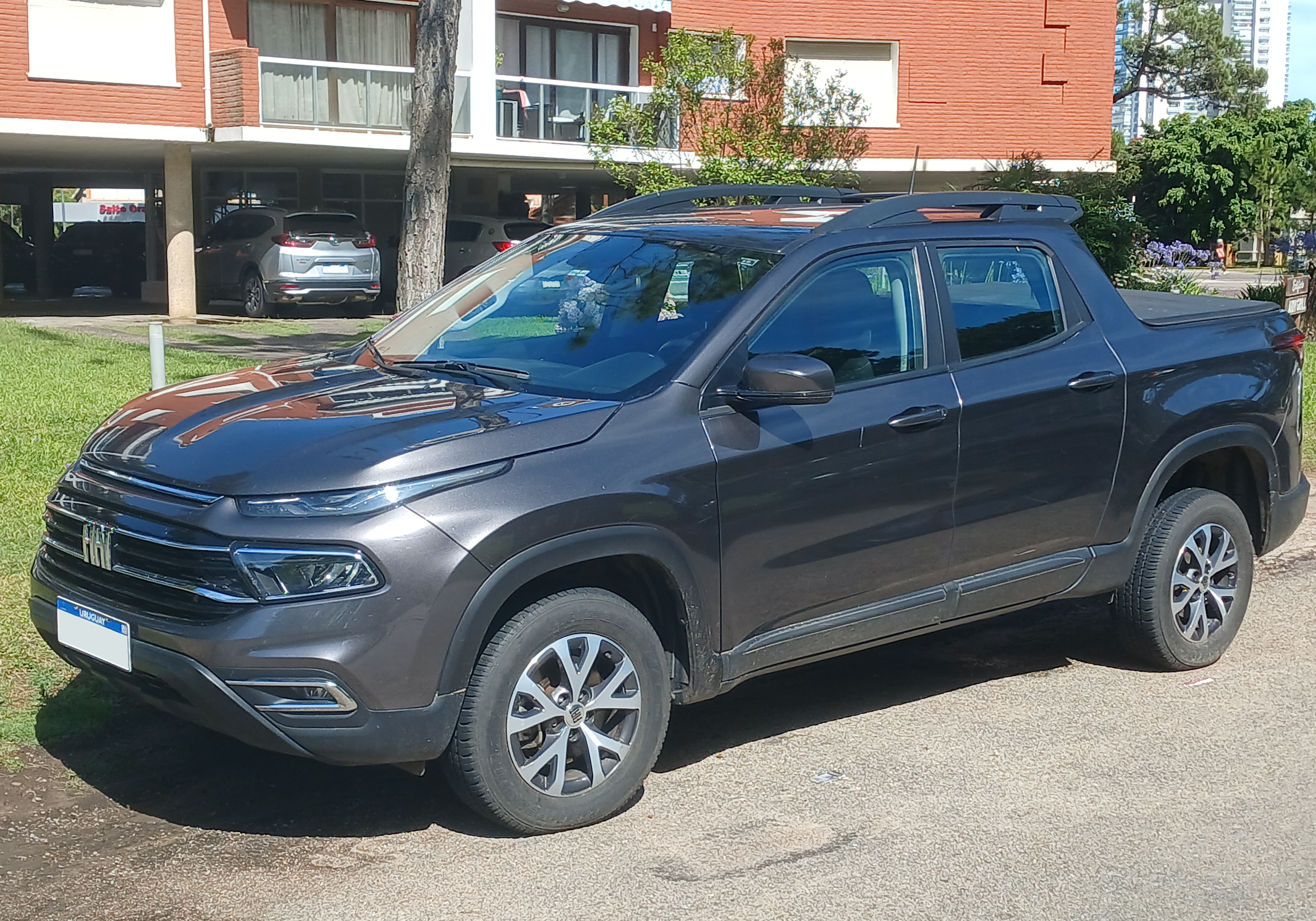
Front View

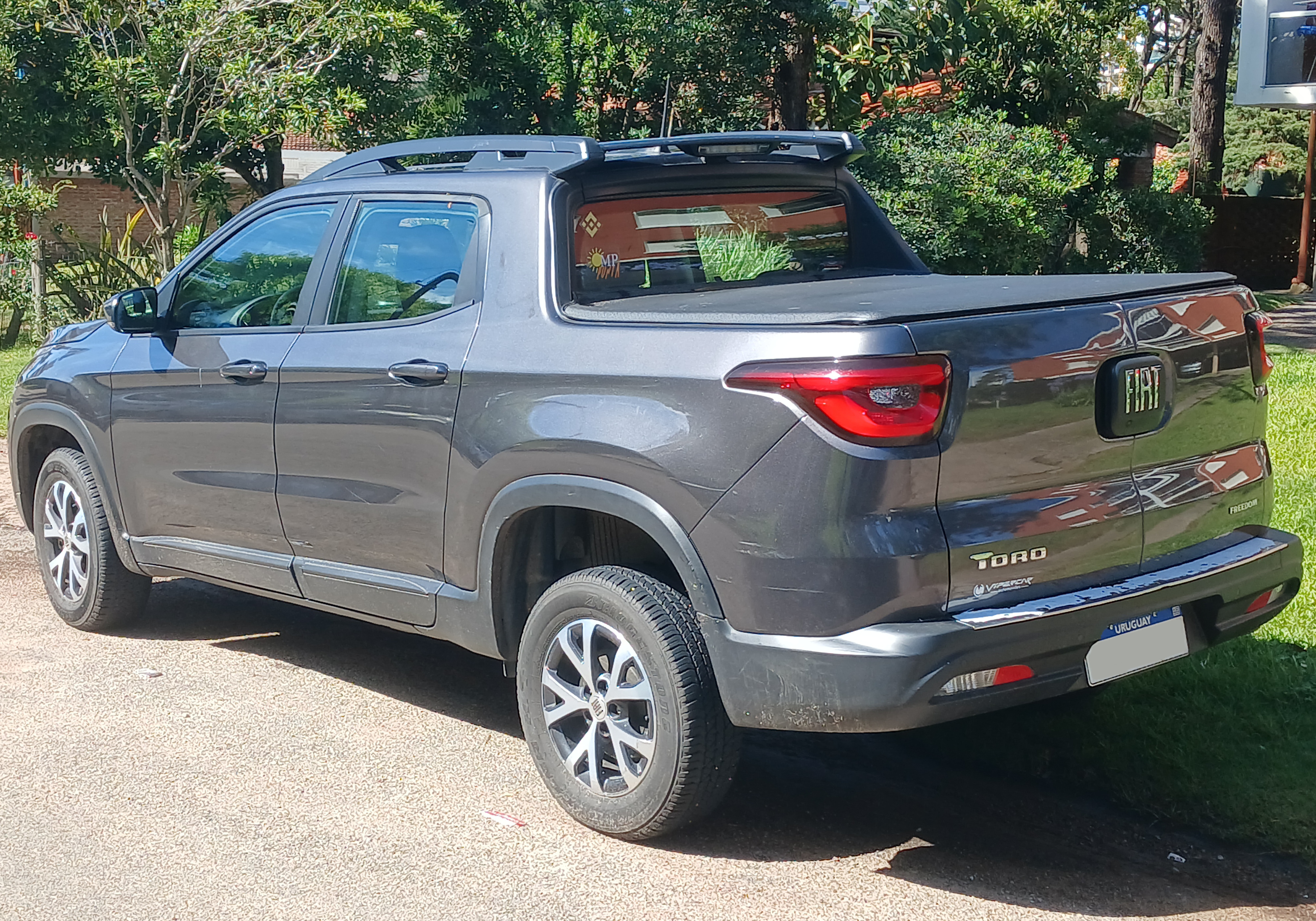
Rear View

== 2025 facelift ==
The Toro received a facelift for the 2026 model year, introduced in August 2025, with a more geometric front and rear design, revised full-LED lighting, an electronic parking brake with Auto Hold, and rear USB-A/USB-C ports.

== Safety ==
The Toro has front disc brakes.

The Toro in its most basic Latin American market configuration with 2 airbags received 4 stars for adult occupants and 4 stars for infants from Latin NCAP 2.0 in 2018. The Toro had a total score enough for five stars for adult protection, however it did not meet the prerequisite that a side head protection device be fitted as standard across the range and pass a side pole impact test. Fiat sponsored a side pole test on a variant with the optional head airbags fitted and Latin NCAP confirmed that it passed the side pole test, indicating that the model would have achieved five stars, had the head airbags been standard equipment.

Latin NCAP 2.0 test results Fiat Toro + 2 Airbags (2018, based on Euro NCAP 2008)
Test	Points	Stars
Adult occupant:	29.40/34.0	4 /5 stars
Child occupant:	36.90/49.00	4 /5 stars

== Sales ==
Calendar year	Brazil	Argentina
2016	41,283	
2017	50,723	15,973
2018	58,477	6,333
2019	65,298	6,214
2020	53,981	7,628
2021	70,890	4,777
2022	49,573	3,810
2023	51,314	
2024	53,848	
2025	52,133	
