= Ram Rampage =

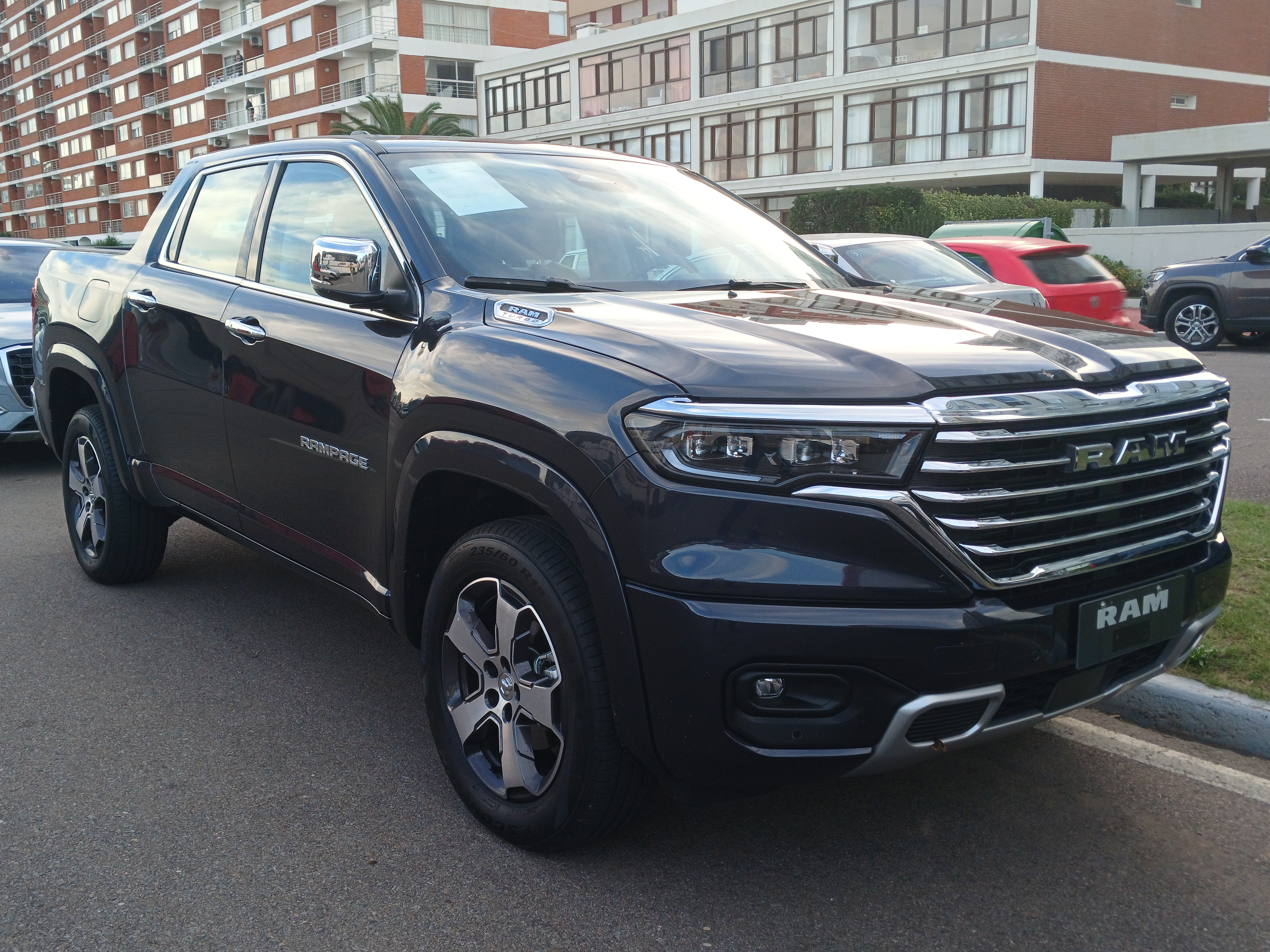
- Ram Rampage Laramie

Overview
- Manufacturer: Ram Trucks (Stellantis)
- Production: June 2023 – present
- Model years: 2024–present
- Assembly: Brazil: Goiana, Pernambuco

Body and chassis
- Class: Compact pickup truck
- Body style: 4-door pickup truck
- Layout: Front-engine, all-wheel drive
- Platform: Small Wide 4×4 LWB
- Chassis: Unibody
- Related: Jeep Compass (second generation); Jeep Commander/Meridian; Fiat Toro

Powertrain
- Engine: Gasoline: 2.0 L GME T4 Hurricane I4 turbo; Diesel: 2.0 L Multijet II I4 turbo; 2.2 L Multijet II I4 turbo
- Power output: Gasoline: 272 hp (203 kW); Diesel: 200 hp (150 kW)
- Transmission: 9-speed ZF 948TE automatic

Dimensions
- Wheelbase: 2,994 mm (117.9 in)
- Length: 5,028 mm (198.0 in)
- Width: 1,886 mm (74.3 in)
- Height: 1,780 mm (70.1 in)
- Curb weight: 1,906–1,951 kg (4,202–4,301 lb)

The Ram Rampage is a unibody pickup truck produced by Stellantis in Brazil and marketed through the American Ram marque. Introduced in June 2023, it is the first Ram-branded vehicle to be produced in Brazil.

According to Ram, the name 'Rampage' is taken from the English word, meaning "agitation, noise, uproar, fury". The name was also reused from the Dodge's coupe utility from the 1980s, the Dodge Rampage.

== Design ==
The Rampage is built on the Small Wide global platform shared with the Jeep Compass, Jeep Commander, and Fiat Toro. It is the largest model that uses the platform and received 60 percent of new components on the platform alone, in addition to the bodywork. Ram claimed that 86 percent of high- and ultra-strength steels are used in the Rampage. Many components are shared with the Jeep Compass and Commander, such as the front door panels, windshield, and interior parts and trims. The wheelbase is 4 mm (0.2 in) longer than the Fiat Toro due to adjustments done with the suspension.

The bed is 1,450 mm (57.1 in) long (2,100 mm (82.7 in) with tailgate open) and 1,055 mm (41.5 in) wide, with a volume of 980 liters. For the gasoline model, the capacity is rated at 750 kg (1,653 lb), while the diesel model is rated at 1,015 kg (2,238 lb).

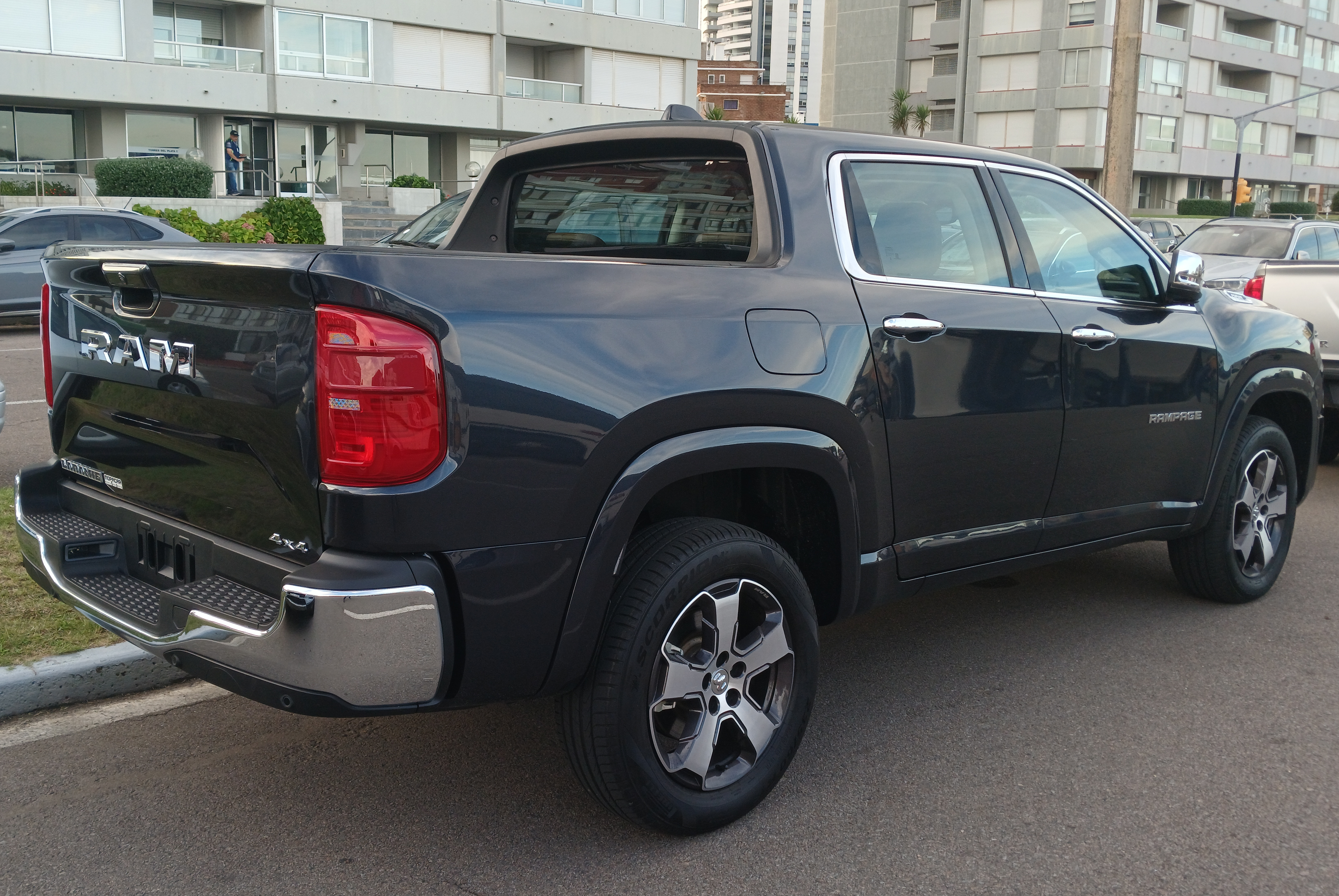
Rear view

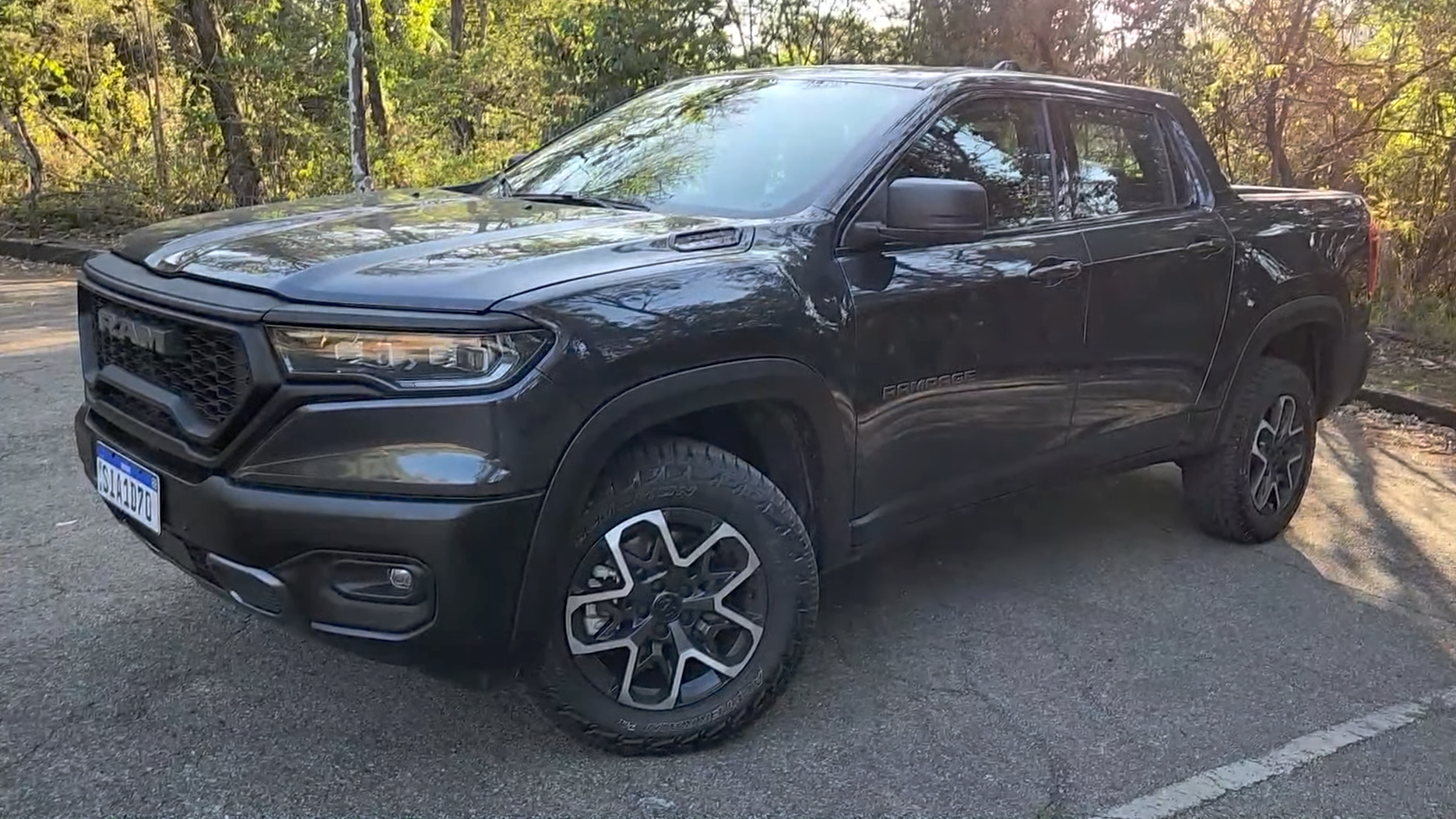
Ram Rampage Rebel

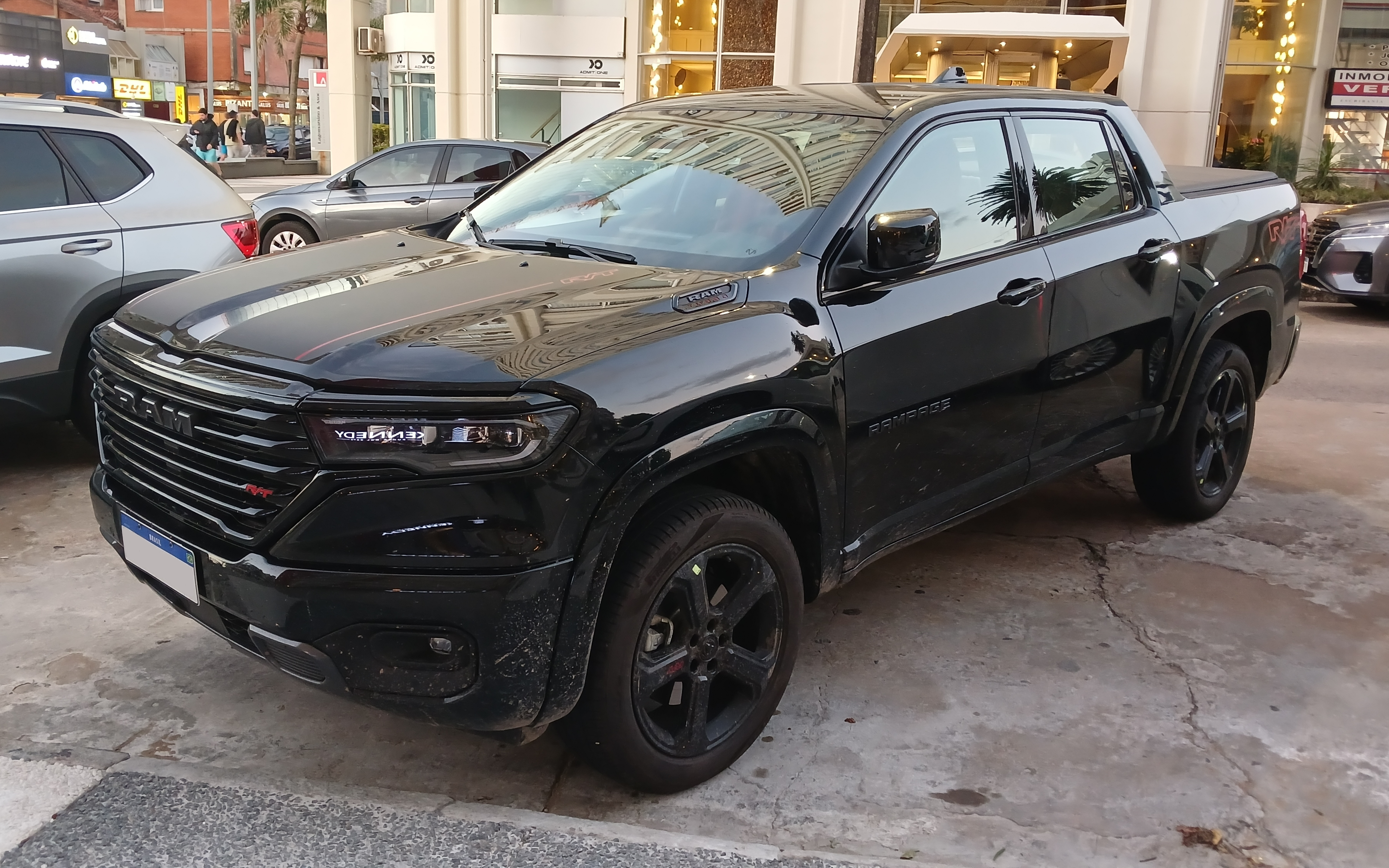
Ram Rampage R/T

== Production ==
Production of the Rampage officially started on June 6, 2023 through a ceremony at the Goiana plant owned by Stellantis. The ceremony was attended by president of Brazil, Luiz Inácio Lula da Silva. Stellantis has invested R$1.3 billion to develop the new vehicle, involving more than 800 engineers and technicians accumulating 1.2 million of work hours. It went on sale in Brazil on June 20, 2023, with deliveries starting in August.

As of May 2026, it is officially slated to be sold in the United States, where it is expected to compete against the Ford Maverick in that market.

== Trims and powertrain ==
The four trim levels are Big Horn, Laramie, Rebel and R/T. Each models has different exterior styling and some mechanical changes to appeal to different types of customers.

All trims irrespective of engine choice are equipped with automatic all-wheel drive with a low setting along with a ZF sourced 9-speed automatic transmission.

The 2.0-liter gasoline turbo is available for all trim levels. Marketed as the Hurricane 4, it has direct injection and dual-flow turbo, which produces 272 PS (268 hp; 200 kW) and 40.8 kg⋅m (400 N⋅m; 295 lb⋅ft). This engine is imported from Italy and has been used by the Jeep Wrangler. Ram claims a 0–100 km/h (0–62 mph) figure of 6.9 seconds and a top speed of 220 km/h (137 mph).

All trim levels except R/T are also available with a turbodiesel Multijet engine. Originally it was a 2.0-liter turbodiesel Multijet engine, shared with the Jeep Compass, Jeep Commander and Fiat Toro, with a maximum output of 170 PS (168 hp; 125 kW) and 38.7 kg⋅m (380 N⋅m; 280 lb⋅ft).

At the end of 2024, it was replaced with a 2.2 Multijet with 200 PS (197 hp; 147 kW) and 45.9 kg⋅m (450 N⋅m; 332 lb⋅ft), and a 0–100 km/h (0–62 mph) time of 10.9 seconds.

== Sales ==
Year	Brazil
2023	8,637
2024	23,620
2025	26,140
