= Standard Cost Coding System =

A Standard Cost Coding System is a system of cost classification that can be used for benchmarking cost and quantities data. In the Norwegian oil and gas industry, NORSOK Z-014 developed as part of the NORSOK standards. ISO is also developing a Standard Cost coding System as an extension of NORSOK Z-014 under ISO 19008.

Typically a Cost Classification system would be used to classify, activities, resources and product structure. In NORSOK Z-014, these classification taxonomies are called Standard Activity Breakdown (SAB), Code of Resources (COR) and Physical Breakdown Structure (PBS).
