= SCCS platform =

Automobile platform

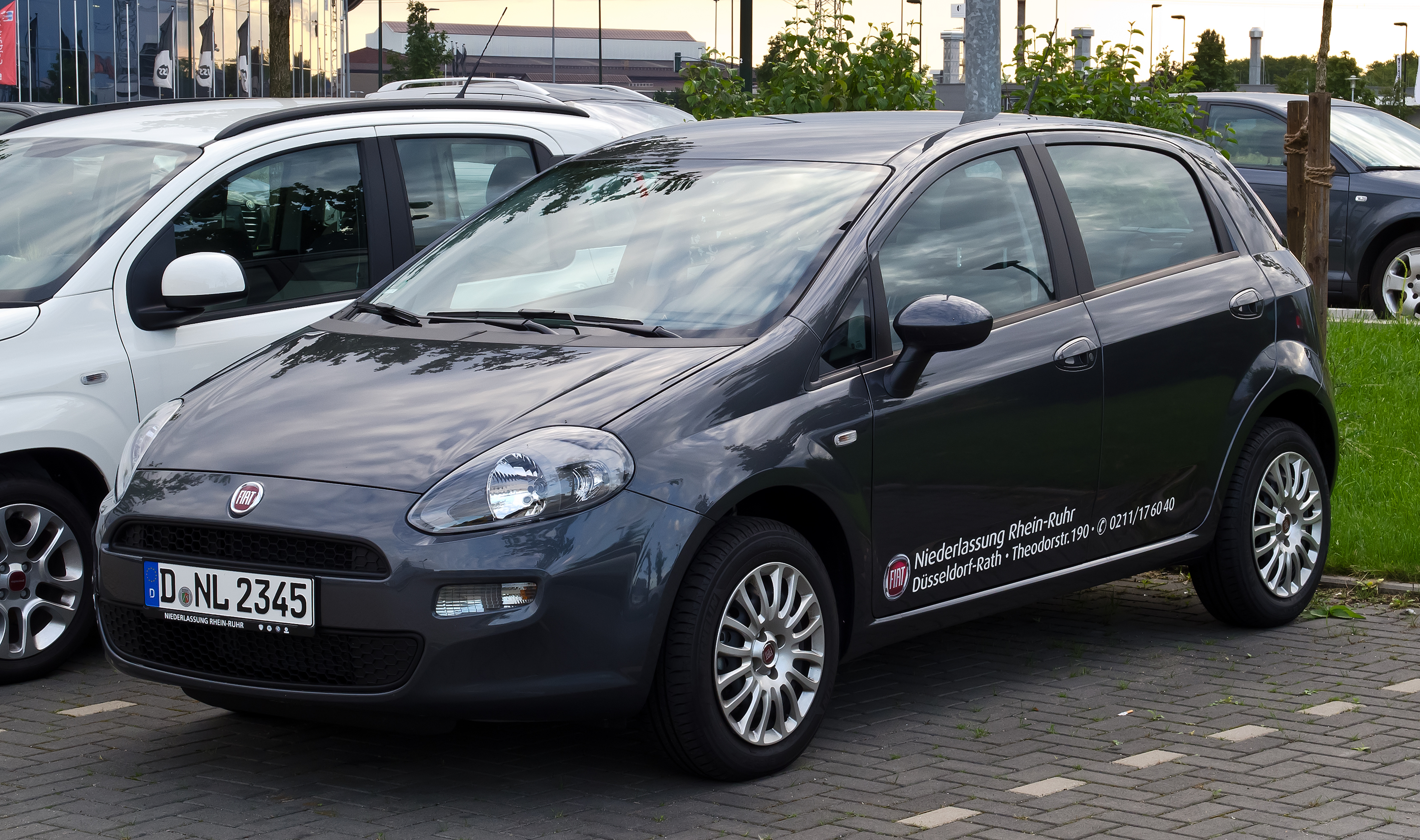

Overview
- Manufacturer: Stellantis; General Motors
- Also called: Small platform 199 platform
- Production: 2005–present

Body and chassis
- Class: Subcompact car, (B-segment)
- Layout: Front-engine, front-wheel drive / four-wheel drive

Chronology
- Predecessor: Fiat B-platform; GM4200 platform
- Successor: STLA platform

The SCCS platform (Small Common Components and Systems platform), also called Small Platform or 199 platform is an automobile platform originally developed by Fiat for subcompact, front-wheel drive, and all-wheel drive vehicles. It was first used on the Fiat Grande Punto, which was unveiled in 2005. Developed during the GM-Fiat alliance, the platform was also used for some Opel models including the Opel Corsa D and E. A derivative called the Small Wide platform was introduced in 2012 for applications on larger cars in the compact segment. Usage of the platform continued through the merger of Fiat and Chrysler which created Fiat Chrysler Automobiles (FCA), and the merger of FCA and PSA which formed Stellantis.

== Specification ==
Developed from 2002 in Turin, Italy, by Ulrich Schmalohr the engineer head of Opel (which at the time was a subsidiary of General Motors) and Giorgio Cornacchia head-project of Fiat Auto the Small platform was designed to be adaptable for Fiat Group and General Motors small cars, and later was adopted by Chrysler vehicles as well. All components are totally new, and were made to be adaptable to more types of vehicles (including hatchback, sedan, crossover, SUV and MPV). The frame makes heavy use of high-strength steel. In the first version of the platform the front suspension uses MacPherson struts, while at the rear it has a semi-independent strut with torsion beam (except on the Fiat Doblò, which has bi-link rear suspension).

The platform offers compact transverse engine at the front with front-wheel drive, but it also supports all-wheel drive. It was designed to be suitable for a wide range of applications, from basic ones to sportier vehicles like the Alfa Romeo MiTo, Abarth Grande Punto/Punto Evo and Opel's OPC versions. The 4WD version of the platform underpins the Jeep Renegade and the Fiat 500X, both assembled at Fiat's Melfi plant.

The Small platform has a wheelbase of 2,511 mm (98.9 in) in the standard version, which is used on the Fiat Punto (Project 199), Opel Corsa D, Alfa Romeo MiTo and the LAV vehicles built by Tofaş: Fiat Fiorino and Qubo, Citroën Nemo and Peugeot Bipper.

Applications for General Motors vehicles ended in 2019 after the Opel Corsa E was replaced by a new generation based on the PSA CMP (EMP1) platform.

== Long wheelbase version ==
The long wheelbase version is adopted by the Fiat Linea sedan models, Fiat Doblò (with related twin Opel Combo D) and the recent Fiat 500L. Thanks to the interchangeable modules the basic platform is suitable for vehicles of differing lengths up to 4.74 metres (15.6 ft) (Fiat Doblò Maxi).

The first vehicle built on the LWB platform was the Fiat Linea, with a wheelbase of 2,603 mm (102.5 in). At the end of 2009 Fiat re-engineered the LWB platform with a new bi-link independent rear suspension for the new Doblò (second generation, and related Opel Combo D). The LWB platform of the Doblò has a wheelbase of 2,760 mm (108.7 in) for the standard version and 3,110 mm (122.4 in) for the Maxi (extra long) version.

== Applications ==
=== Small (SCCS) ===
==== Small ====
- Alfa Romeo MiTo (2008–2018)
- Fiat Fiorino/Qubo (2007–2023)
- Fiat Grande Punto (2005–2018)
- Opel Adam (2012–2019)
- Opel Corsa D (2006–2014)
- Opel Corsa E (2014–2019)
- Opel Meriva B (2010–2017)
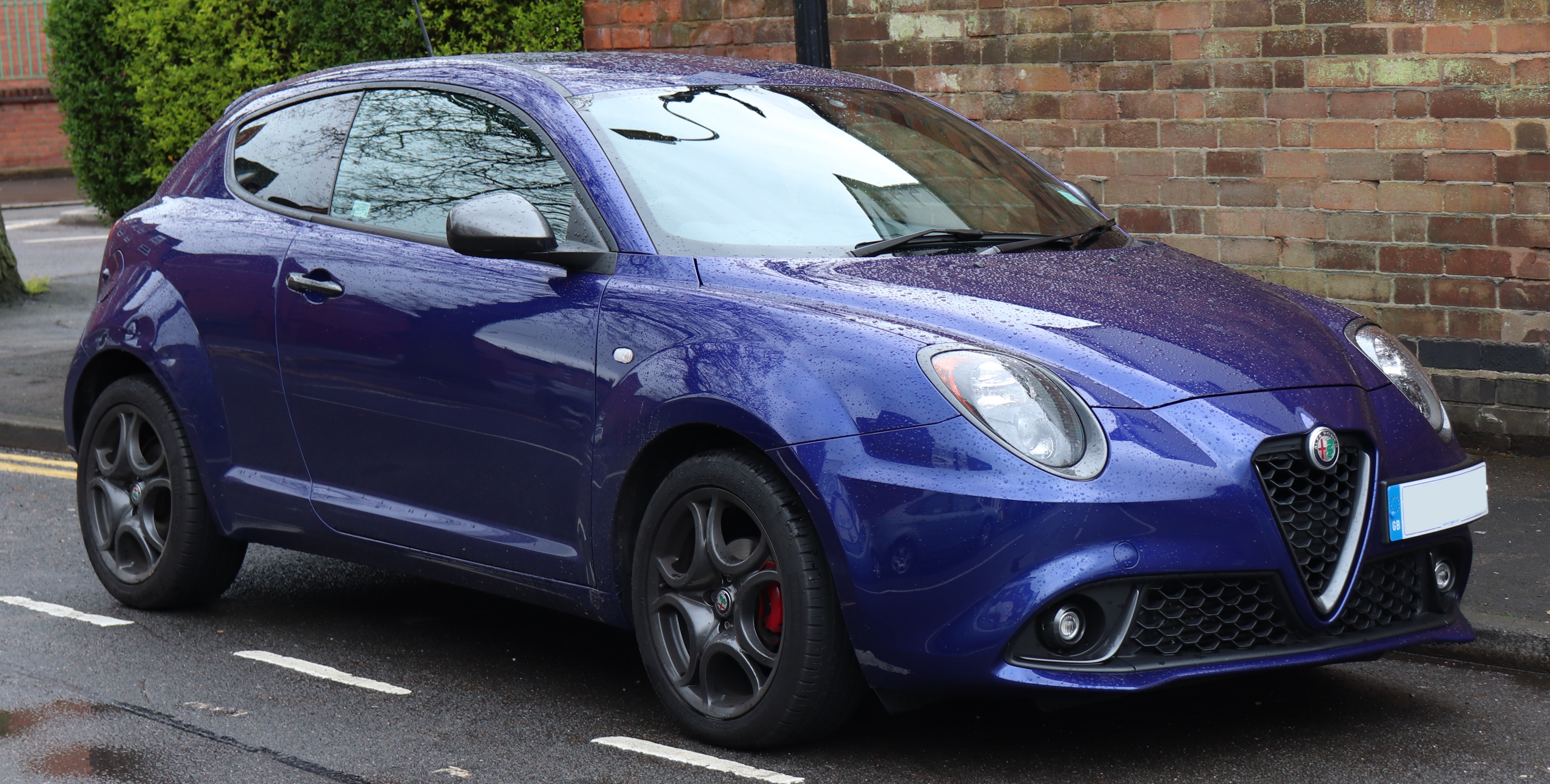
Alfa Romeo MiTo

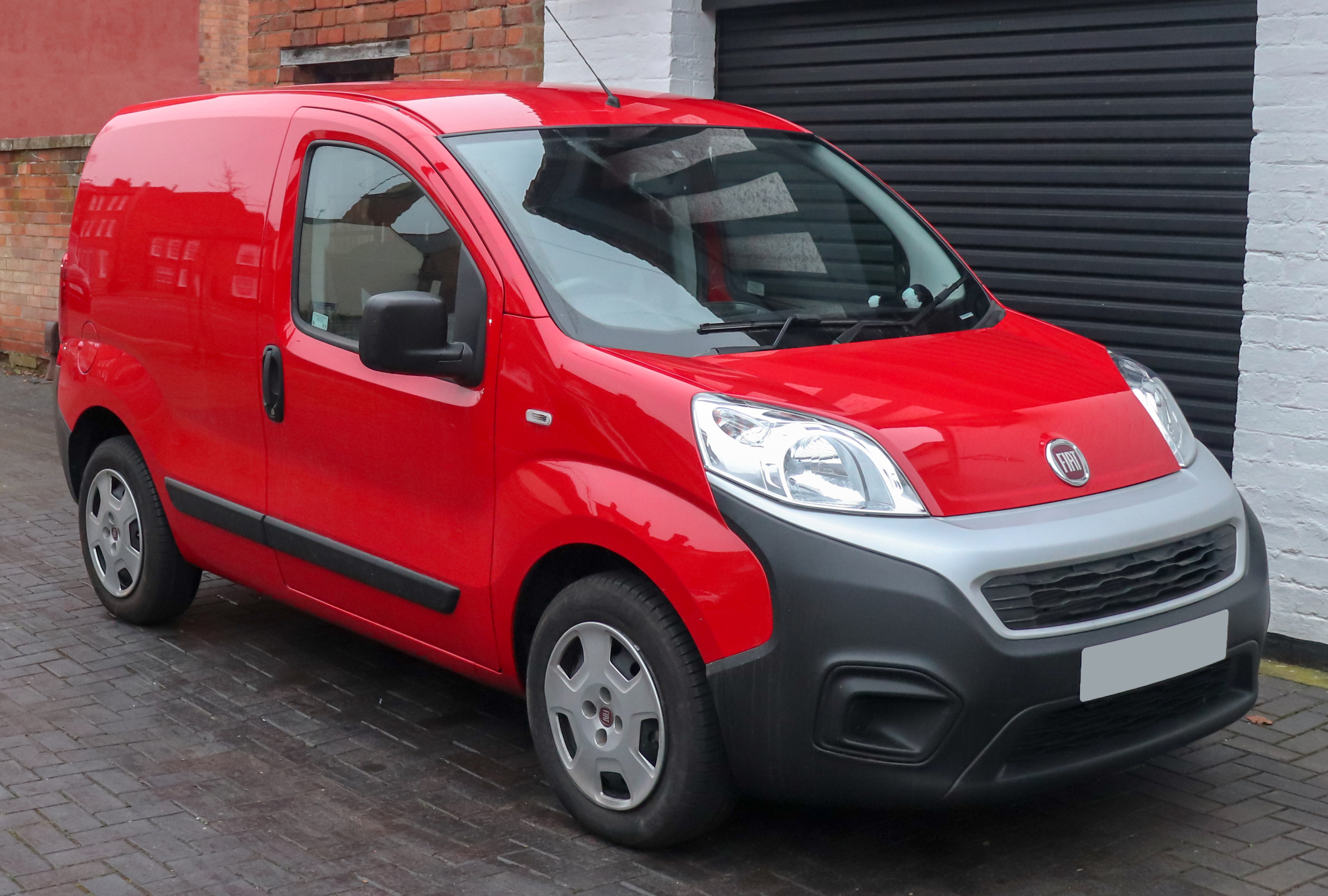
Fiat Fiorino/Qubo

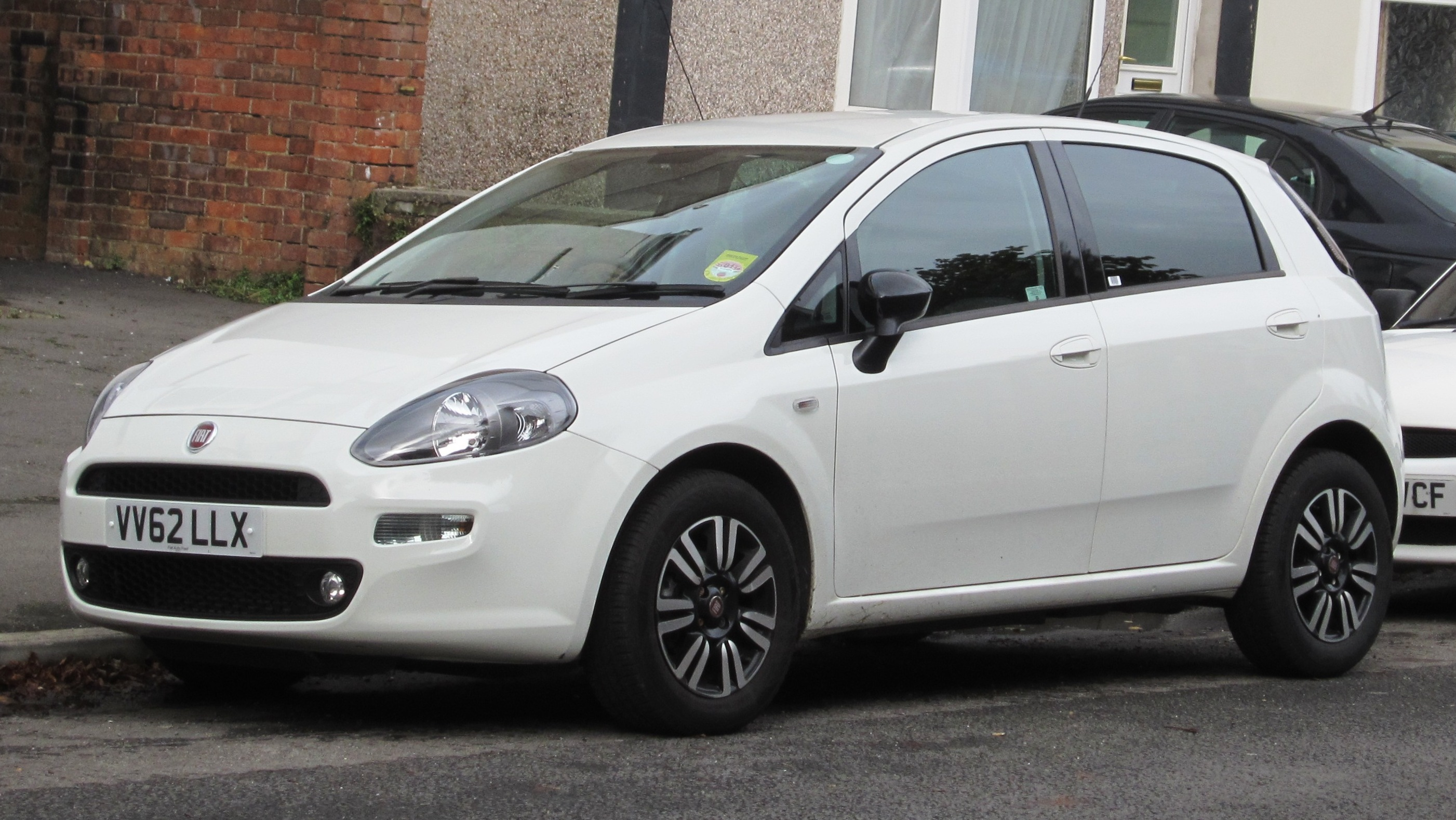
Fiat Grande Punto

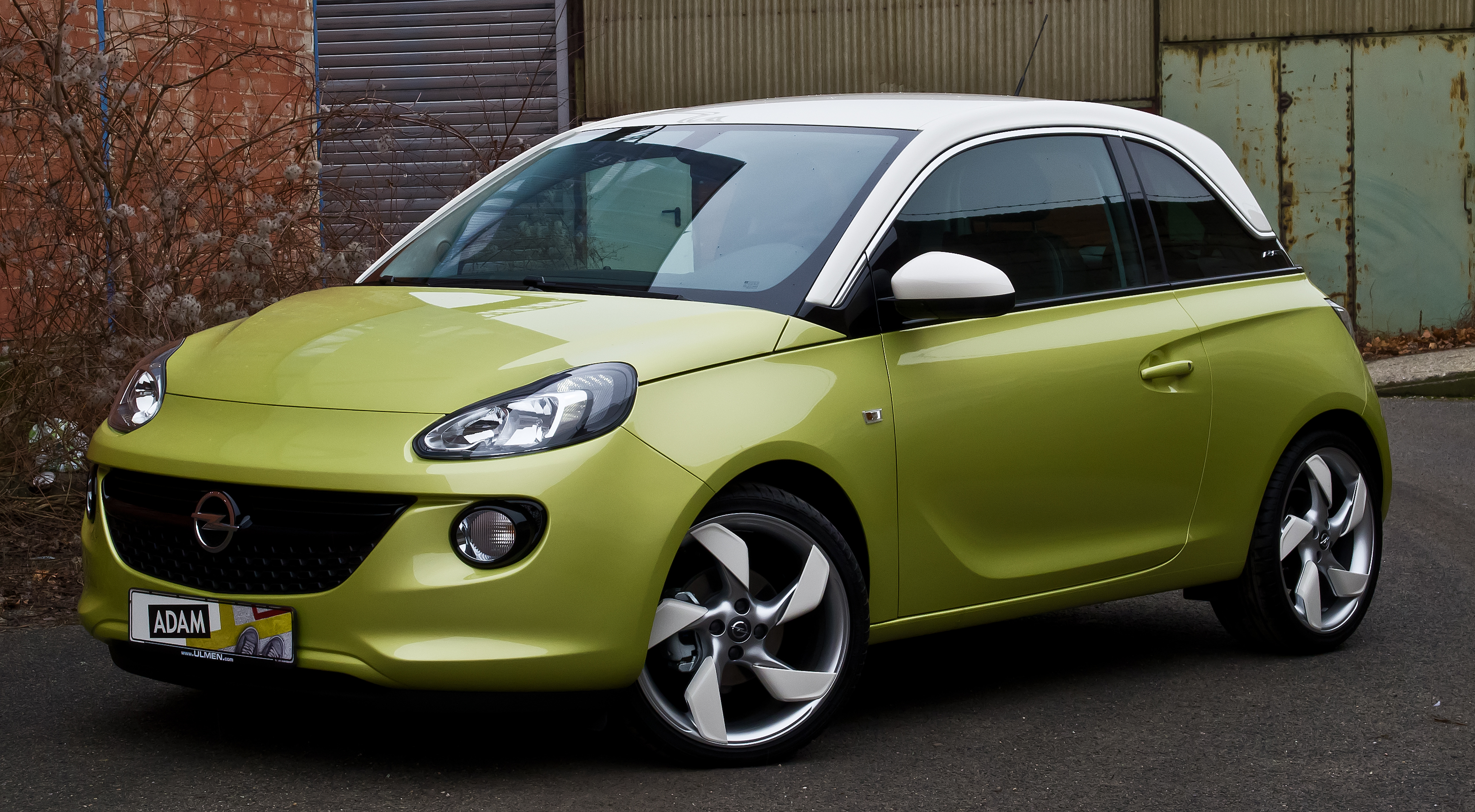
Opel Adam

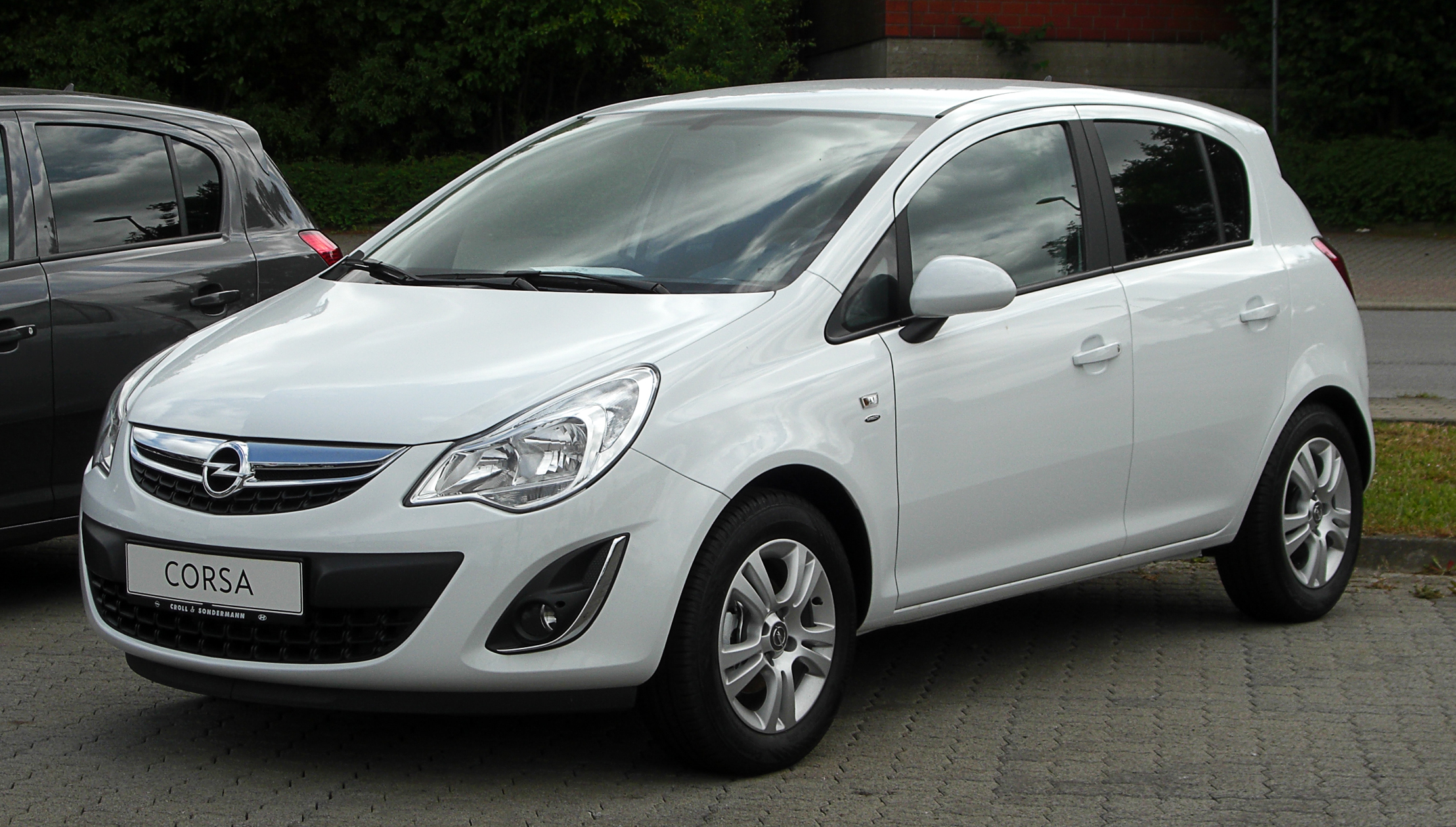
Opel Corsa D

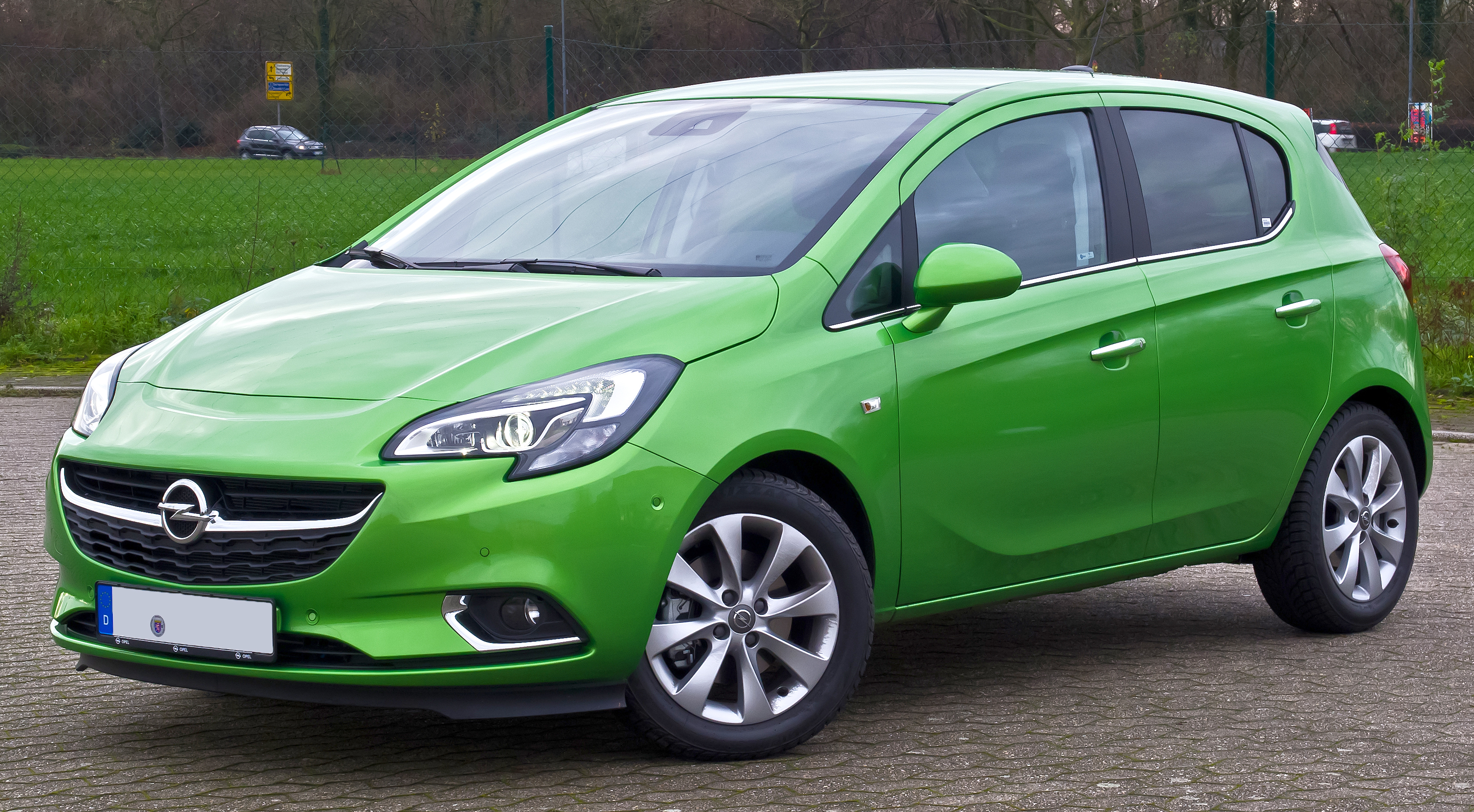
Opel Corsa E

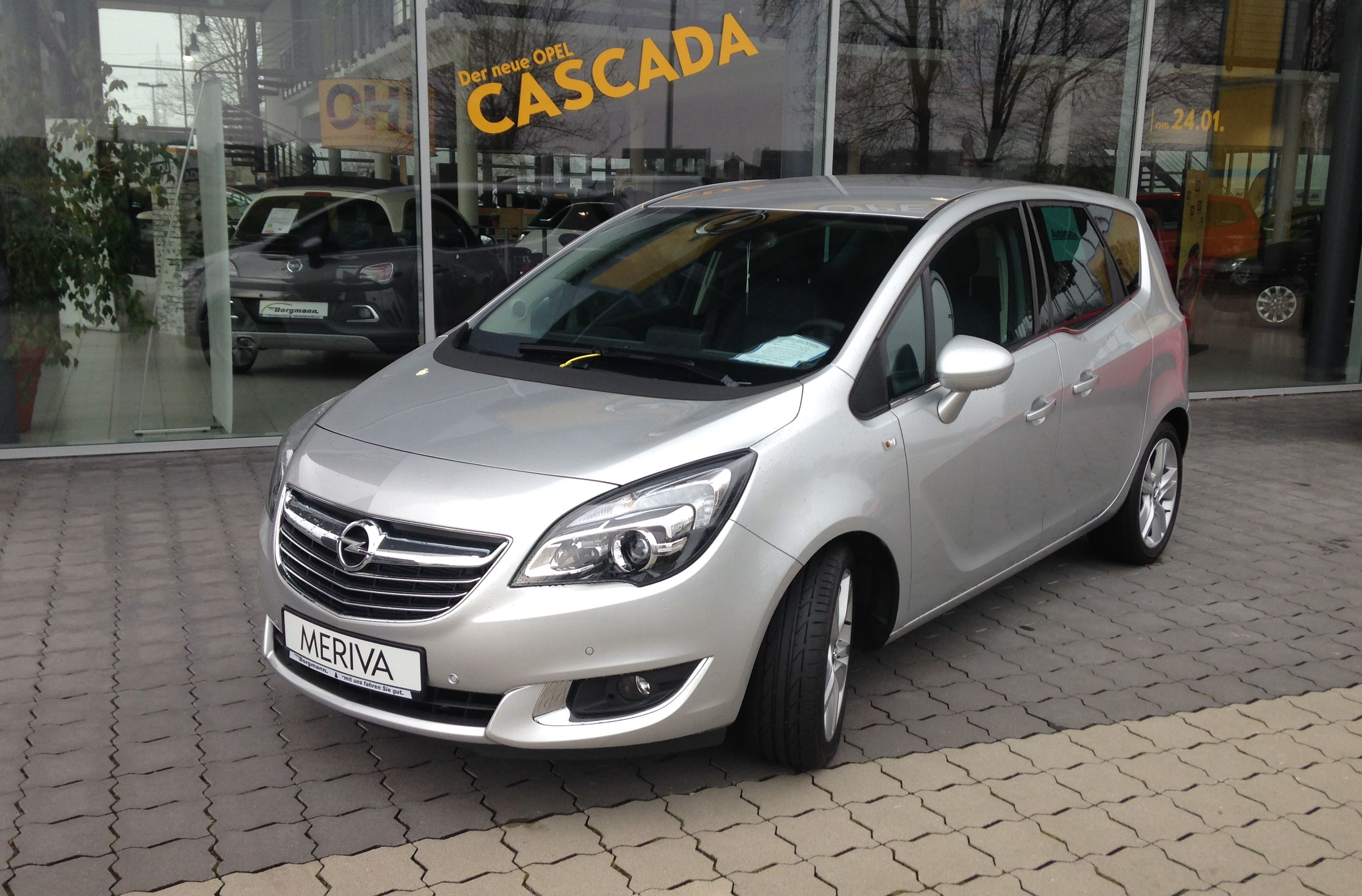
Opel Meriva B

==== Small LWB ====
- Fiat Linea (2007–2018)
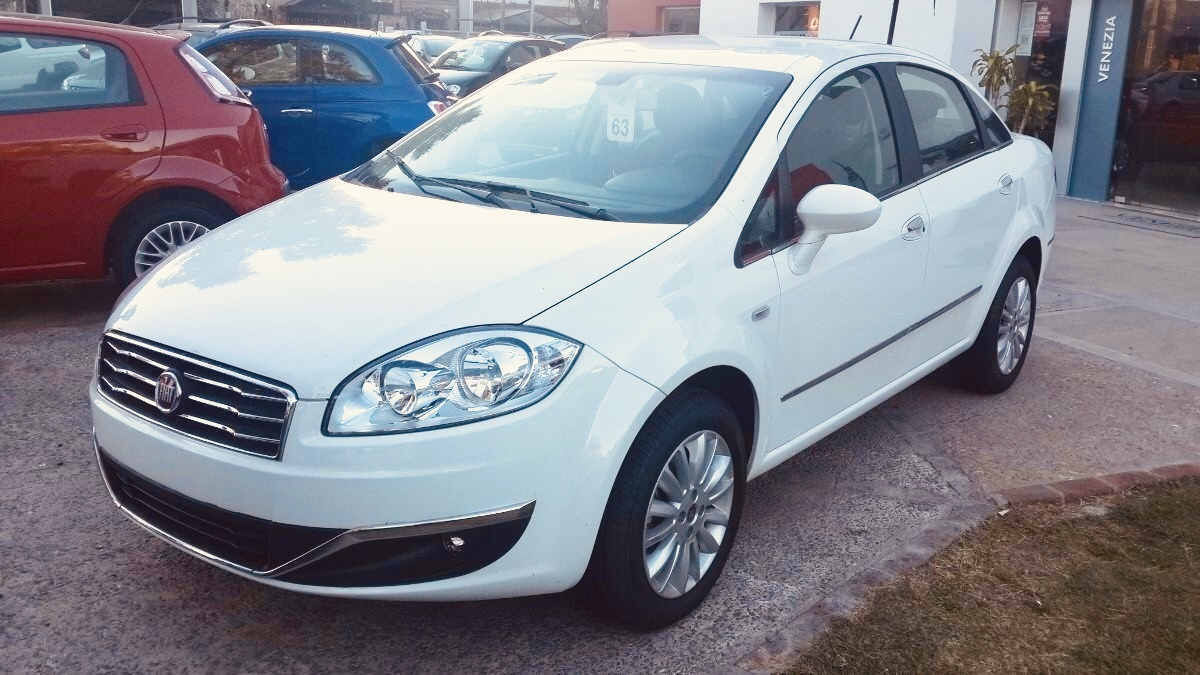
Fiat Linea

=== Small Wide ===
The Small Wide platform is a platform derived from the SCCS platform for wider dimension applications mainly for models built by FCA.

==== Small Wide LWB ====
- Fiat 500L (2012–2022)
- Fiat Tipo/Egea / Dodge Neon (2015–2026)
- Fiat Toro (2015–present)
- Fiat Doblò / Ram ProMaster City / Opel Combo D (2010–2022)
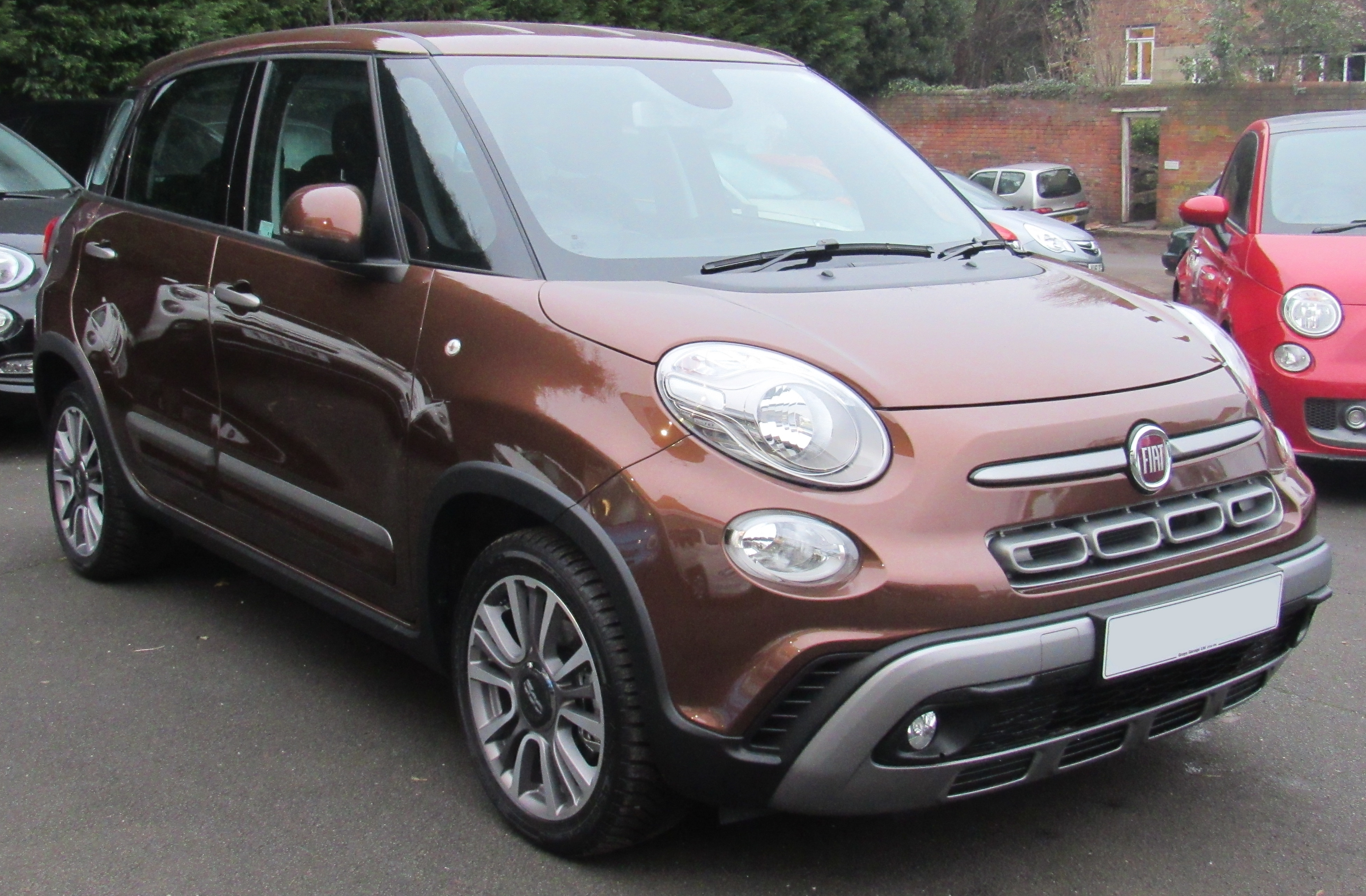
Fiat 500L

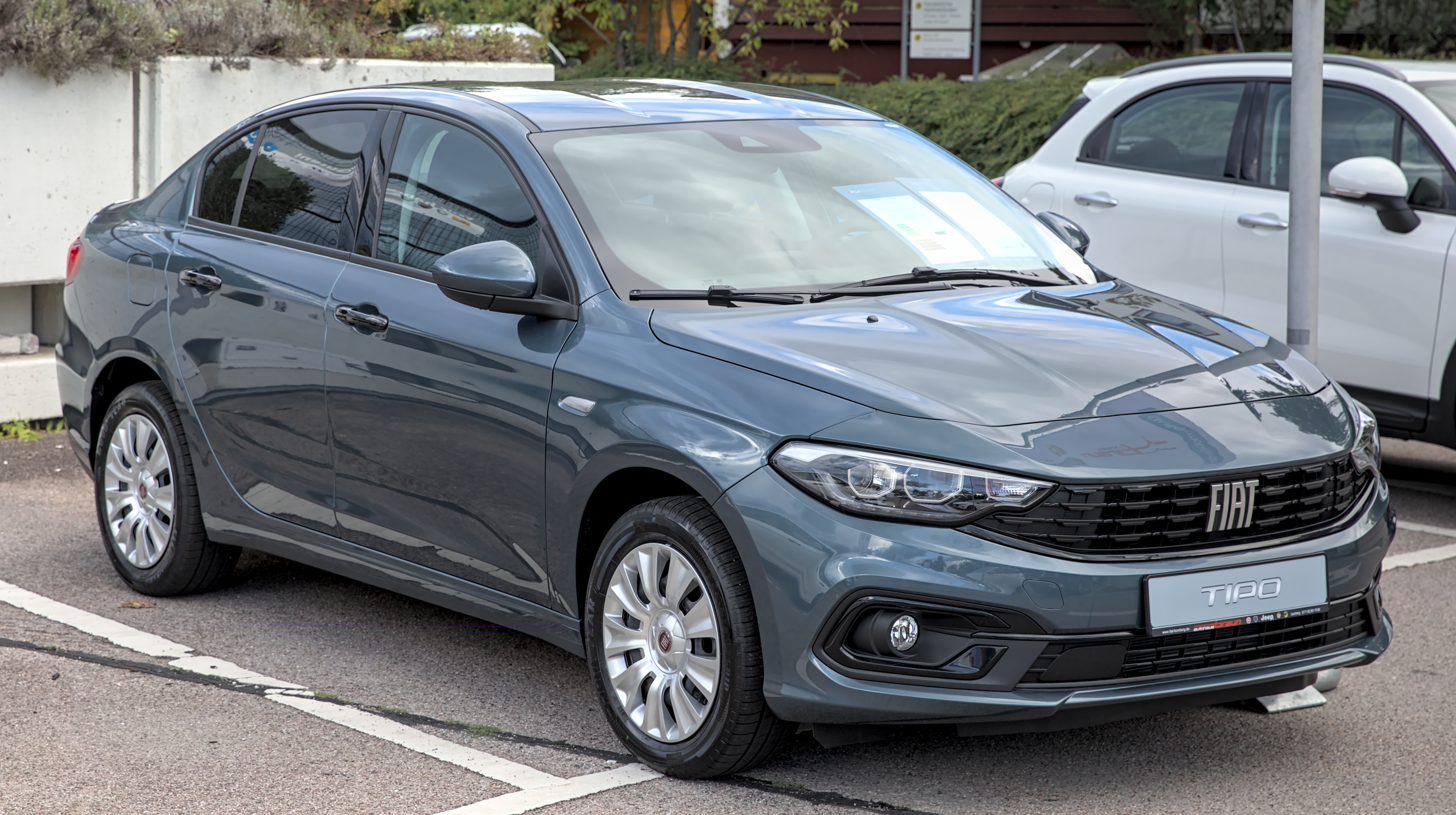
Fiat Tipo/Egea

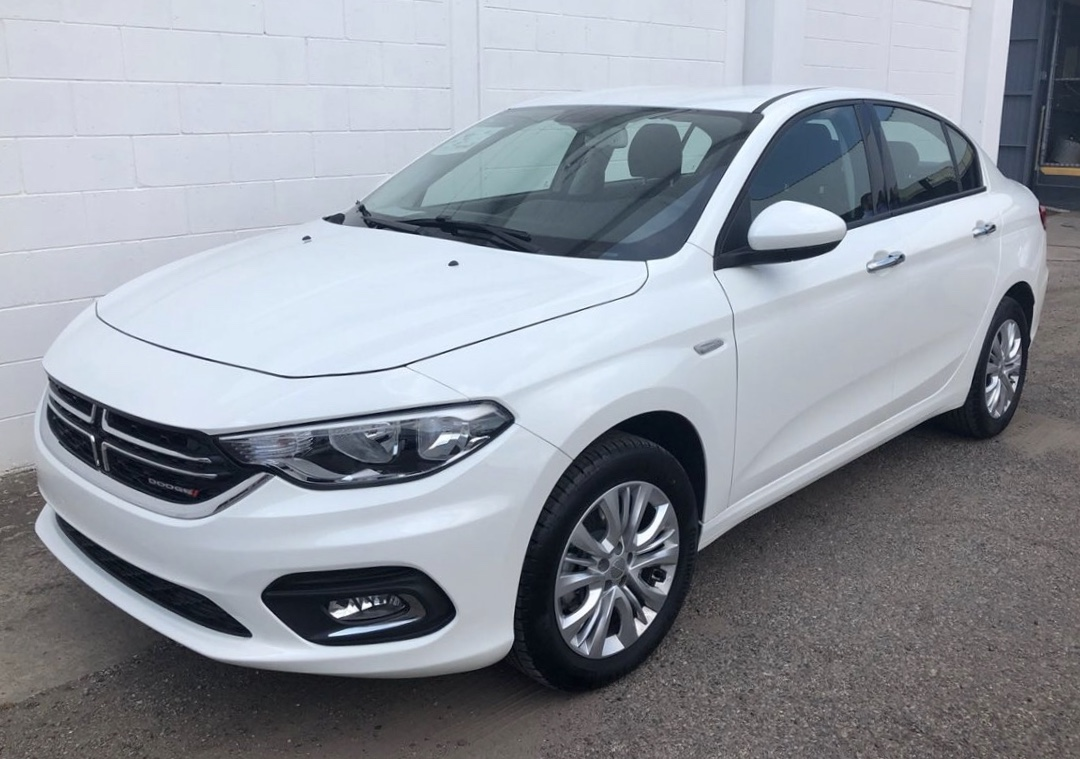
Dodge Neon

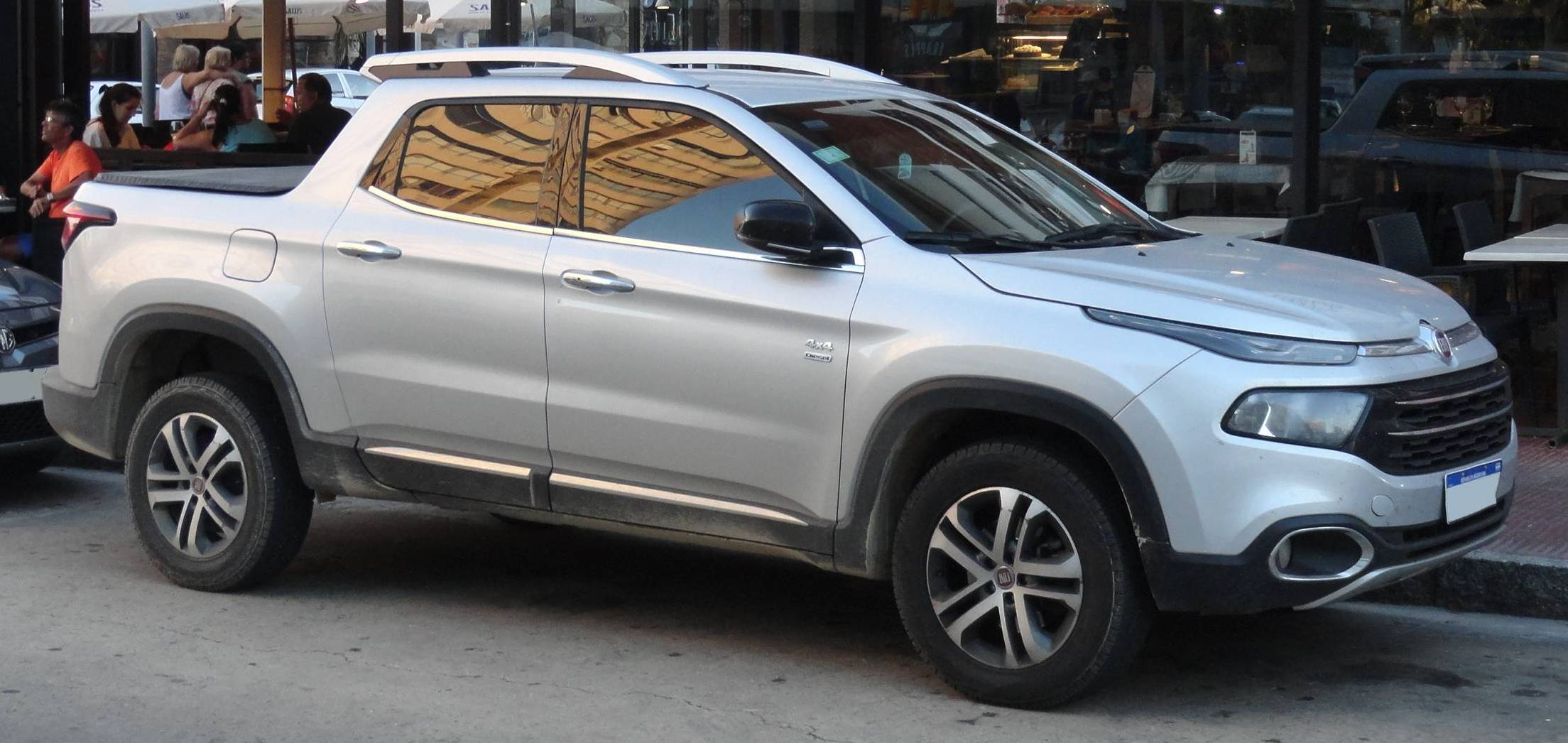
Fiat Toro

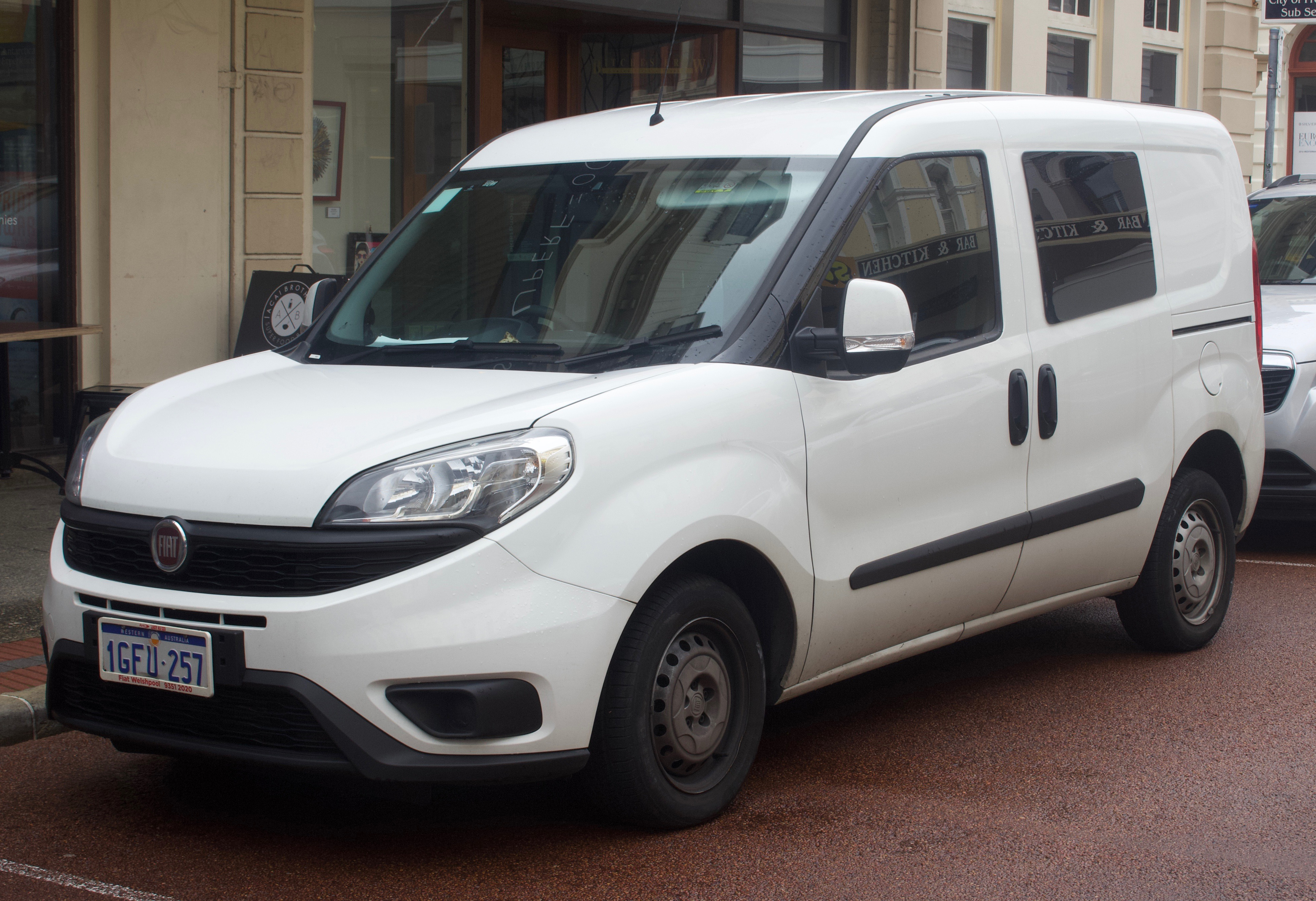
Fiat Doblò

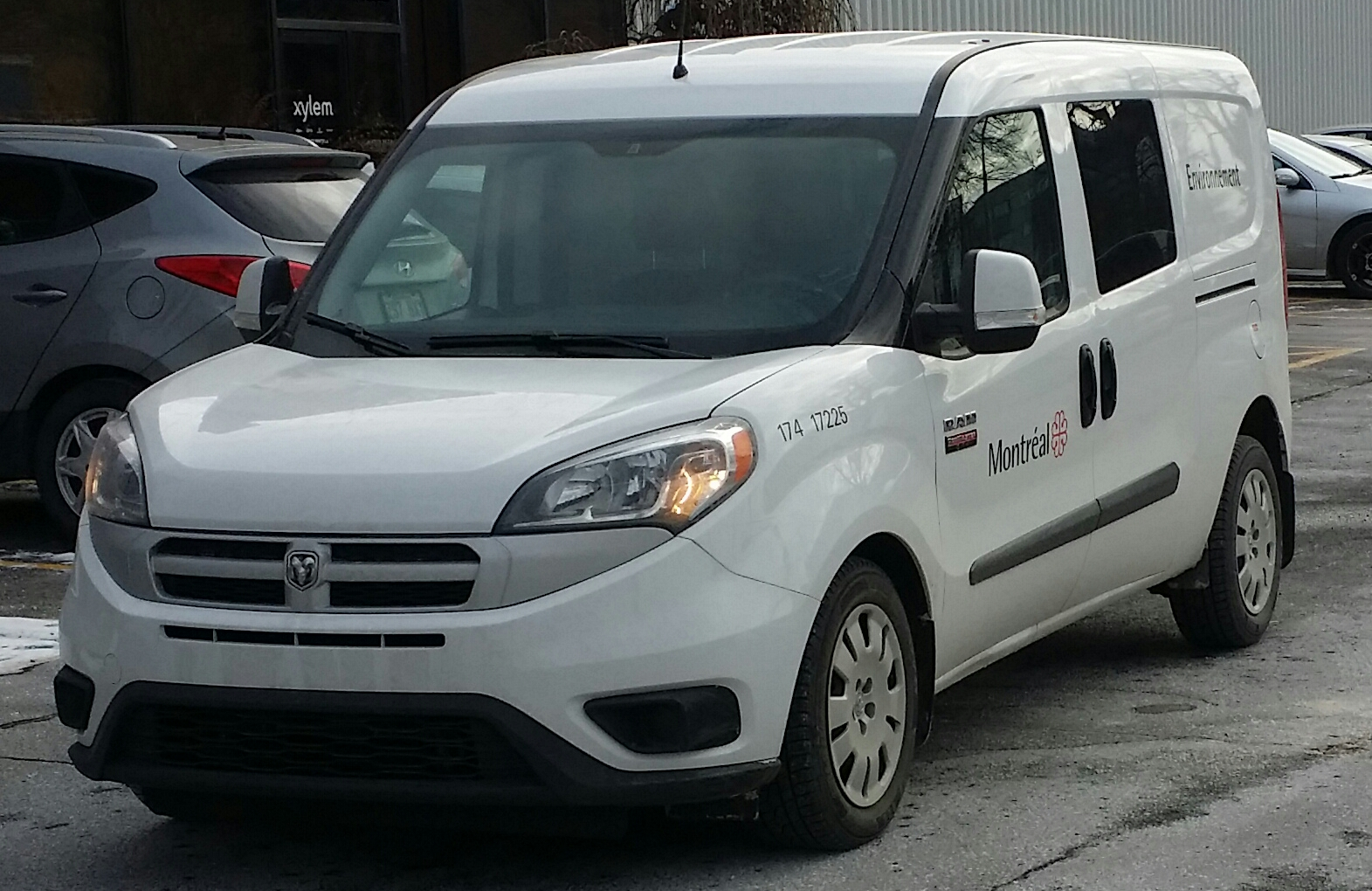
Ram ProMaster City

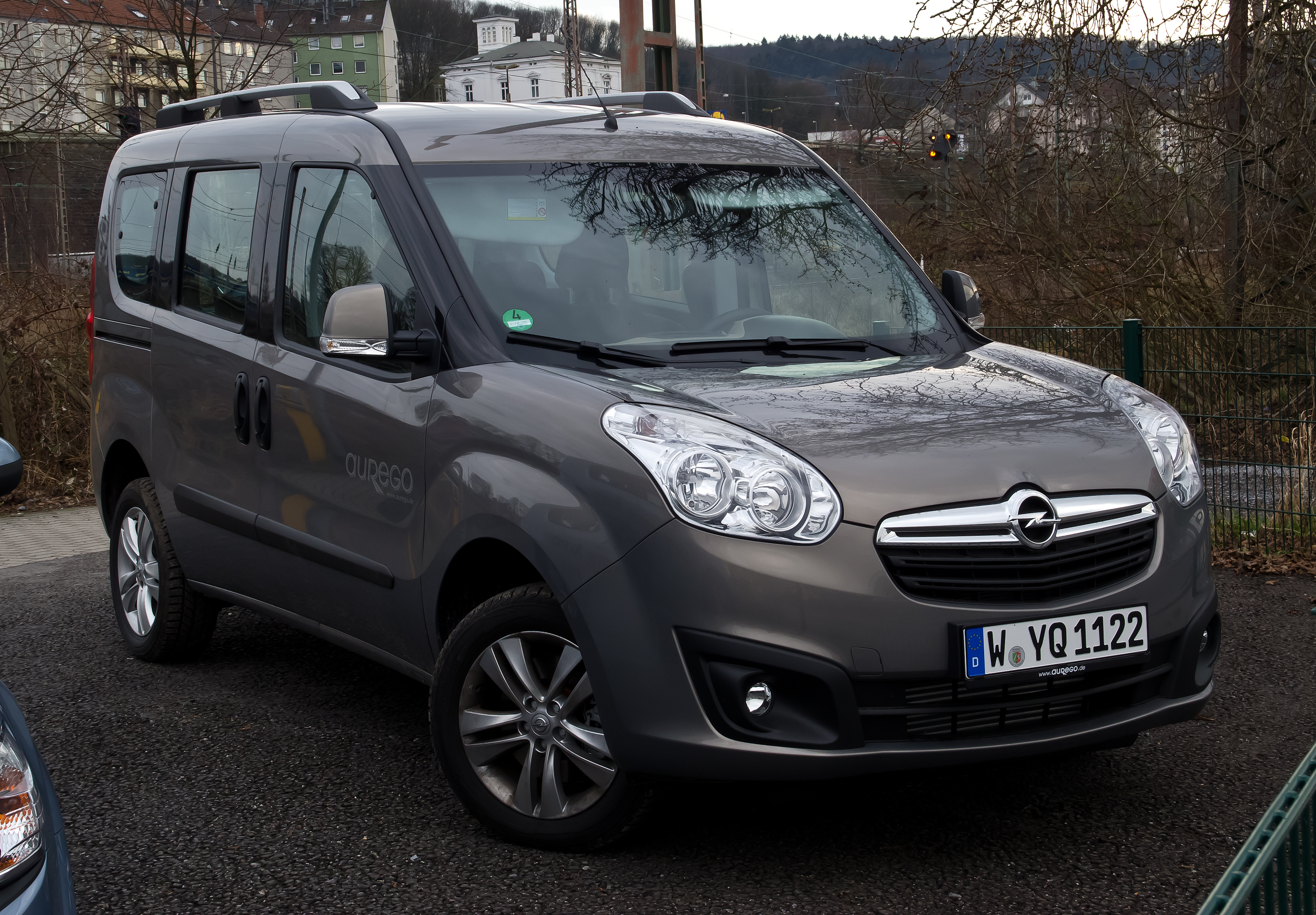
Opel Combo D

==== Small Wide 4×4 ====
- Jeep Renegade (2014–present)
- Fiat 500X (2014–2024)
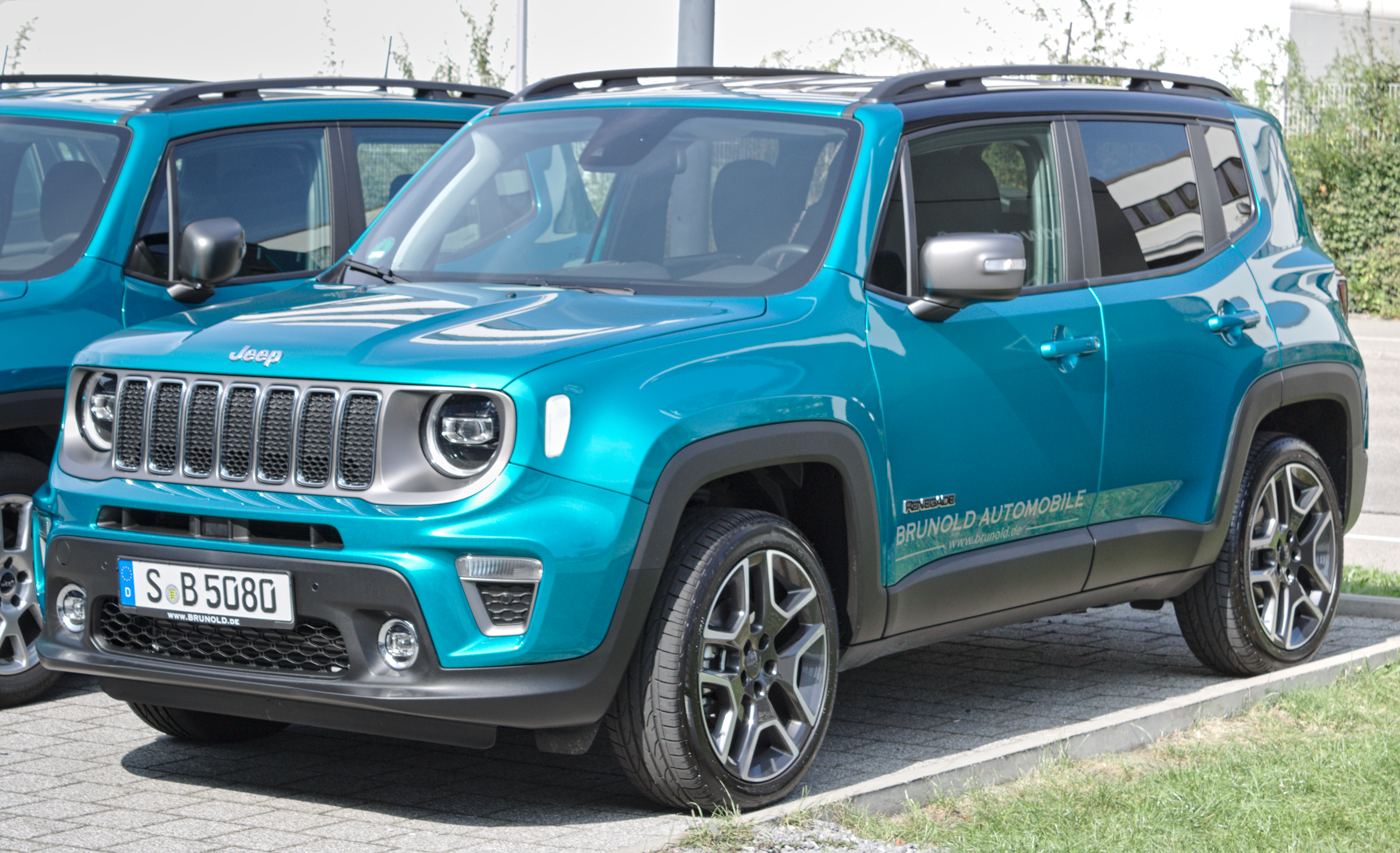
Jeep Renegade

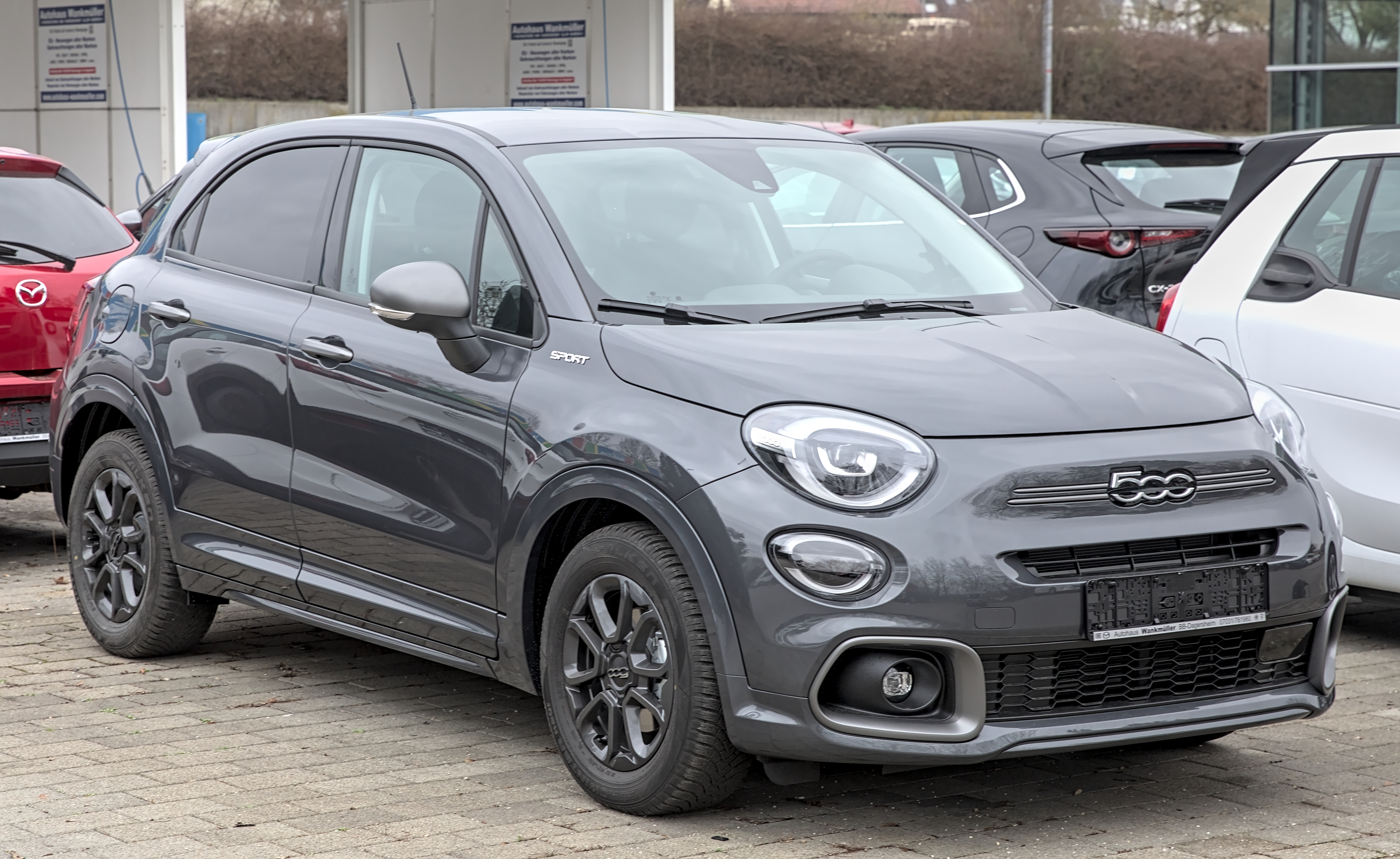
Fiat 500X

==== Small Wide 4×4 LWB ====
- Jeep Compass (2016–2025)
- Jeep Commander (2021–present)
- Alfa Romeo Tonale (2022–present)
- Dodge Hornet (2022–2026)
- Ram Rampage (2023–present)
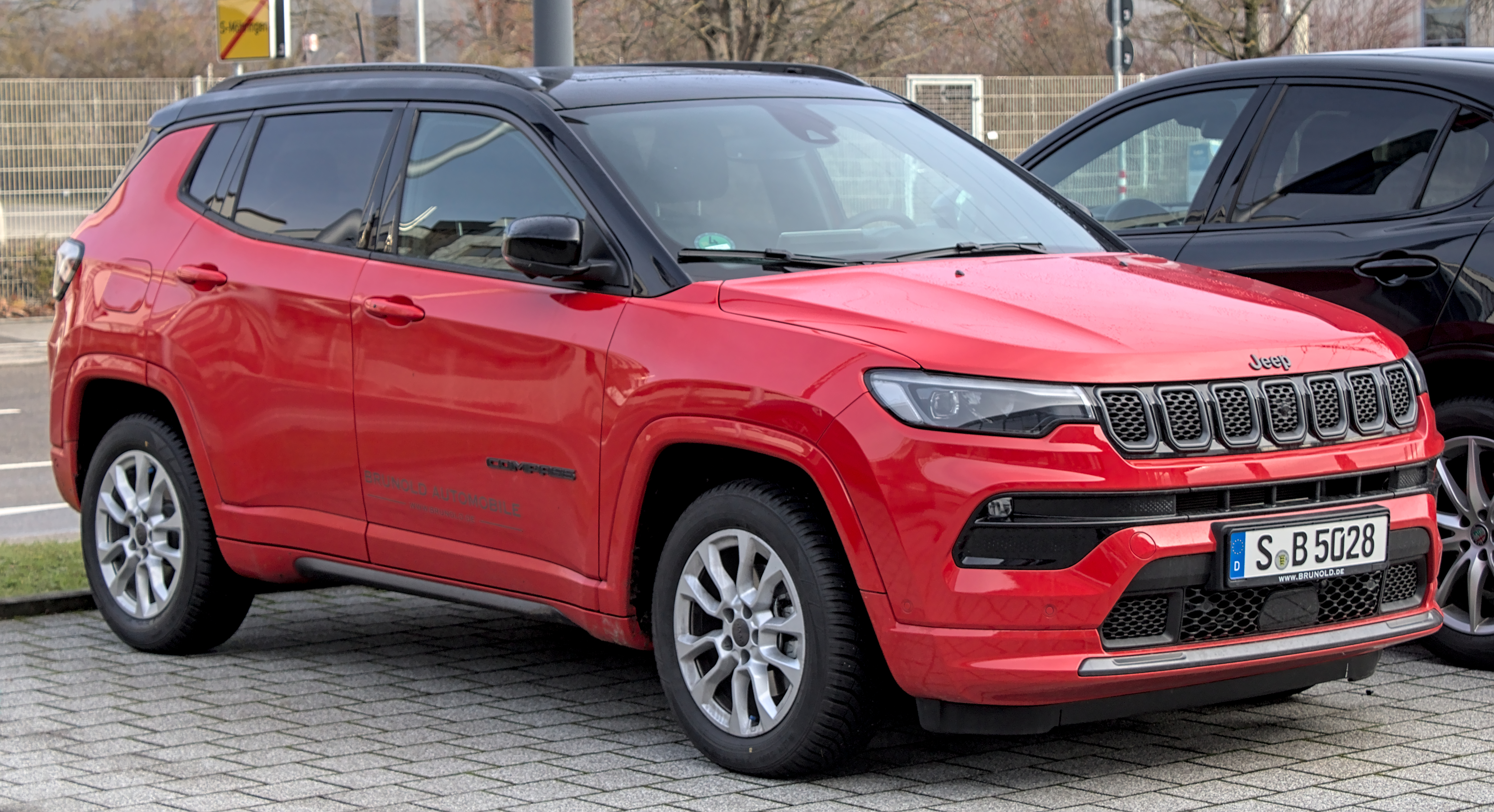
Jeep Compass

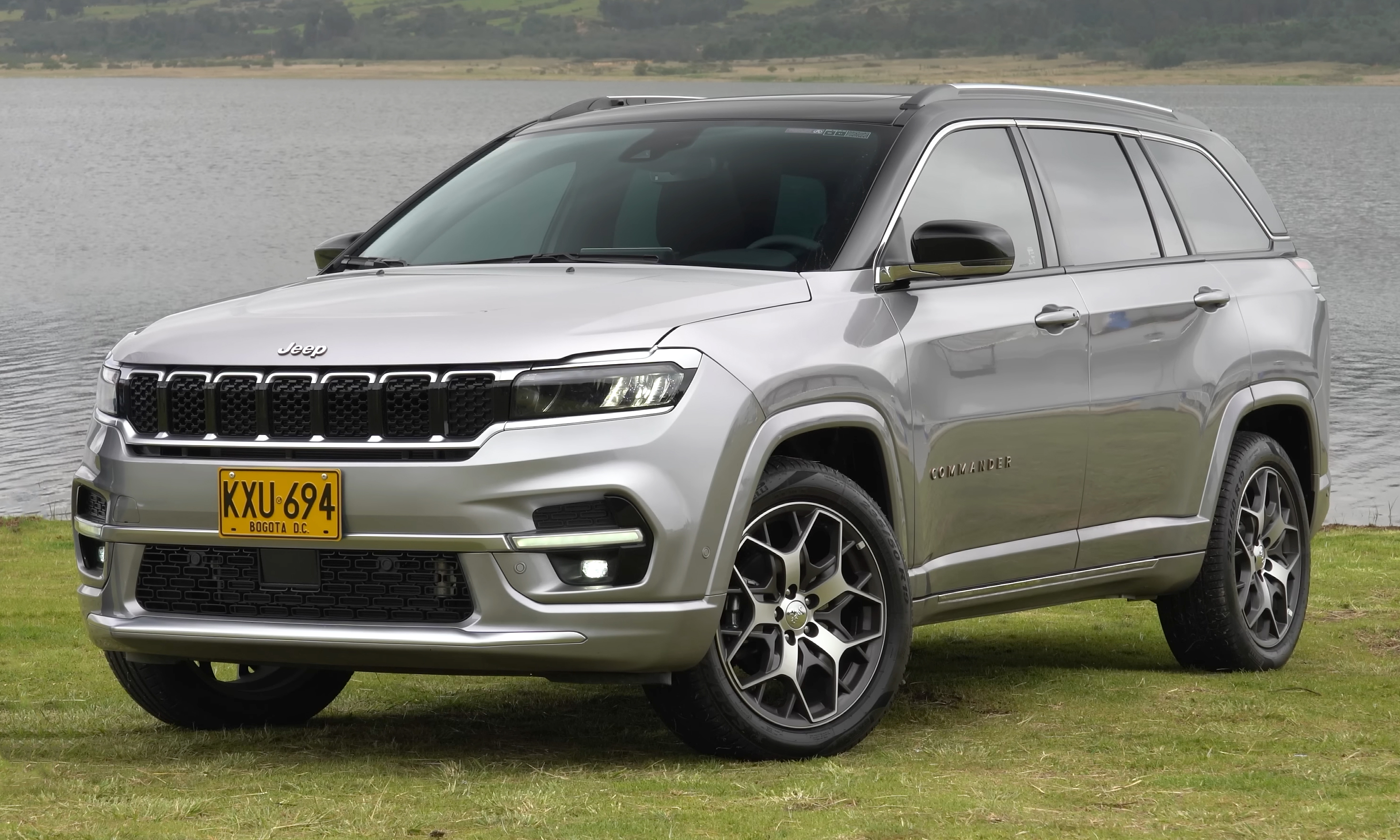
Jeep Commander (2022)

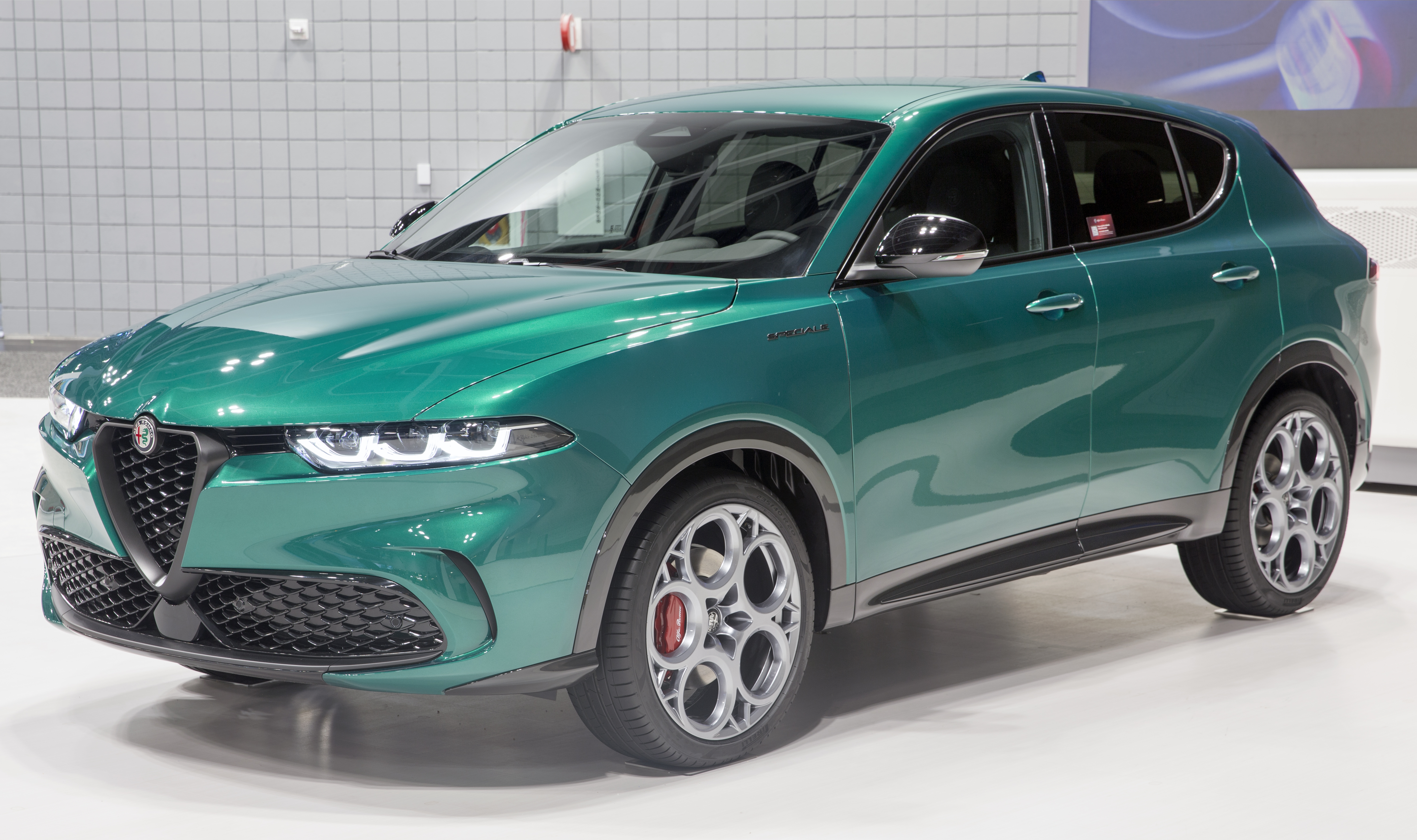
Alfa Romeo Tonale

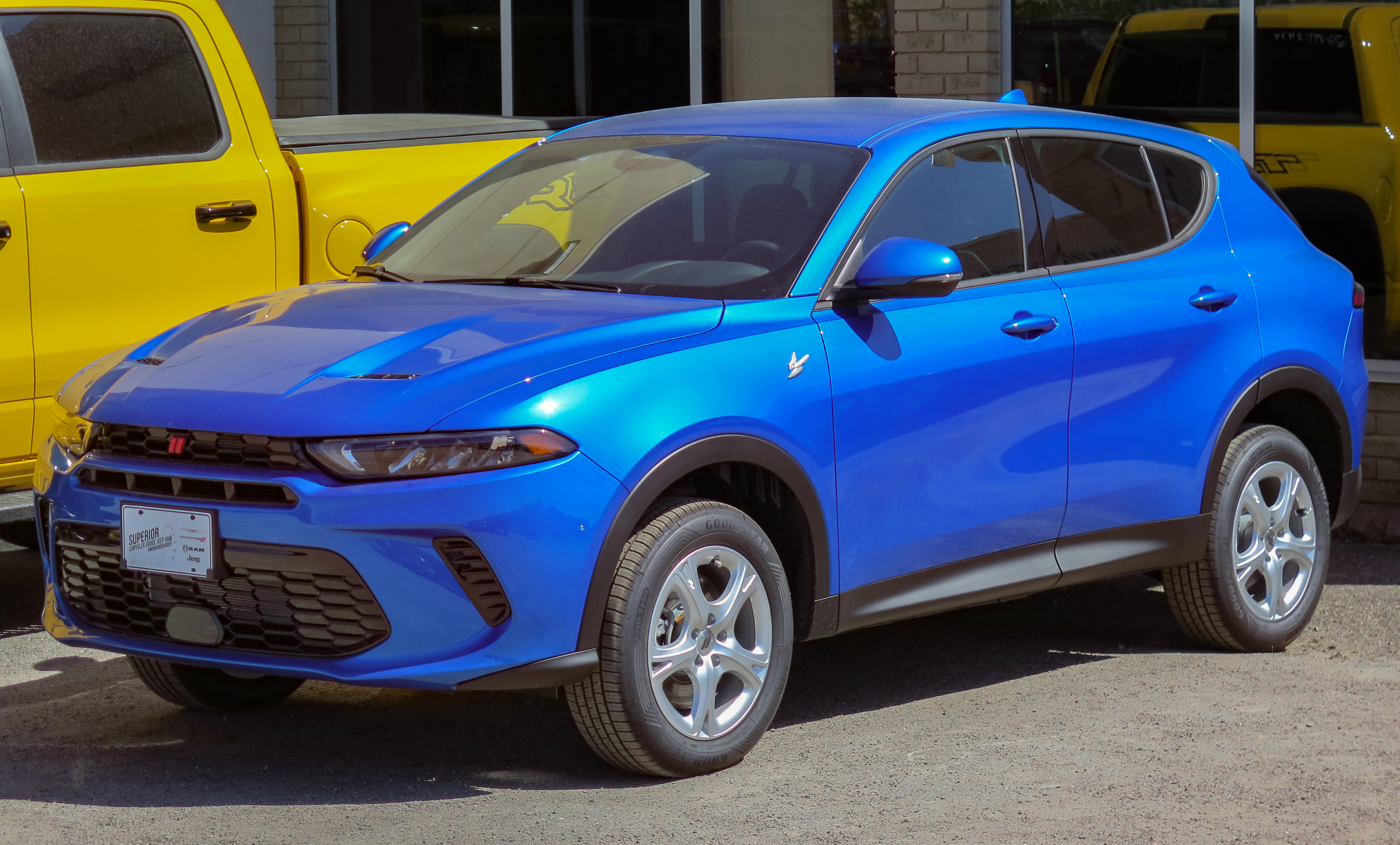
Dodge Hornet

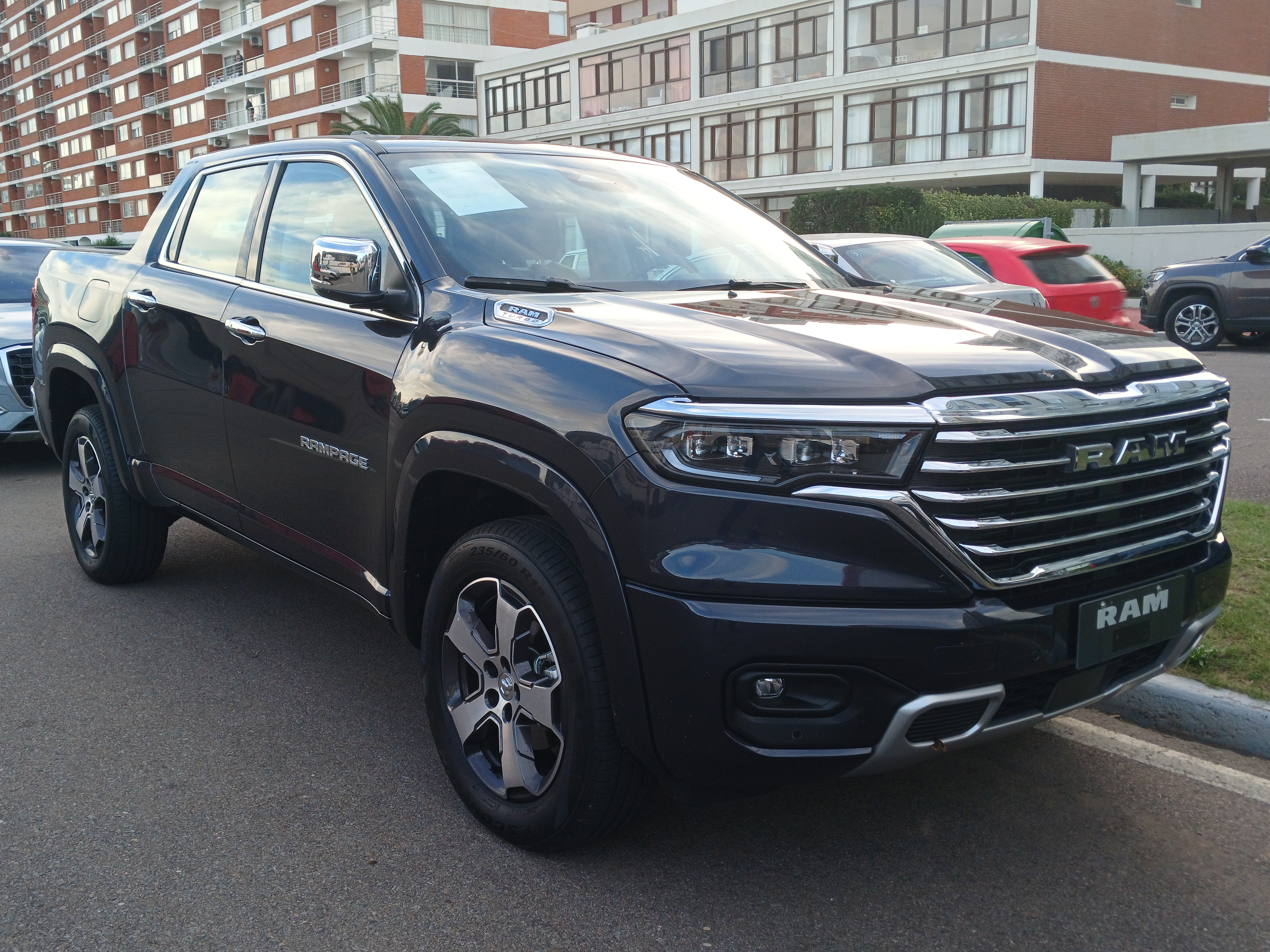
Ram Rampage
