= Smith College Campus School =

Coordinates: 42°19′16.3″N 72°38′6.3″W

Information
- Established: 1926; 100 years ago
- Grades: Kindergarten - Grade 6

Located in Northampton, Massachusetts, Campus School of Smith College is a private elementary lab school that enrolls students from surrounding nearby communities through grades K-6.

== History ==
The Campus School of Smith College was founded in 1926 by the president of Smith College, William Allan Neilson, who first established The Smith College Nursery School and The Smith College Day School, later renamed Smith College Campus School. As the school grew it needed more space so the college converted the adjacent laundry building into classrooms and connected it to the existing classroom building, Gill Hall. In 2018, the school name changed to Campus School of Smith College, or Campus School for short. Uma Thurman is considered the most famous alum.
