= Fiat 500L =

Mini MPV

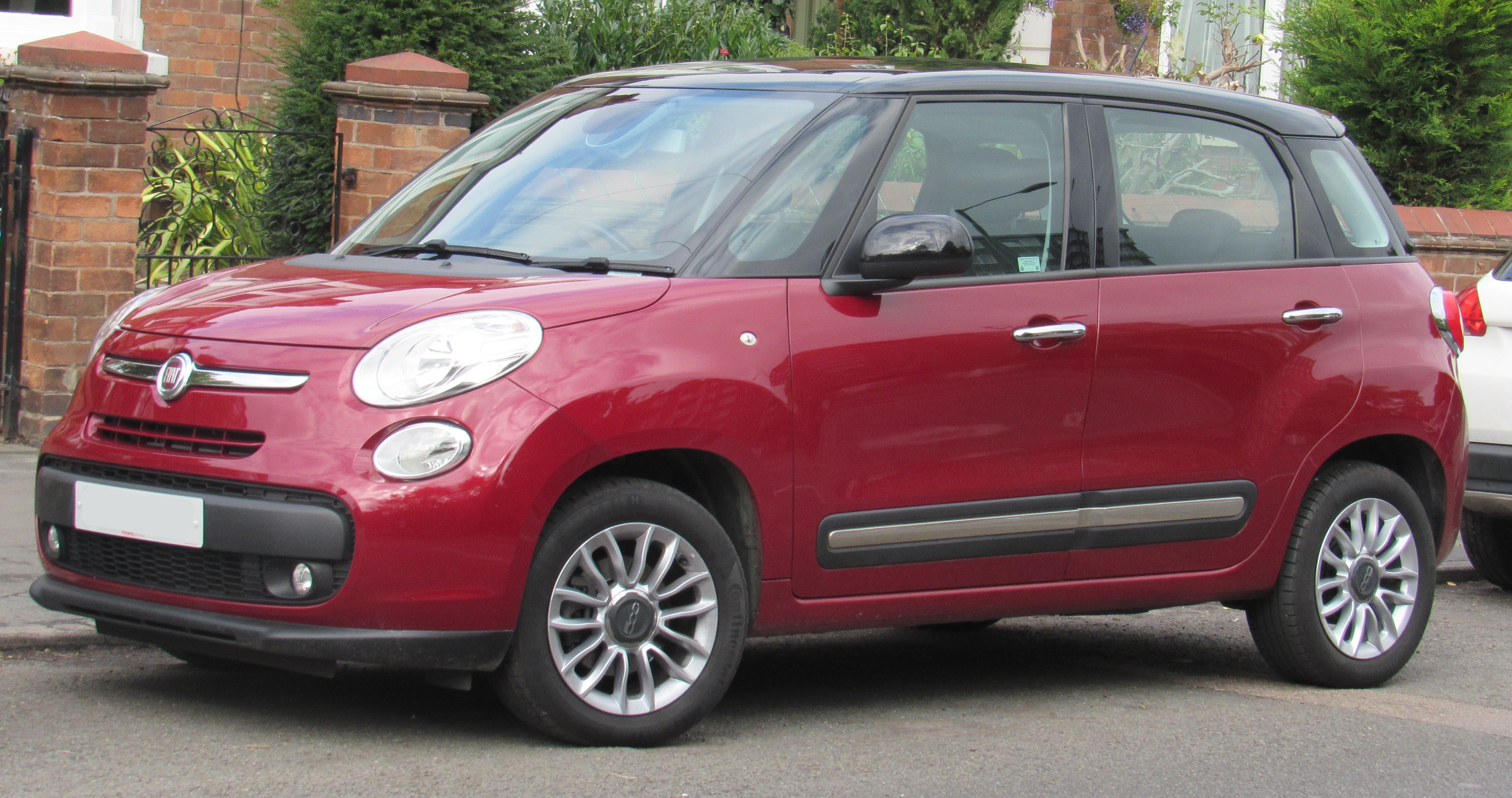

Overview
- Manufacturer: Fiat (Note: Fiat Group Automobiles (2012–2014); FCA Italy (2014–2021); Stellantis (2021–present))
- Production: May 2012–2022
- Model years: 2014–2020 (North America)
- Assembly: Serbia: Kragujevac (Fiat Serbia)
- Designer: Centro Stile Fiat: Roberto Giolito (Chief Designer); Andreas Wuppinger (Chief Designer, Exterior); Virgilio Fernandez (Chief Designer, Interior); Rossella Guasco (Color and Materials)

Body and chassis
- Class: Mini MPV
- Body style: 5-door hatchback (500L); 5-door estate (Living)
- Layout: Front-engine, front-wheel-drive
- Platform: GM Fiat Small platform
- Related: Fiat Toro; Jeep Renegade; Fiat 500X; Fiat Tipo

Powertrain
- Engine: Petrol: 0.9 L TwinAir Turbo I2; 1.4 L Fire I4; 1.4 L Fire Turbojet I4; 1.4 L Multiair Turbo I4; Petrol/CNG: 0.9 L TwinAir Turbo I2; Diesel: 1.3 L MultiJet II I4; 1.6 L Multijet I4
- Transmission: 5-speed FPT C510 manual; 6-speed FPT C635 manual; 6-speed FPT C635 dual-clutch automatic; 5-speed FPT C510 Dualogic automated manual; 6-speed Aisin AW60T-6F25 automatic

Dimensions
- Wheelbase: 2,612 mm (102.8 in)
- Length: 4,140 mm (163.0 in); 4,350 mm (171.3 in) (Living)
- Width: 1,780 mm (70.1 in)
- Height: 1,660 mm (65.4 in)
- Kerb weight: 1,245 kg (2,745 lb)-1,365 kg (3,009 lb)

Chronology
- Predecessor: Fiat Idea/Lancia Musa; Fiat Multipla
- Successor: Fiat 600 (2023)

The Fiat 500L is a car which was manufactured by Fiat Serbia from 2012 to 2022 and marketed by Fiat globally. A five-door mini MPV based on a variant of the FCA Small Wide platform, it was initially only produced in a two-row, five-seater confugration, with a lengthened three-row, seven-seater version called the 500L Living introduced in 2013 for the European market. In 2017, the 500L received an intermediate facelift, with revised front and rear fascias along with In-car entertainment updates and interior revisions. By early 2018, production reached 500,000 units. The 500L was discontinued in the North American market after model year 2020.

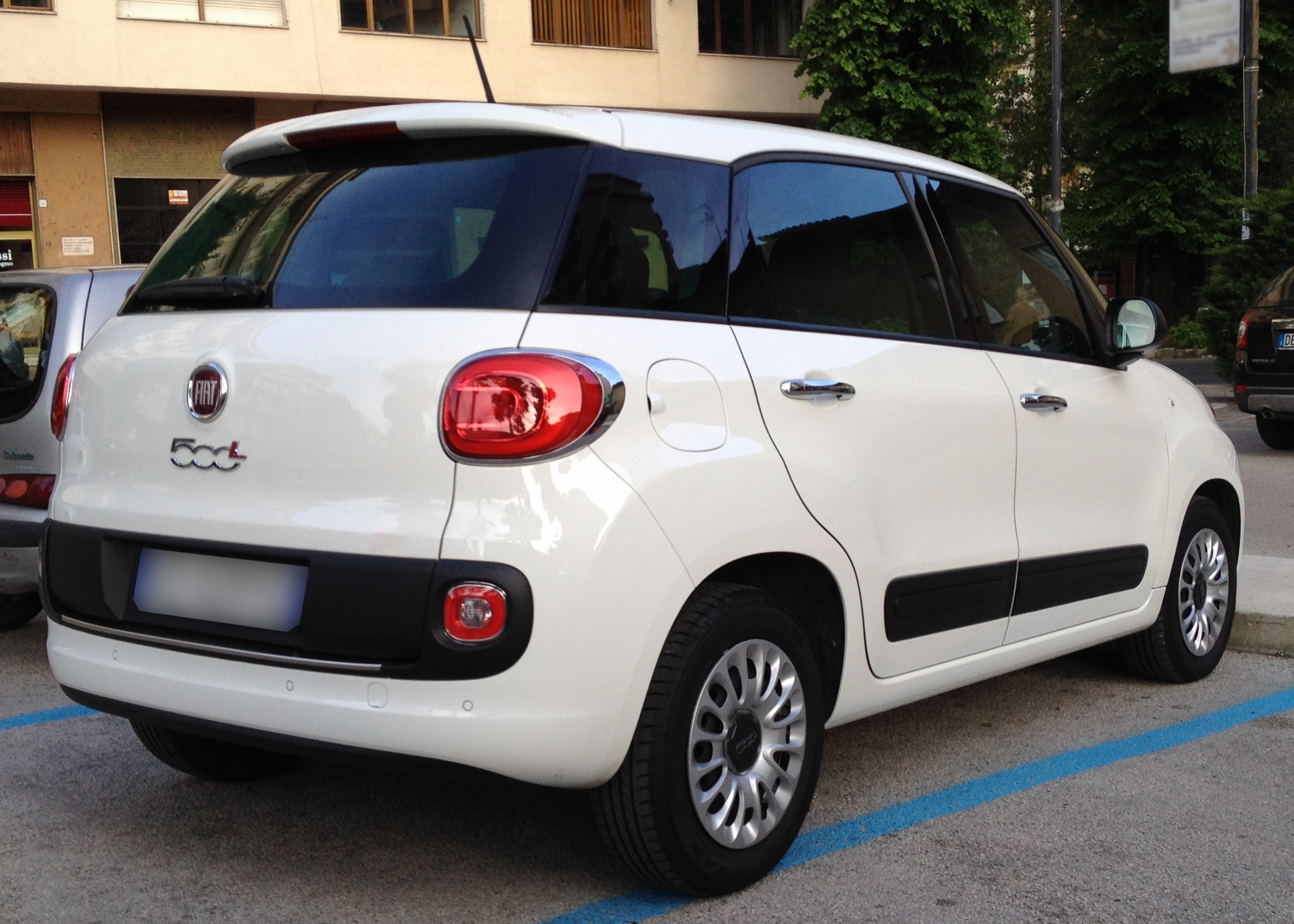
Pre-facelift 500L (Europe)

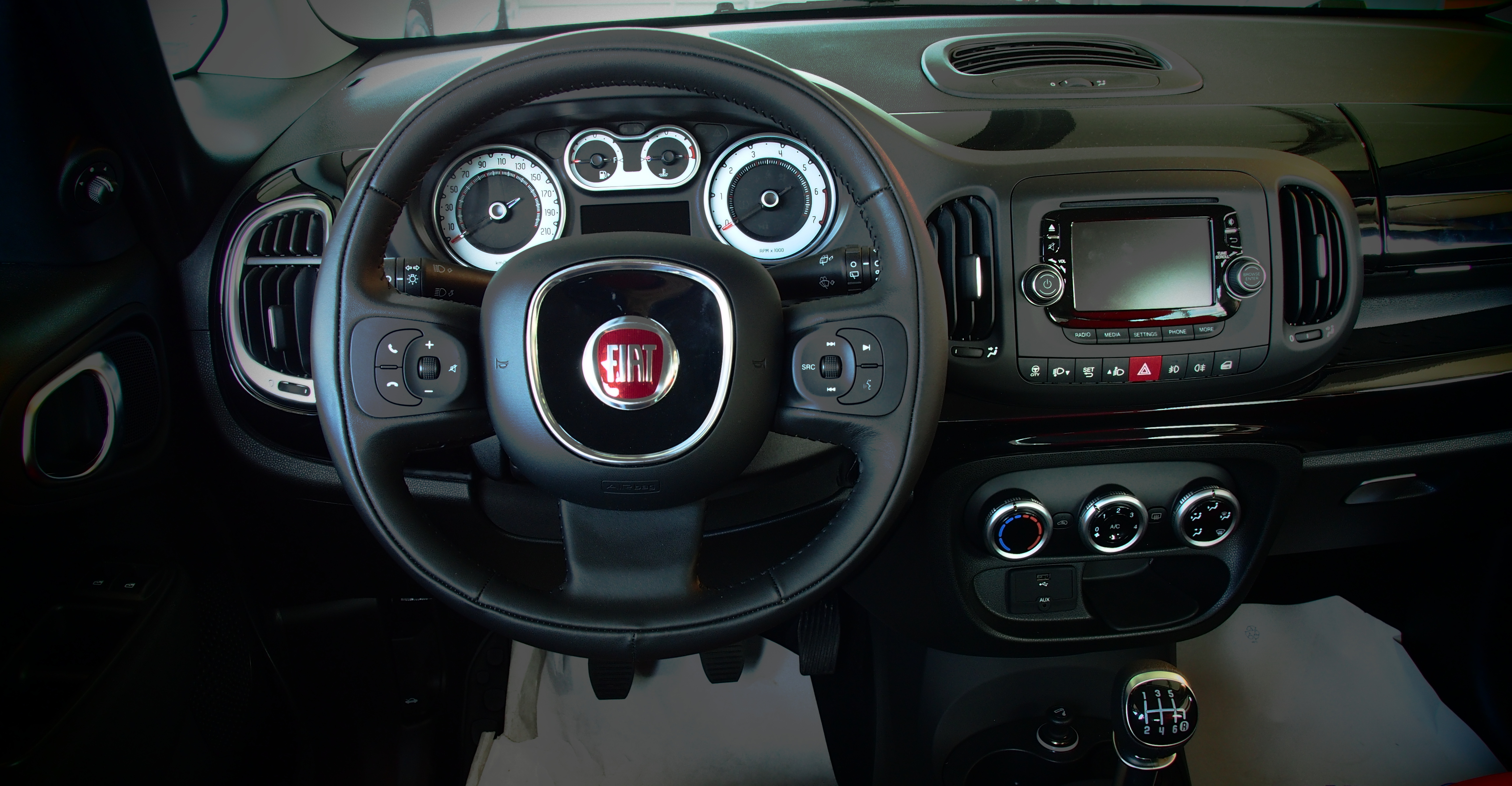
Dashboard

500L Cab Forward concept

The 500L uses Fiat's Multiair variable valve timing engine technology and monovolume, cab forward architecture: a packaging concept that prioritizes passenger and cargo volume.

The 500L derives its name from Fiat's widely known 500 models, including the original 1957 Fiat 500 and the current Fiat 500, introduced in 2007. Underscoring its increased length and overall size over other 500 variants, the suffix L denotes "large", "light" and "loft".

== Development ==
In April 2010, when Fiat released its 2010–2014 product development plan, the 500L was identified as a replacement for the Fiat Idea and its rebadged variant, the Lancia Musa—and was given the internal designation L0 or Ellezero. Two variants were projected, five and seven passenger, the latter originally targeted at North America but ultimately only marketed in Europe.

The 500L platform was based on Fiat's "Small" platform, first used with the Fiat Grande Punto and further developed since its launch in 2005. With the 500L, the platform is both longer and wider to accommodate the 500L's cab forward architecture, prioritizing interior volume and reducing of the volume of mechanical systems.

The packaging design closely follows the Lancia Megagamma concept, which Fiat had commissioned from Italdesign in 1979, for a 4-meter, high roof, high h-point, multifunctional, monospace design.

Designers of the 500L said its overall architecture was inspired by Villa Savoye, the modernist house designed in the 1930s by Le Corbusier located in Poissy, France. Fabrizio Vacca, senior interior designer with Fiat's Centro Stile in Turin described a "layered" theme with a base, a middle with expansive visibility and above that an available, very large, dual-pane panoramic sunroof.

== Design ==
As a five-door, five-passenger, two-box, high-roof B-segment MPV, the 500L is based on a variant of the GM Fiat Small platform and uses Fiat's Multiair engines, a hydraulically actuated variable valve timing (VVT) engine technology enabling "cylinder by cylinder, stroke by stroke" control of intake air directly via a gasoline engine's inlet valves.

The 500L's cab forward architecture provides a total passenger and cargo volume of 3,429 L (121.1 cu ft), and features high H-point seating, tall roof and greenhouse, split front glass (A) pillar and polycarbonate rear (D) pillar, making the Fiat 500L the first production vehicle to use polycarbonate windows. The split A-pillar and tall greenhouse contribute to the interior's wide field of visibility.

Bodywork features a reconfigurable interior system marketed as Cargo Magic Space, which includes a three-level rear cargo floor panel, fold-flat front passenger seat, and rear seating that can recline for passenger comfort, slide for/aft to reprioritize cargo and passenger volume, and fold and tumble forward to store the second row seating and maximize interior cargo volume.

The 500L's structural architecture uses 74 percent high strength steel (HSS) and complies with international safety standards. With three front-end load (crash) dissipation paths the design has wide rear door openings; roof pillars that enable a 90 percent visibility for the driver's 360° field of view. The body has a frontal area of 2.54 m^{2} (27.3 sq ft) and an aerodynamic coefficient of drag (cd) of 0.30, helped by a rear spoiler, underbody engine and rear suspension shields, and integral rear side window nolder profiles (i.e., small aerodynamic lips) to decrease pressure behind the bodywork and reduce mud and debris build-up on the rear window.

The 500L uses shock absorbers (marketed as Koni Frequency Selective Damping (FSD) Technology) designed to filter out high-frequency suspension inputs from uneven road surfaces while maintaining ride control mechanically rather than electronically.

The 500L's sunroof is 1 square metre (10.8 sq ft), the largest in its class.

An optional Beats Audio system which claims a total power of 520 watts with two 80 watt mid-woofer speakers low in the front door panels, two 40 watt speakers high in the front door panels, two 60 watt speakers in the rear door panels, an 80+80 watt subwoofer in the rear cargo area and an amplifier with DSP and 8 channels and a built-in advanced equalisation algorithm.

== Production ==
=== Introduction ===
In 2012, the 500L debuted formally at the Geneva Auto Show—followed by a media introduction at the Officine Grandi Riparazioni (OGR), the former Grand Repair Workshops of the Italian Railway, now a cultural center located at Corso Castelfidardo 22 in Turin—on 4 July, the day of the year when Fiat has historically introduced its 500 models. The introduction presentation was built around the 500L themes of Large (a large MPV within a 4.1 meter footprint), Light (a light eco-footprint), and Loft (an expansive, lofty interior).

Fiat Serbia inaugurated its reconstructed and renovated facilities in Kragujevac in April 2011—with production commencing 26 May 2012.

The 500L went on sale in Italy in September 2012, with sales beginning in October 2012 for the rest of Europe.

=== Manufacture ===
Manufacture of the 500L began at Fiat's Kragujevac plant in Serbia,—a joint venture (JV) between Fiat Chrysler Automobiles (FCA) which owns 67% of the operation and the Republic of Serbia, which owns the remainder. The facilities had previously served as the factory and headquarters for Zastava Automobiles.

Between 2010 and 2012, FCA invested more than €1B and three years to upgrade the plant infrastructure, restore its buildings, develop new production departments and install state of the art machinery and production systems. A co-located automotive supplier park includes sub-works for Magneti Marelli (exhaust and catalytic converters), Johnson Controls MM (instrument panels, interior, interior parts and plastic parts), Magneti Marelli (bumpers and spoilers), Dräxlmaier (electrical), with other works at the nearby Grosnica Supplier Park, including Johnson Controls (seats), PMC (suspension systems, sheet metal stampings and chassis assemblies), SIGIT (rubber and plastic parts) as well as HTL.

500L production was originally scheduled for manufacture at the Italian Mirafiori plant in Turin, but Fiat instead moved production to Serbia.

Approximately one percent of 500L production is expected to be sold in Serbia, with 90% exported from Serbia via the port of Bar, Montenegro.

In 2013, a ship carrying the first 3,000 Fiat 500L units for the North American market docked in the port of Baltimore to unload its first consignment, subsequently delivering the remainder of its cargo to the Canadian port of Halifax.

=== Trim levels ===
Fiat markets the 500L in various trim levels worldwide, beginning in 2014 in the US with four trim levels: Pop, Easy, Trekking, and Lounge—subsequently consolidated to three levels with model year 2017. Trim levels available globally include Sport in Canada in lieu of Easy—and Pop Star in Europe. Engine and transmission options vary by country and model year. Available transmissions include a six-speed manual, dual-clutch transmission (DCT), and an Aisin six-speed traditional torque converter automatic.

The entry level trim, typically marketed as Pop, includes electrically operated windows and door locks, Uconnect 5.0 system with 5-inch touchscreen interface, handsfree calling, Bluetooth-streaming audio, voice-controllable radio, hill start assist and a reconfigurable interior design marketed as Magic Cargo Space, which includes a three-level rear cargo floor panel, fold-flat front passenger seat as well as for-aft sliding, fold and tumble, reclining rear seating. Typically no option packages are offered.

Upper trim levels (variously marketed as Easy, Sport, Pop Star or Lounge) include more standard features and numerous option packages, including satellite navigation, leather trim, heated front seats, dual-pane panoramic sunroof or fixed sunroof (Europe), 6.5" Uconnect system, roof colour options, fog lights, power outlets, illuminated visor mirrors and chrome trim.

Trekking models, first presented at the 2012 LA Auto Show feature revised front and rear fascias, optional two-tone Nero/Marrone (black/brown) interior upholstery and distinct options packages. In 2017, the Fiat 500L Trekking is renamed Fiat 500L Weekend in some markets, including France.

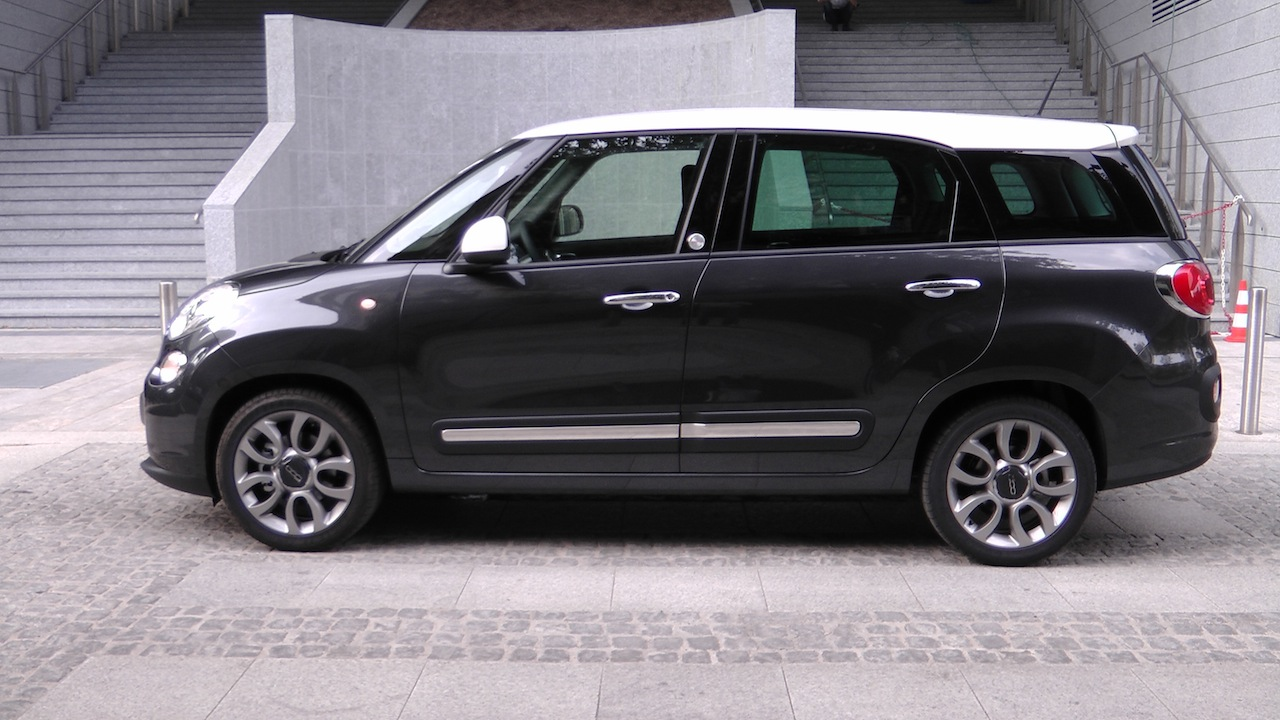
Fiat 500L Living, a longer 7 seats version.

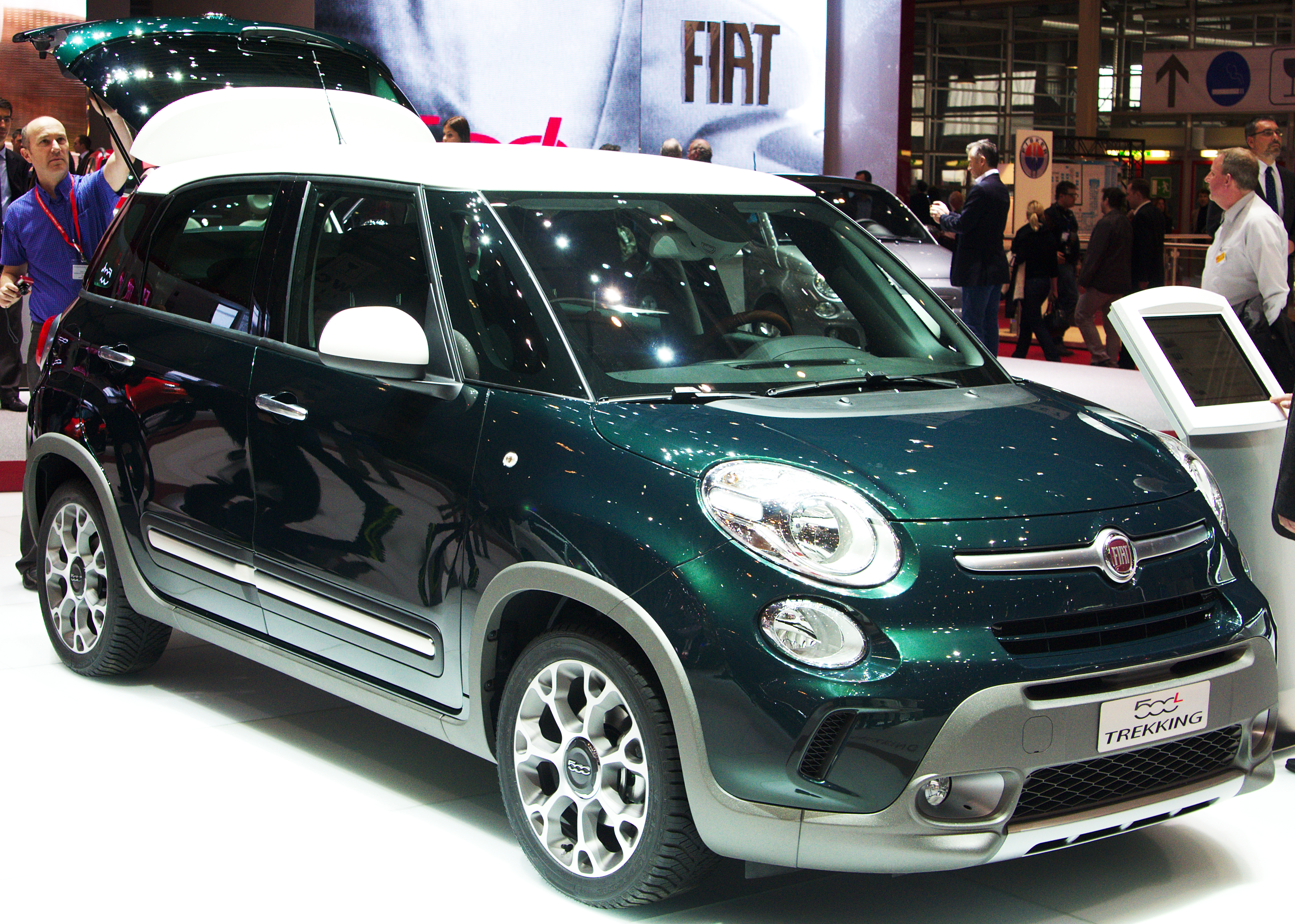
Fiat 500L Trekking

To complement the regular length 500L, codenamed Fiat L0 (or Ellezero) (design code 330), in 2013 Fiat began marketing a lengthened seven-seat variant in Europe known as the 500L Living (or MPW in Ireland and the UK), developed under project code L1, Elleuno, or design code 351.

The 500L was the first production car with an optional in-vehicle espresso machine.

In 2021, new 500 family Hey Google series debuts with Google assistant, so customers can connect to their car even when they are away from it, using their own voice to request and receive information on the car and to interact with it. They can do so via their smartphone or the Google Nest Hub.

=== 2017 update ===
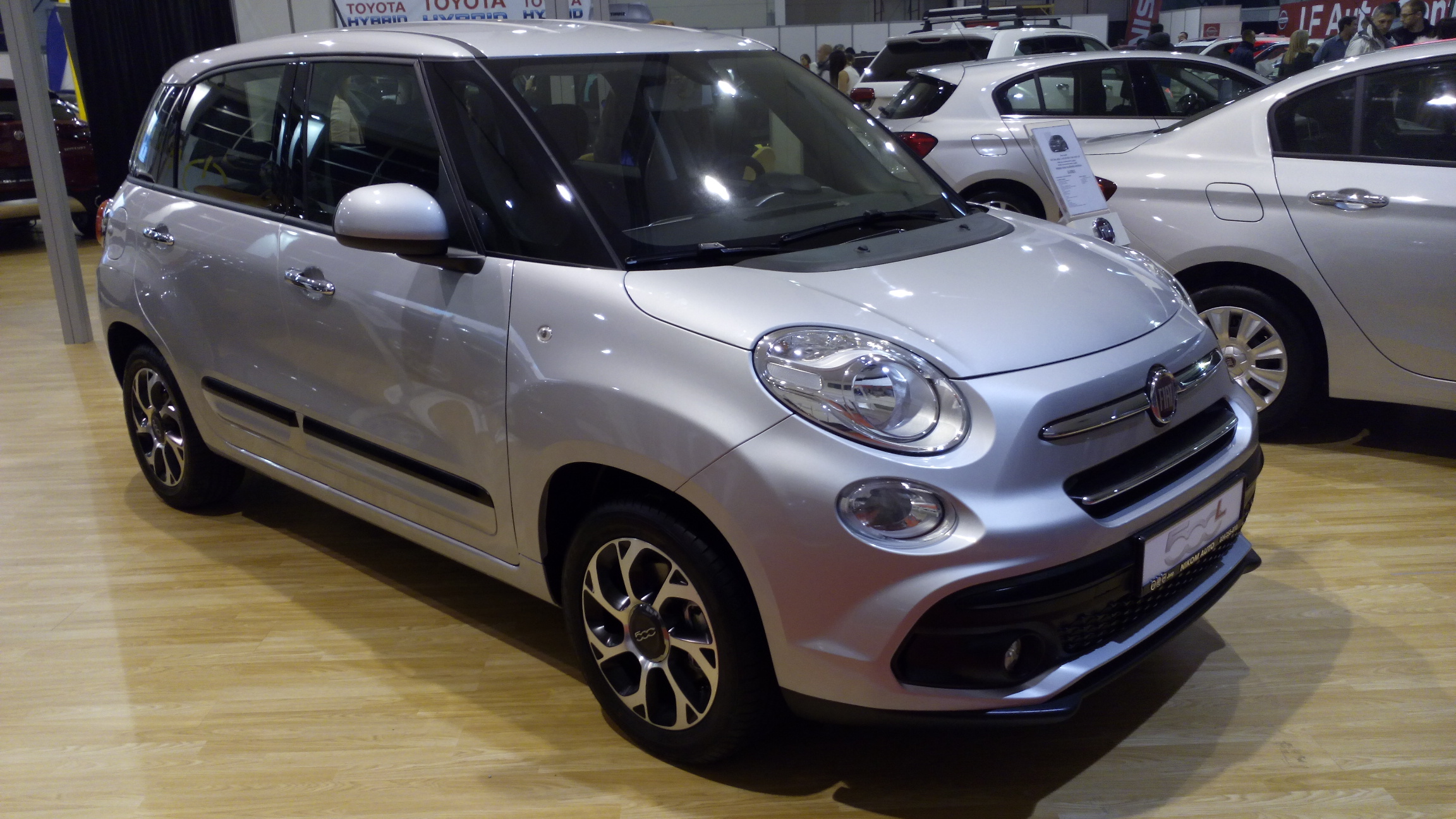
2017 Fiat 500L facelift

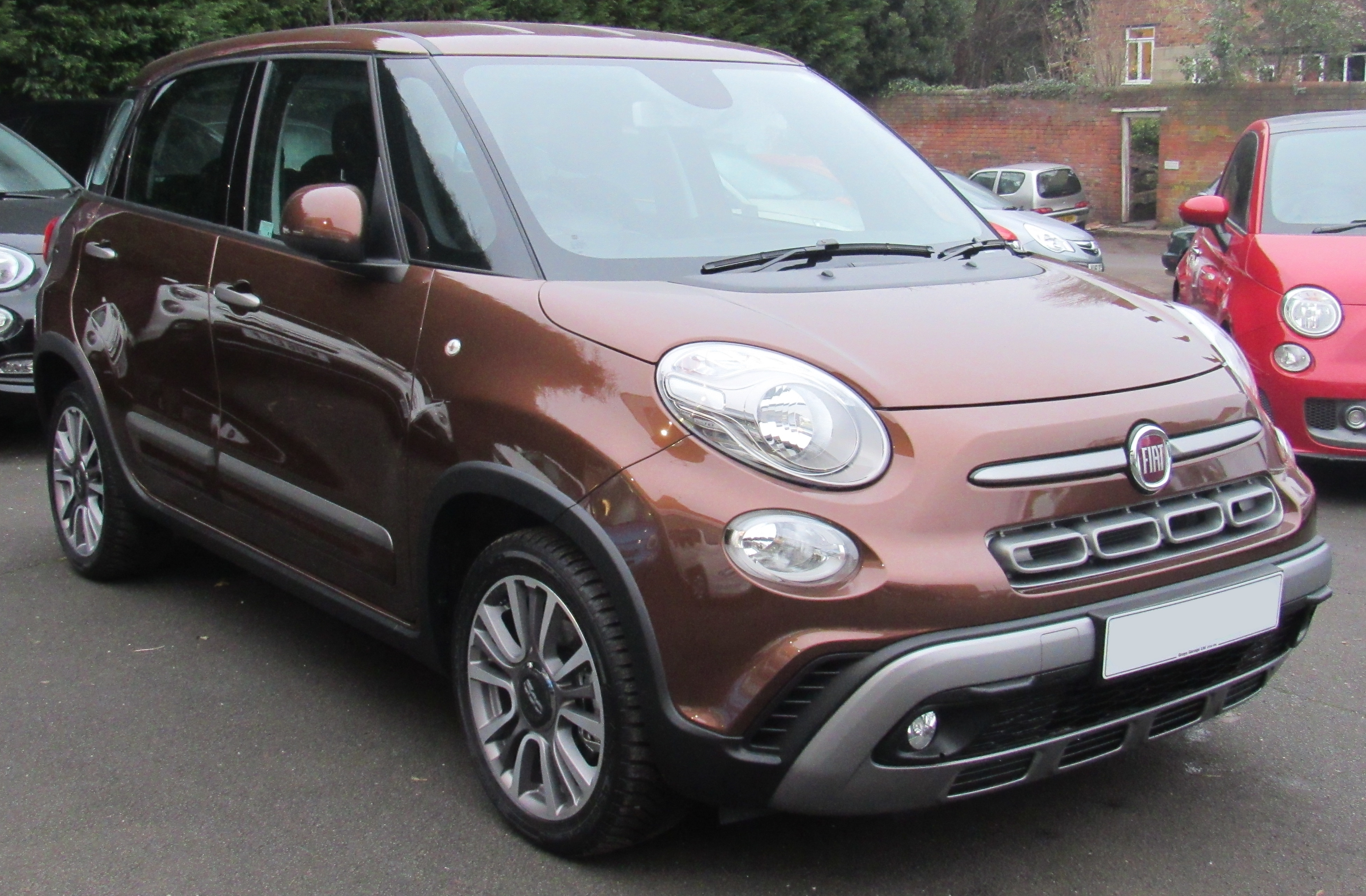
Fiat 500L Cross

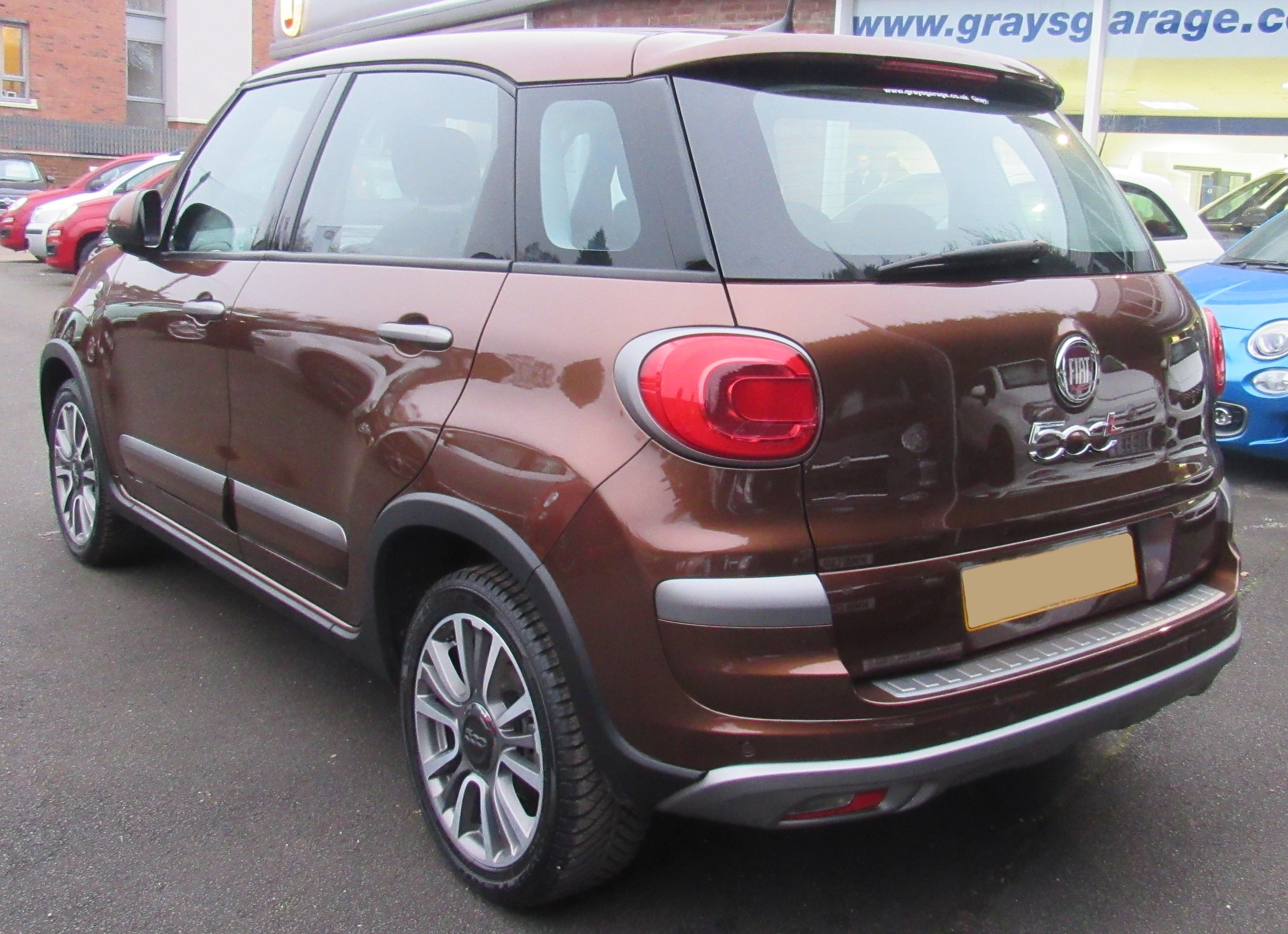
Fiat 500L Cross

For the 2018 model year, all models received slightly revised exterior styling, as well as interior revisions, including a TFT color instrument display screen centered on the instrument panel, replacing the previous monochrome LCD instrument display screen.

A new Uconnect 4C 7.0 infotainment system, replaces the Uconnect 3 5.0BT and Uconnect 3C 6.5N units. The new unit includes an AM-FM radio tuner with Radio Data System (RDS), SiriusXM Satellite Radio.

Engine and transmission options include either a 6-speed manual or Aisin 6-speed automatic, the latter as the sole transmission for the North American market.

With the facelift, the seven-seat model was renamed the 500L Wagon (including in Ireland and in the UK, where pre-facelift models had a different name than anywhere else). The Fiat 500L Trekking (Fiat 500L Weekend in France) was renamed the Fiat 500L Cross Look (Fiat 500L Cross in France, and later Fiat 500L City Cross, and then just 500L).

=== Engines ===
For most markets, the 500L is available with a range of petrol and diesel engines: the 2-cylinder 0.9 L Twin Air and the 4-cylinder 1.4 L petrol, and the 1.3 L and 1.6 L MultiJet II common rail diesel engines. In North America the 500L is available with only a single 1.4 L turbo petrol engine, not available in Europe. A "Natural Power" methane powered version of the 0.9 L Twin Air is available in selected European markets.

All petrol models are equipped with a 6-speed manual transmission, with an automatic option only in North America. The 1.3 L diesel is available with a 5-speed manual or a 5-speed automated manual transmission called "MTA Dualogic". The 1.6 diesel is only available with a 6-speed manual.

The 1.6 MultiJet II 120 PS (88 kW; 118 hp) and 1.4 T-Jet 120 PS (88 kW; 118 hp) engine versions for the 500L, 500L Trekking and 500L Living were unveiled in Frankfurt Motor Show 2013.

For 2014 three new engine options (1.6 MultiJet II (120PS) turbo diesel, 1.4 T-Jet (120PS) petrol, 1.4 Turbo LPG) were announced for all 500L derivatives. A 1.4 turbo LPG engine models of 2014 Fiat 500L would be available at later date.

| Model | Engine | Fuel | Transmission | Power | Torque | Emissions CO_{2} |
|---|---|---|---|---|---|---|
| 0.9 TwinAir Natural Power | 875 cc I2 | Petrol/CNG | 6-speed manual | 80 PS (59 kW; 79 hp) at 5,500 rpm | 140 N⋅m (103 lb⋅ft) at 2,000 rpm | 105 g/km |
| 0.9 TwinAir Turbo | 875 cc I2 | Petrol | 6-speed manual | 105 PS (77 kW; 104 hp) at 5,500 rpm | 145 N⋅m (107 lb⋅ft) at 2,000 rpm | 112 g/km |
| 1.4 16V FIRE | 1368 cc I4 | Petrol/LPG | 6-speed manual | 95 PS (70 kW; 94 hp) at 6,000 rpm | 127 N⋅m (94 lb⋅ft) at 4,500 rpm | 145 g/km |
| 1.3 16V MultiJet II | 1248 cc I4 | Diesel | 5-speed manual | 85 PS (63 kW; 84 hp) at 3,500 rpm | 200 N⋅m (148 lb⋅ft) at 1,500 rpm | 110 g/km |
| 1.3 16V MultiJet II | 1248 cc I4 | Diesel | 5-speed automatic | 85 PS (63 kW; 84 hp) at 3,500 rpm | 200 N⋅m (148 lb⋅ft) at 1,500 rpm | 105 g/km |
| 1.6 16V MultiJet II | 1598 cc I4 | Diesel | 6-speed manual | 105 PS (77 kW; 104 hp) at 3,750 rpm | 320 N⋅m (236 lb⋅ft) at 1,750 rpm | 117 g/km |
| 1.6 16V MultiJet II | 1598 cc I4 | Diesel | 6-speed manual | 120 PS (88 kW; 120 hp) at 3,750 rpm | 320 N⋅m (236 lb⋅ft) at 1,750 rpm | 120 g/km |
| 1.4 FIRE T-Jet | 1368 cc I4 | Petrol/LPG | 6-speed manual | 120 PS (88 kW; 120 hp) at 5,000 rpm | 206 N⋅m (152 lb⋅ft) at 2,000 rpm | 145 g/km |
| 1.4 Turbo MultiAir | 1368 cc I4 | Petrol | 6-speed manual | 162 PS (119 kW; 160 hp) at 5,500 rpm | 250 N⋅m (184 lb⋅ft) at 2,500 rpm | 132 g/km |
| 1.4 Turbo MultiAir | 1368 cc I4 | Petrol | 6-speed automatic | 162 PS (119 kW; 160 hp) at 5,500 rpm | 250 N⋅m (184 lb⋅ft) at 2,500 rpm | 123 g/km |

*Source:

=== Safety ===
The 500L has disc brakes on all wheels.

==== Euro NCAP ====
Euro NCAP test results Fiat 500L (2012)
| Test | Points | % |
|---|---|---|
| Overall: | 5 /5 stars | |
| Adult occupant: | 34 | 94% |
| Child occupant: | 38 | 78% |
| Pedestrian: | 23 | 65% |
| Safety assist: | 5 | 71% |

==== IIHS ====
The 2014 Fiat 500L was tested by the Insurance Institute for Highway Safety (IIHS), and it received a Top Safety Pick award:

IIHS 500L scores (2014–2020):
| Small overlap frontal offset (Driver) | Poor |
| Moderate overlap frontal offset | Good |
| Side impact (original test) | Good |
| Roof strength | Good |
| Head restraints & seats | Good |

=== Marketing ===
At the time of introduction, Fiat published a 96-page, multi-language book tracing the design of the vehicle. For the U.S. introduction of the 500L, Fiat launched a commercial created by the Doner Company filmed in Old Salem, North Carolina and starring Bryce Pinkham. Titled "Italian Invasion," the ad showed Paul Revere noticing an Italian rather than British Invasion.

For the 2013 launch of the 500L Trekking, Fiat broadcast a commercial by the agency Leo Burnett promoting its suitability for everyday adventuring.

Fiat 500L models were used in 2014 Sochi Winter Olympics by the Italian team.

FCA donated eight dark grey 500Ls for Pope Francis's 2015 visit to the United States, two of which the Pope rode in. After serving the Pope, the cars were donated to organizations involved in the Pope's visit, including the Archdioceses of Washington, Philadelphia, and New York.

=== Discontinuation ===
The 7-seat 500L was discontinued in 2021. It exited some major export markets some years before (United Kingdom in mid-2018, France in late 2019).

=== Sales ===
| Year | Europe | Italy | US | Canada | Mexico |
|---|---|---|---|---|---|
| 2012 | 10,494 | | | | |
| 2013 | 74,536 | 38,229 | 6,861 | 899 | |
| 2014 | 94,114 | 51,256 | 12,413 | 2,461 | |
| 2015 | 85.357 | 49,918 | 7,863 | 1,948 | 274 |
| 2016 | 82,150 | 54,710 | 3,116 | 303 | 316 |
| 2017 | 63,100 | 46,450 | 1,664 | 42 | 143 |
| 2018 | 50,224 | 34,064 | 1,413 | 12 | 52 |
| 2019 | 36,495 | 29,414 | 772 | 16 | 50 |
| 2020 | 21,883 | 18,975 | 475 | 11 | 18 |
| 2021 | 19,689 | 18,296 | | | |
| 2022 | 15,090 | 9,577 | | | |

The 500L was the best-selling car in Serbia in 2013 and from 2015 to 2017. Serbia is not included in above Europe figures.

=== Concept models ===
2013 SEMA concepts: Two special versions of the 500L were unveiled in 2013 SEMA Show with a "surf and turf" theme. The 500L Adventurer is a version of 5-seat Fiat 500L with bright white body colour, with Mopar roof rails and a roof basket, and many other accessories from the Mopar range. The 500L Thalassa is based on the Fiat 500 Beach Cruiser from 2012, with bright orange body work and 18" orange wheels and other Mopar accessories.

2014 Fiat 500L Beats Edition: The Beats Edition was produced in association with artist and record producer Dr. Dre, Interscope Geffen A&M Records chairman and record producer Jimmy Iovine, with two-tone grey/black livery in matt or gloss finish and new interior trim. It went on sale in spring 2014 Italy, and subsequently in other markets.
