= Fully Integrated Robotised Engine =

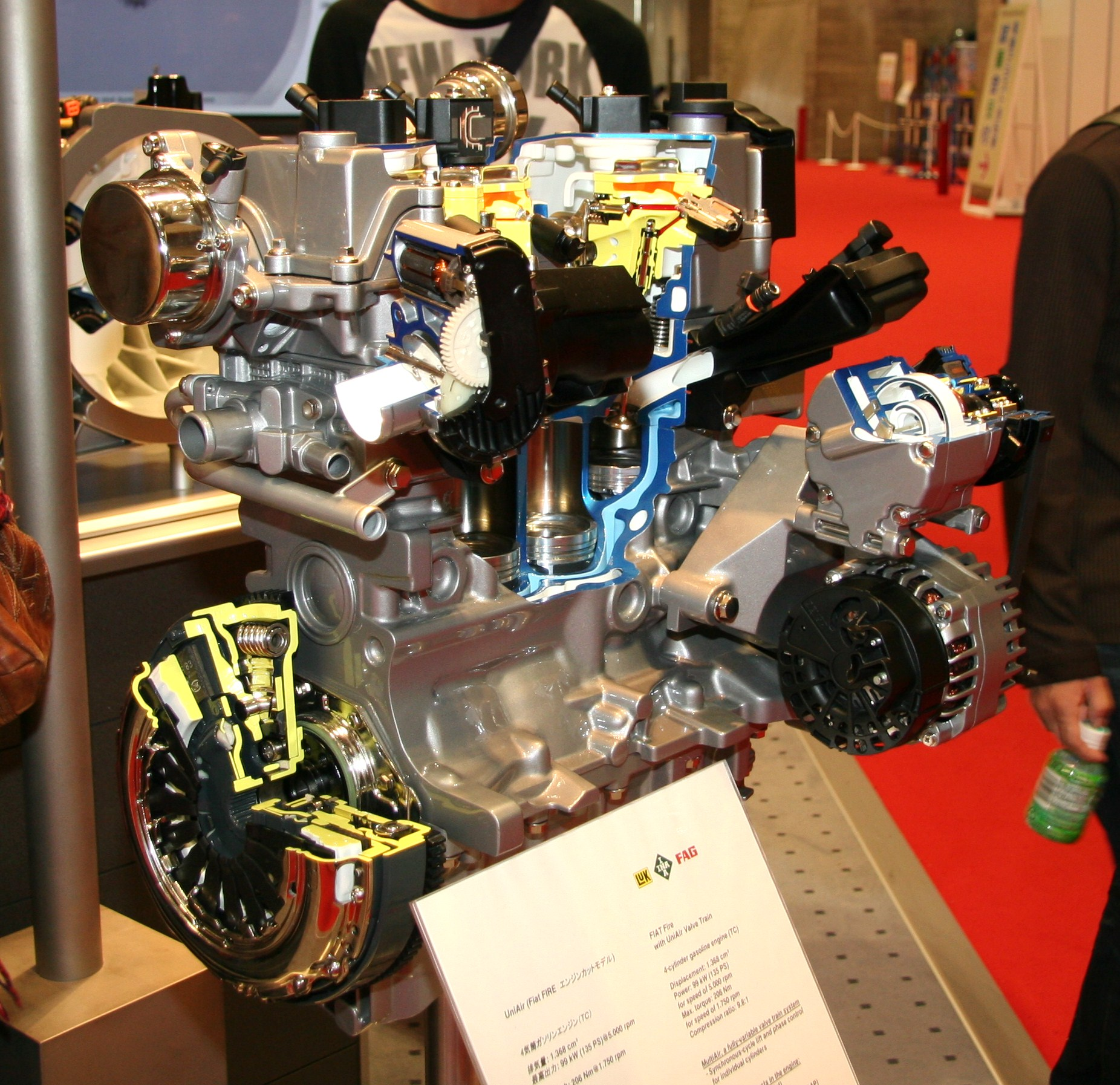

Overview
- Manufacturer: Fiat Auto (1985–2005); Fiat Powertrain Technologies (2005–2011); Fiat Group Automobiles (2011–2014); FCA Italy (2014–2021); Stellantis Italy (2021–present)
- Designer: Stefano Iacoponi, Rodolfo Bonetto
- Also called: FIRE; Starjet; Super-FIRE; T-Jet; Fire Multi-Air
- Production: 1985–>05/2021; Tot.Prod.: 23.233.856 unid. (Fiat Auto S.p.A); 1985–>2025 (Fiat-Chrysler/FCA Group); (Stellantis)

Layout
- Configuration: I4
- Displacement: 0.8 L (769 cc); 1.0 L (999 cc); 1.1 L (1,108 cc); 1.2 L (1,242 cc); 1.4 L (1,368 cc)
- Cylinder bore: 65 mm (2.56 in); 70 mm (2.76 in); 70.8 mm (2.79 in); 72 mm (2.83 in)
- Piston stroke: 58 mm (2.3 in); 64.9 mm (2.56 in); 72 mm (2.8 in); 78.9 mm (3.11 in); 84 mm (3.3 in)
- Cylinder block material: Cast iron
- Cylinder head material: aluminium
- Valvetrain: SOHC 2 valves x cyl.; DOHC 4 valves x cyl.; MultiAir
- Valvetrain drive system: Belt

Combustion
- Turbocharger: In some 1.4-litre versions
- Fuel system: Carburetor; Single-point injection; Multi-point fuel injection; Sequential multi-port FI
- Fuel type: Petrol, Flex-fuel, Ethanol, LPG, CNG
- Oil system: Wet sump
- Cooling system: Water-cooled

Output
- Power output: 34–180 PS (25–132 kW)

Emissions
- Emissions control systems: EGR

Chronology
- Predecessor: 100 series
- Successor: GSE (FireFly)

The FIRE (for "Fully Integrated Robotised Engine") is a series of automobile engines from Fiat Powertrain Technologies, built in FCA's Termoli, Betim and also in Dundee, MI (only in 1.4 Multiair versions) plants. It was designed by Italian designer Rodolfo Bonetto. It was constructed by robot assembly plants ("Robogate") to reduce costs.

The FIRE series replaced the old Fiat 100 series overhead valve engines in the mid-1980s. Mechanically, they are simple straight-four engines with five main bearings crankshaft and overhead cam heads. The original 999 cc version consists of only 273 separate parts (95 less than the 903 cc 100 series) and weighs 69 kg (152 lb), 9 kg (20 lb) less than the 100 series.

Since 1985, it has been constructed in different versions. Displacements range from 0.8 to 1.4 L; 46.9 to 83.5 cu in (769 to 1,368 cc). In addition to the 8 valve versions, there are "Super-FIRE" 1.2 and 1.4 L; 75.8 and 83.5 cu in (1,242 and 1,368 cc) 16 valve versions.

The "Super-FIRE" which uses 16 valves and was available in 1.0 L; 61.0 cu in (999 cc) (Brazil) and 1.2 L; 75.8 cu in (1,242 cc) (Brazil & Europe) displacements.

The 1.4 L; 83.5 cu in (1,368 cc) variation introduced in 2003 was available in both 8 and 16 valves. In 2005 Fiat introduced a version of the 16v incorporating port deactivation (PDA) and exhaust gas recirculation (EGR). This unit is frequently referred to as the "StarJet" engine. One year later, a turbocharged variety of the StarJet was introduced under the name "T-Jet", and a MultiAir (adding electro-hydraulic intake valve driving, with variable timing, lift and profile) version was added in 2009, available in either naturally aspirated and turbocharged forms. It reached 190 PS on the Abarth 695 Biposto.

The FIRE was originally a carbureted engine, and later progressed to single-point injection (SPI), then to multi-point fuel injection (MPI), using sequential multi-port fuel injection (SMPI) today. It was used in the 750 Formula in a slightly modified state.

Brazilian production started in 2000 with the "Super-FIRE" 1.2 16V (80 PS), was extended until 2006 with 1.0 8V (54 PS), 1.0 16V (69 PS), 1.2 8V (66 PS) and 1.4 8V (80 PS). By 2016, the two "last Super-FIRE" being produced in Brazil were the reworked (New pistons and crankshaft) 1.0 8V (77 PS) and the 1.4 8V VVT (90 PS), both running on petrol or ethanol fuels.

Starting in 2016, it was being replaced by the GSE (FireFly) engine family. Production eventually ended in 2021, after 23,233,856 units had been built.

== List of FIRE engines ==
The FIRE engine has been available in the following displacements:

- 0.8 L (769 cc) - 65 mm × 58 mm (2.6 in × 2.3 in) bore x stroke
  - SOHC 8V 34 PS (25 kW) (1986–1992)
- 1.0 L (999 cc) - 70 mm × 64.9 mm (2.76 in × 2.56 in) bore x stroke
  - 8V 45 PS (33 kW) (1986–1993)
  - 8V SPI 45 PS (33 kW) (1987–2003)
  - DOHC 16V SMPI 60 PS (44 kW) (1998–2003, Brazil only)
  - 8V SMPI Flex-fuel 77 PS (57 kW) (2005–current, Brazil only)
- 1.1 L (1,108 cc) - 70 mm × 72 mm (2.8 in × 2.8 in) bore x stroke
  - 8V 55 PS (40 kW) (1983–1993)
  - 8V SPI 50–55 PS (37–40 kW) (1993–2000)
  - 8V SMPI 55 PS (40 kW) (2001–2010)
- 1.2 L (1,242 cc) - 70.8 mm × 78.9 mm (2.79 in × 3.11 in) bore x stroke
  - 8V SPI 60 PS (44 kW) (1993–1999)
  - 8V MPI 75 PS (55 kW) (1993–1999)
  - 8V SMPI 60 PS (44 kW) (1993–2009)
  - 8V SMPI VVT 69 PS (51 kW) (2007–2020)
  - 16V SMPI 80–86 PS (59–63 kW) (1998–2009)
- 1.4 L (1,368 cc) SMPI - 72 mm × 84 mm (2.8 in × 3.3 in) bore x stroke
  - 8V SMPI 77 PS (57 kW) (2003–current)
  - 8V SMPI VVT 77 PS (57 kW) (2005–current)
  - 8V SMPI Flex-fuel 90 PS (66 kW) (2005–current, Brazil only)
  - 16V SMPI 95 PS (70 kW) (2005–current)
  - 16V SMPI StarJet VVT – PDA 90–95 PS (66–70 kW) (2005–current)
  - 16V T-Jet 105–120–155–180–190 PS (77–88–114–132–140 kW) (2006–current)
  - 16V MultiAir 105 PS (77 kW) (2009–current)
  - 16V MultiAir Turbo 130–170 PS (96–125 kW) (2009–current)

All (non Abarth) fuel injected versions have a limiter off 6500 Rpm (fuel cutoff)

=== Alfa Romeo ===
- Alfa Romeo MiTo (2008) 1.4 L (1,368 cc) — 78–95–105–120–135–155–170 PS (57–70–77–88–99–114–125 kW)
- Alfa Romeo Giulietta (2010) 1.4 L (1,368 cc)

=== Autobianchi ===
- Autobianchi Y10 (1985) 1.0–1.1 L (999–1,108 cc) — 54 PS (40kW)

=== Dodge ===
- Dodge Dart (PF) (2013–2016) 1.4 L (1,368 cc)

=== Fiat ===
- Fiat Uno (1986) 1.0–1.1 L (999–1,108 cc)
- Fiat Panda (1986) 0.8–1.0–1.1 L (750–999–1,108 cc)
- Fiat Tipo (1988) 1.1 L (1,108 cc)
- Fiat Punto (1993) 1.1–1.2 L (1,108–1,242 cc)
- Fiat Cinquecento (1994) 1.1 L (1,108 cc) — 54 PS (40kW)
- Fiat Bravo/Brava (1995) 1.2 L (1,242 cc)
- Fiat Palio (1997) 1.2 L (1,242 cc)
- Fiat Seicento (1998) 1.1 L (1,108 cc) — 54 PS (40kW)
- Fiat Punto (1999) 1.2–1.4 L (1,242–1,368 cc) — 60–95 PS (44–70 kW)
- Fiat Stilo (2001) 1.2–1.4 L (1,242–1,368 cc)
- Fiat Panda (2003) 1.1–1.2–1.4 L (1,108–1,242–1,368 cc) — 54–60–69–77–100 PS (40–44–51–57–74 kW)
- Fiat Idea (2003) 1.2–1.4 L (1,242–1,368 cc) — 80–95 PS (59–70 kW)
- Fiat Grande Punto (2005)/Punto Evo (2009)/Punto (2012) 1.2–1.4 L (1,242–1,368 cc) — 65–69–77–95 PS (48–51–57–70 kW)
- Fiat Bravo (2007) 1.4 L (1,368 cc)
- Fiat 500 (2007) 1.2–1.4 L (1,242–1,368 cc) — 69–100 PS (51–74 kW)
- Fiat 500 Abarth (2008) 1.4 L (1,368 cc) 145–165–180–190 PS (107–121–132–140 kW)
- Fiat Linea (2009) 1.368 — 77 PS (57 kW)
- Fiat Panda (2011) 1.2 L (1,242 cc) — 69 PS (51 kW)
- Fiat 500L (2012) 1.4 L (1,368 cc)
- Fiat 500X (2015) 1.4 L (1,368 cc)
- Fiat Tipo (2015) 1.4 L (1,368 cc)
- Fiat 124 Spider (2017–2020) 1.4 L (1,368 cc) MultiAir

=== Ford ===
- Ford Ka (2008) 1.2 L (1,242 cc) — 69 PS (51 kW)

=== Jeep ===
- Jeep Renegade (2015–present) 1.4 L (1,368 cc)
- Jeep Compass (2018–present) 1.4 L (1,368 cc)

=== Lancia ===
- Lancia Y (1996) 1.1–1.2 L (1,108–1,242 cc)
- Lancia Ypsilon (2003) 1.2–1.4 L (1,242–1,368 cc) — 60–95 PS (44–70 kW)
- Lancia Musa (2004) 1.4 L (1,368 cc) — 95 PS (70 kW)
- Lancia Delta (2008) 1.4 L (1,368 cc)

=== Tata ===
- Tata Indica Vista (2008) 1.2 L (1,242 cc)
- Tata Indigo Manza (2009) 1.4 L (1,368 cc)

=== Tatuus ===
- Tatuus FA010 1.4 L (1,368 cc)

== Production ==
As part of the June 10, 2009 Operating Agreement, Chrysler's commercial production of Fully Integrated Robotized Engine began in its Dundee, Michigan facility. Chrysler's first FIRE engine model, a 100 hp (75 kW) 1.4-litre FIRE with Multiair valvetrain, was first introduced in Fiat 500 starting in 2010.

== See also ==
- MultiAir
- Fiat Global Small Engine
- JTD engine
- List of engines used in Chrysler products
