= Fiat Bravo (2007) =

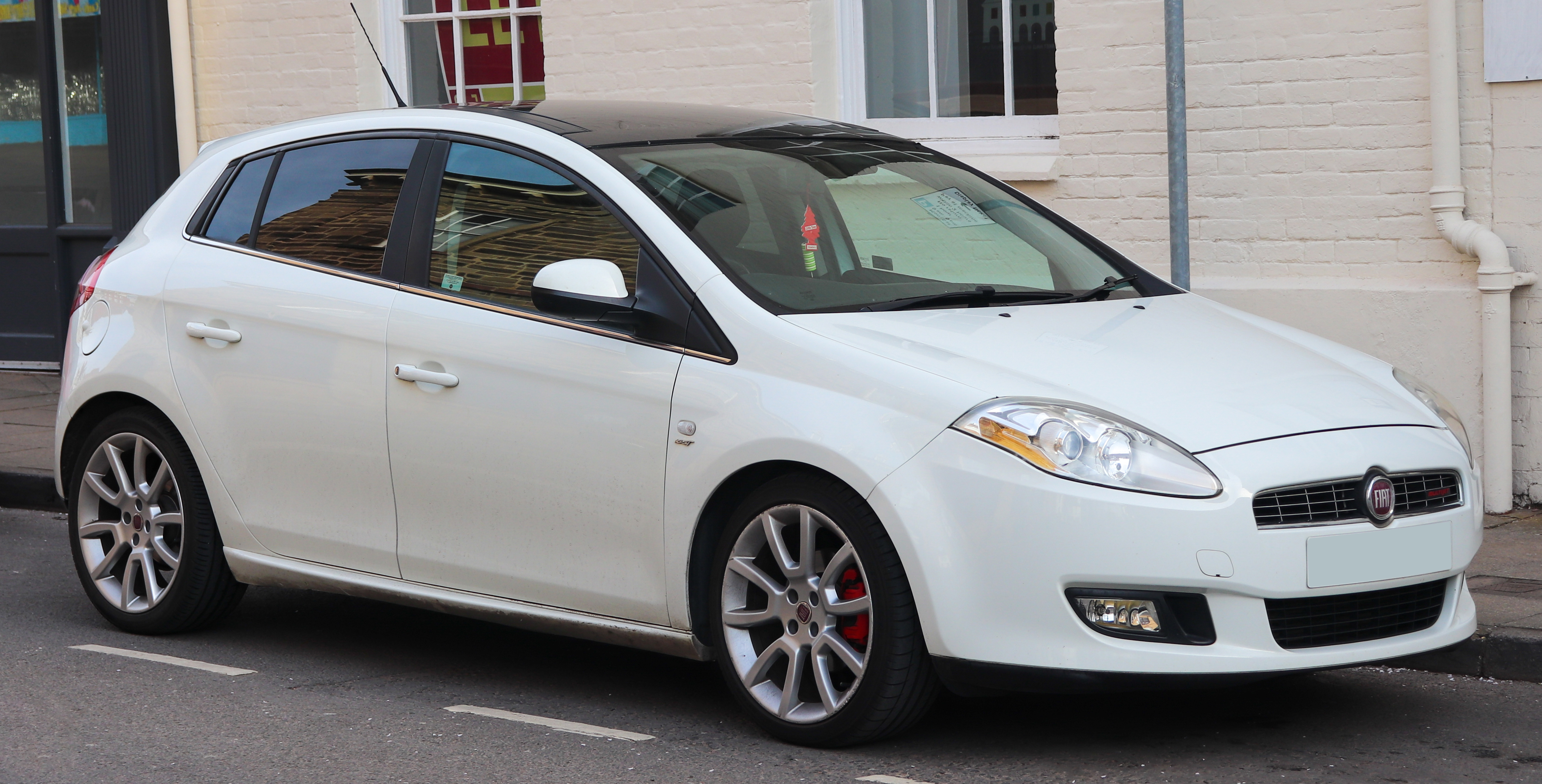
- Fiat Bravo Sport (pre-facelift)

Overview
- Manufacturer: Fiat Group Automobiles
- Also called: Fiat Ritmo (Australia)
- Production: April 2007 – July 2014 (Italy); October 2010 – June 2016 (Brazil)
- Assembly: Italy: Cassino, Frosinone; Brazil: Betim, Minas Gerais (Fiat Automóveis)
- Designer: Alberto Dilillo at Centro Stile Fiat

Body and chassis
- Class: Small family car (C)
- Body style: 5-door hatchback
- Layout: Front-engine, front-wheel-drive
- Platform: Fiat C2
- Related: Fiat Stilo; Lancia Delta (2008)

Powertrain
- Engine: petrol: 1.4 L Fire I4; 1.4 L TurboJet turbo I4; 1.8 L E.torQ I4; 1.4 L Fire I4 (petrol/LPG); diesel: 1.6 L Multijet turbo I4; 1.9 L Multijet I4; 2.0 L Multijet I4
- Transmission: 5/6-speed manual; 6-speed Dualogic

Dimensions
- Wheelbase: 2,600 mm (102.4 in)
- Length: 4,336 mm (170.7 in)
- Width: 1,792 mm (70.6 in)
- Height: 1,498 mm (59.0 in)
- Kerb weight: 1,205–1,360 kg (2,657–2,998 lb)

Chronology
- Predecessor: Fiat Stilo
- Successor: Fiat Ottimo (China); Fiat Tipo/Egea; Fiat Argo (Brazil)

The Fiat Bravo (Type 198) is a small family car produced by Italian manufacturer Fiat from 2007 to 2014. It was introduced to the press in January 2007 in Rome, and later to the public in March at the Geneva Motor Show. A minor facelift was available from 2010, with changes to the front grille, door handles and side mirrors, new colors, as well as interior improvements. The car was launched on 21 April 2007.

European production, at the Cassino plant, ended in July 2014, being part of FCA's 5 Year Plan, presented by Sergio Marchionne on 7 May 2014. It was replaced by the Fiat Tipo and the similarly sized Fiat 500X. The Bravo was the first car to bear Fiat Automobiles' then new logo, introduced in October 2006, containing a red background in a chrome frame.

== History ==
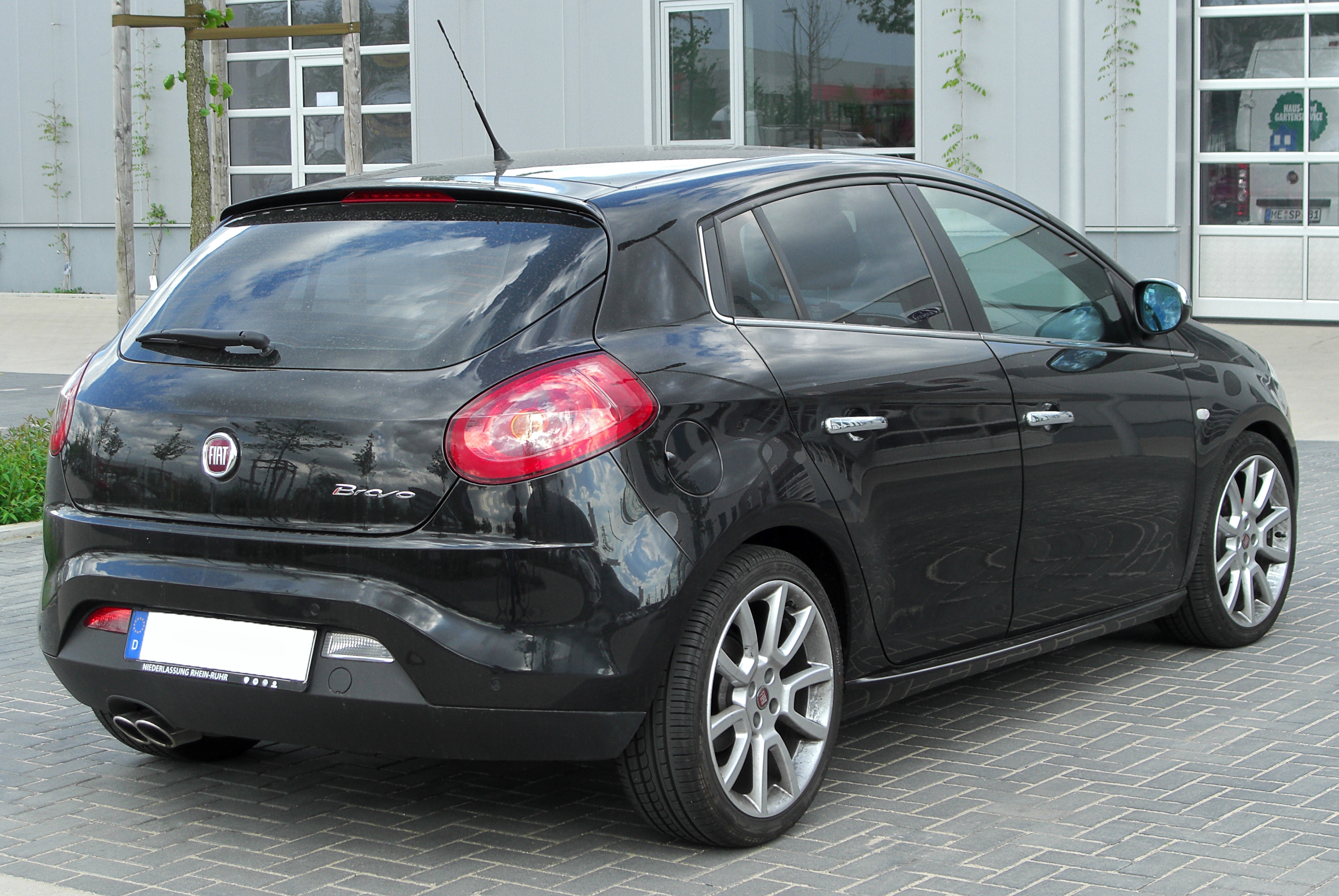
Fiat Bravo rear (pre-facelift)

The car was designed at Centro Stile Fiat, while Austrian automotive company Magna Steyr engineered a large amount of the car's body. CAD engineering and computer simulations were used on a very large scale with this model and the design was finished to a very tight schedule.

For markets in the EMEA, the Bravo was produced in Fiat's Piedimonte S. Germano plant.

Blue&Me is a new feature which was first introduced with the Fiat Grande Punto, and was fitted as standard on the Bravo Dynamic and Sport. Developed with Microsoft, this system offers Bluetooth hands free use with a mobile phone.

It is also capable of displaying SMS text on the dash screen, and it has built in voice activation. Another part of the system is the inclusion of a USB connector so that an MP3 player or USB flashcard can be plugged in, giving the car's entertainment system access to MP3 files stored on the unit.

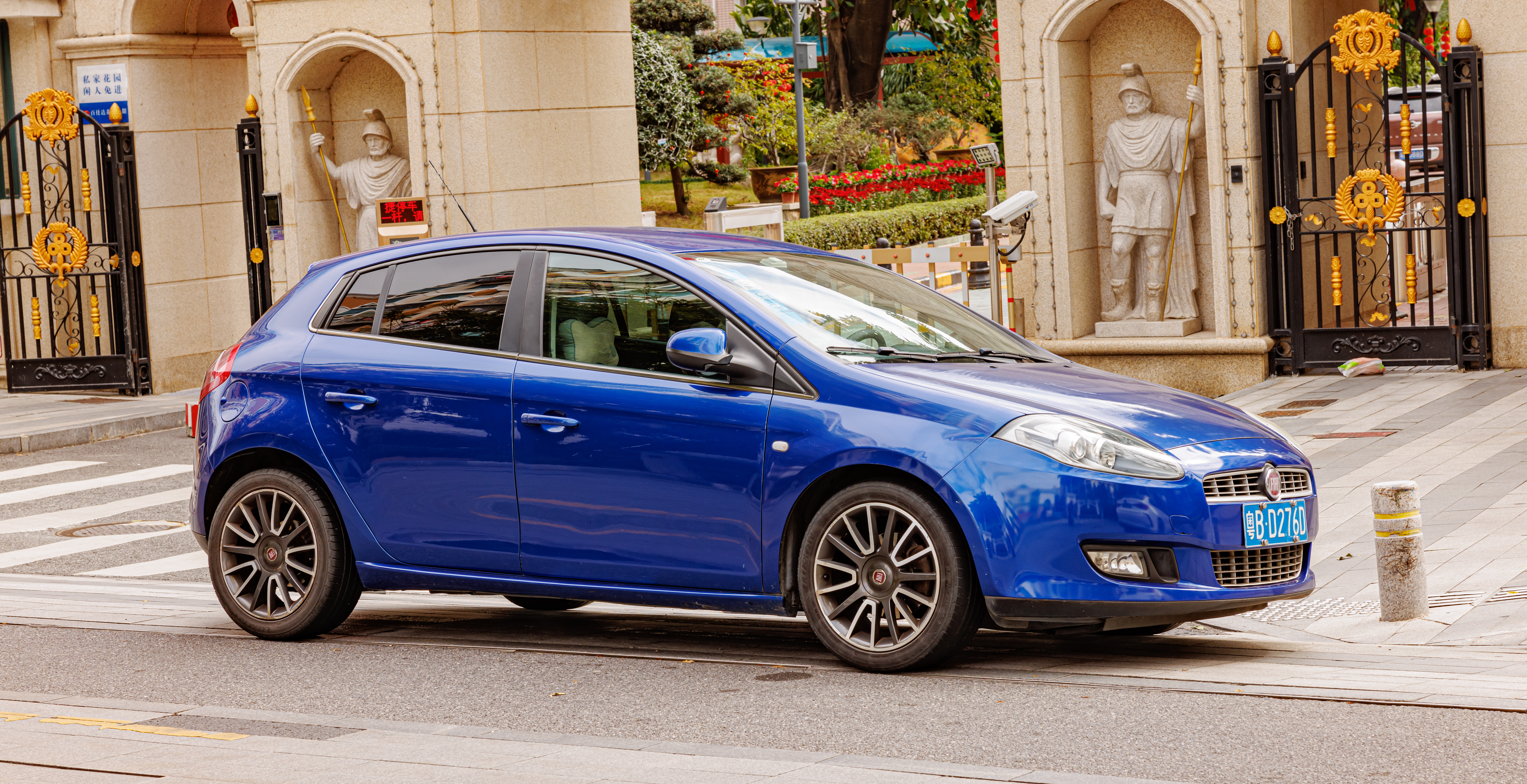
Fiat Bravo (facelift)

In Australia, the Fiat Bravo was sold as the Fiat Ritmo, since Mazda Australia owns rights to the "Bravo" name (as used on a commercial vehicle). It was introduced there in February 2008, however, it was discontinued the following year, due to slow sales, only 463 units were sold in total. The Bravo was also built in Brazil from 2010 to 2016, and was sold there and throughout South America (with the exception of Argentina, Chile and Colombia, who receive the Bravo from Italy).

In January 2007, What Car? reported that Fiat was working on a station wagon version, speculated to be marketed as the Bravo MultiWagon. Despite being a production ready version of the Bravo, it was never marketed. Other sources also claimed that this was actually a facelifted of the second generation Fiat Croma, launched in October 2007.

== Brazilian version ==
The Brazilian built Bravo went on sale in 2010 in Brazil. It was available with two engines options and three trim levels (five trim levels from 2012 onwards), the Brazilian-built 1.8L 16V E.torQ (based on the Tritec engine, delivering 132 PS (97 kW; 130 hp) at 5250 rpm with a torque of 185 N⋅m (18.9 kg⋅m; 136.4 lb⋅ft) at 4500 rpm) was fitted to either a five speed manual or a Dualogic automated transmission, while the Italian built turbocharged 1.4L engine, delivering 152 PS (112 kW; 150 hp), was fitted to a six speed manual transmission.

Trim levels were named as: Essence (1.8), Essence Wolverine Limited Edition (1.8), Sporting (1.8), Absolute (1.8) and T-Jet (1.4T).

Brazilian production ceased in June 2016.

== Engines ==
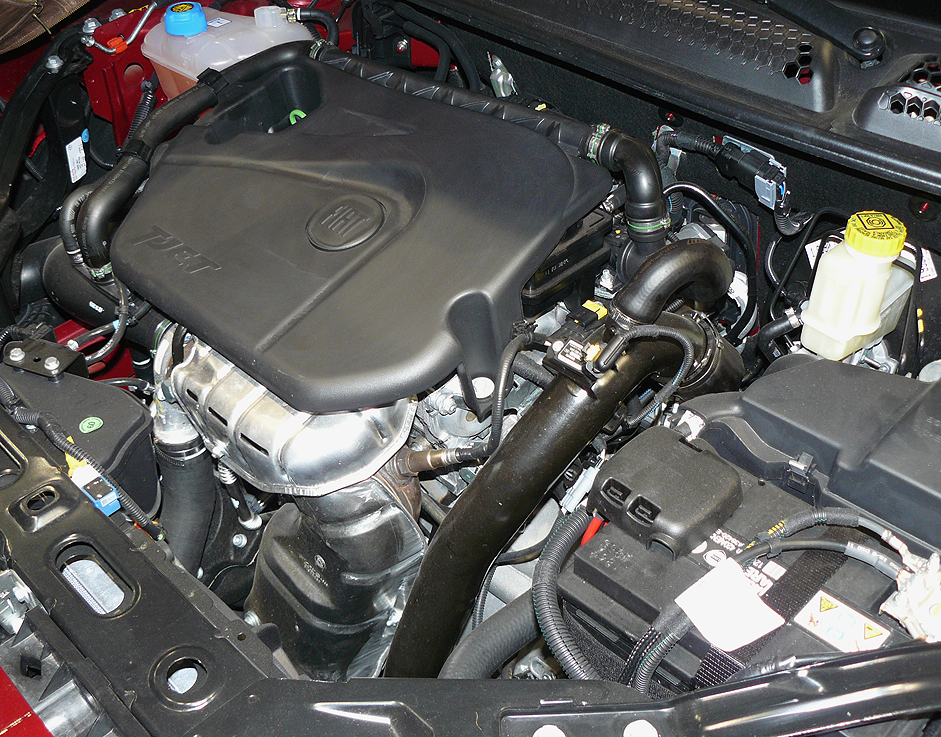
1.4 T-Jet engine

The Bravo was powered by three different petrol and three diesel engines. 'T-Jet' is the name of the new range of turbocharged petrol engines.

Some models of the 150 PS (110 kW; 148 hp) T-Jet version have a Sport button to give an "overboost" function. At the end of 2007, the new 1.6 L Multijet diesel engine was launched, and a more powerful 120 PS (88 kW; 118 hp) version in spring 2008.

The 105 PS (77 kW; 104 hp) version was available with the so called "Eco" pack which features changes to the car's aerodynamics and ECU, taller gear ratios and lower rolling resistance tyres. This gives better fuel consumption and lower CO_{2} emissions (119 g/km) when compared to the standard car. This engine is also Euro 5 rated.

A new 2.0 Multijet diesel was added to lineup at the end of 2008, that slowly replaced the 1.9 16v. In 2009, the Bravo got a new "eco" 90 PS (66 kW; 89 hp) variant of the Multijet diesel. In June 2010, two petrol engines were updated, the 1.4 T-Jet is fitted with the new Multiair technology, and the base 1.4 T-Jet was also updated to Euro 5 specification.

=== Petrol ===
| Model | Years | Engine | Displacement | Max power | max torque | CO_{2} emission (g/km) | 0–100 km/h (0–62 mph), s | Top speed | Notes |
|---|---|---|---|---|---|---|---|---|---|
| 1.4 Fire 16V 90 | 2007–2014 | straight-4, Petrol | 1,368 cc | 66 kW (90 PS; 89 hp) | 128 N⋅m (94 lb⋅ft) at 4,500 rpm | 156 | 12.5 | 179 km/h (111 mph) | |
| 1.4 Fire 16V 90 GPL | 2009–2014 | straight-4, Petrol-LPG | 1,368 cc | 66 kW (90 PS; 89 hp) | 128 N⋅m (94 lb⋅ft) at 4,500 rpm | 134 | 12.5 | 179 km/h (111 mph) | |
| 1.4 T-Jet 16V 120 | 2007–2014 | straight-4, Petrol | 1,368 cc | 88 kW (120 PS; 118 hp) | 206 N⋅m (152 lb⋅ft) at 2,000 rpm | 156 | 9.6 | 197 km/h (122 mph) | |
| 1.4 T-Jet 16V 120 Dualogic | 2008–2014 | straight-4, Petrol | 1,368 cc | 88 kW (120 PS; 118 hp) | 206 N⋅m (152 lb⋅ft) at 2,000 rpm | 154 | 9.6 | 197 km/h (122 mph) | |
| 1.4 Multiair Turbo 16V 140 | 2010–2014 | straight-4, Petrol | 1,368 cc | 103 kW (140 PS; 138 hp) | 230 N⋅m (170 lb⋅ft) at 1,750 rpm | 132 | 8.5 (8.2 Sport) | 204 km/h (127 mph) | |
| 1.4 T-Jet 16V 150 | 2007–2010 | straight-4, Petrol | 1,368 cc | 110 kW (150 PS; 148 hp) | 230 N⋅m (170 lb⋅ft) at 3,000 rpm | 165 | 8.5 (8.2 Sport) | 212 km/h (132 mph) | |
| 1.7 E.Torq 1.8 16V | 2010–2014 | straight-4, Petrol/Ethanol | 1,747 cc | 95 kW (129 PS; 127 hp) (petrol); 97 kW (132 PS; 130 hp) (ethanol) | 180 N⋅m (133 lb⋅ft) at 4,500 rpm (petrol); 185 N⋅m (136 lb⋅ft) at 4,500 rpm (ethanol) | n/a | 10.3 (petrol); 9.9 (ethanol) | 191 km/h (119 mph) (petrol); 193 km/h (120 mph) (ethanol) | Brazilian market version |

=== Diesel ===
| Model | Years | Engine | Displacement | Max power | Max torque | CO_{2} emission (g/km) | 0–100 km/h (0–62 mph), s | Top speed | Notes |
|---|---|---|---|---|---|---|---|---|---|
| 1.6 Multijet 16V 90 | 2009–2014 | straight-4, Diesel | 1,598 cc | 66 kW (90 PS; 89 hp) | 290 N⋅m (214 lb⋅ft) at 1,500 rpm | 120 | 13.1 | 173 km/h (107 mph) | |
| 1.6 Multijet 16V 105 | 2008–2014 | straight-4, Diesel | 1,598 cc | 77 kW (105 PS; 103 hp) | 290 N⋅m (214 lb⋅ft) at 1,500 rpm | 129 | 11.3 | 187 km/h (116 mph) | |
| 1.6 Multijet 16V PurO_{2} 105 | 2009–2014 | straight-4, Diesel | 1,598 cc | 77 kW (105 PS; 103 hp) | 290 N⋅m (214 lb⋅ft) at 1,500 rpm | 119 | 11.3 | 187 km/h (116 mph) | |
| 1.6 Multijet 16V 120 | 2008–2014 | straight-4, Diesel | 1,598 cc | 88 kW (120 PS; 118 hp) | 300 N⋅m (221 lb⋅ft) at 1,500 rpm | 129 | 10.5 | 195 km/h (121 mph) | |
| 1.6 Multijet 16V 120 Dualogic | 2008–2014 | straight-4, Diesel | 1,598 cc | 88 kW (120 PS; 118 hp) | 300 N⋅m (221 lb⋅ft) at 1,500 rpm | 120 | 10.5 | 195 km/h (121 mph) | |
| 1.9 Multijet 8V 90 | – | straight-4, Diesel | 1,910 cc | 66 kW (90 PS; 89 hp) | 225 N⋅m (166 lb⋅ft) at 2,000 rpm | 139 | 12.5 | 174 km/h (108 mph) | |
| 1.9 Multijet 8V 120 | 2007–2008 | straight-4, Diesel | 1,910 cc | 88 kW (120 PS; 118 hp) | 255 N⋅m (188 lb⋅ft) at 2,000 rpm | 139 | 10.5 | 194 km/h (121 mph) | |
| 1.9 Multijet 16V 150 | 2007–2008 | straight-4, Diesel | 1,910 cc | 110 kW (150 PS; 148 hp) | 305 N⋅m (225 lb⋅ft) at 2,000 rpm | 149 | 9.0 | 209 km/h (130 mph) | |
| 2.0 Multijet 16V 165 | 2008–2012 | straight-4, Diesel | 1,956 cc | 121 kW (165 PS; 162 hp) | 360 N⋅m (266 lb⋅ft) at 2,000 rpm | 139 | 8.2 | 215 km/h (134 mph) | |

== Safety ==
The Fiat Bravo passed the Euro NCAP car safety tests, with following ratings:

Euro NCAP test results* Fiat Bravo (2007)
| Test | Score | Rating |
|---|---|---|
| Adult occupant: | 33 | 5 /5 stars |
| Child occupant: | 36 | 3 /5 stars |
| Pedestrian: | 16 | 2 /4 stars |

ANCAP test results* Fiat Bravo / Ritmo (2008)
| Test | Score |
|---|---|
| Overall | 5 /5 stars |
| Frontal offset | 12.77/16 |
| Side impact | 15.73/16 |
| Pole | 2/2 |
| Seat belt reminders | 2/3 |
| Whiplash protection | Not Assessed |
| Pedestrian protection | Marginal |
| Electronic stability control | Not Assessed |

== Sales ==
| Year | Brazil |
|---|---|
| 2010 | 318 |
| 2011 | 11,828 |
| 2012 | 10,438 |
| 2013 | 9,065 |
| 2014 | 4,437 |
| 2015 | 2,786 |
| 2016 | 1,969 |
| 2017 | 60 |
