= Fiat Idea =

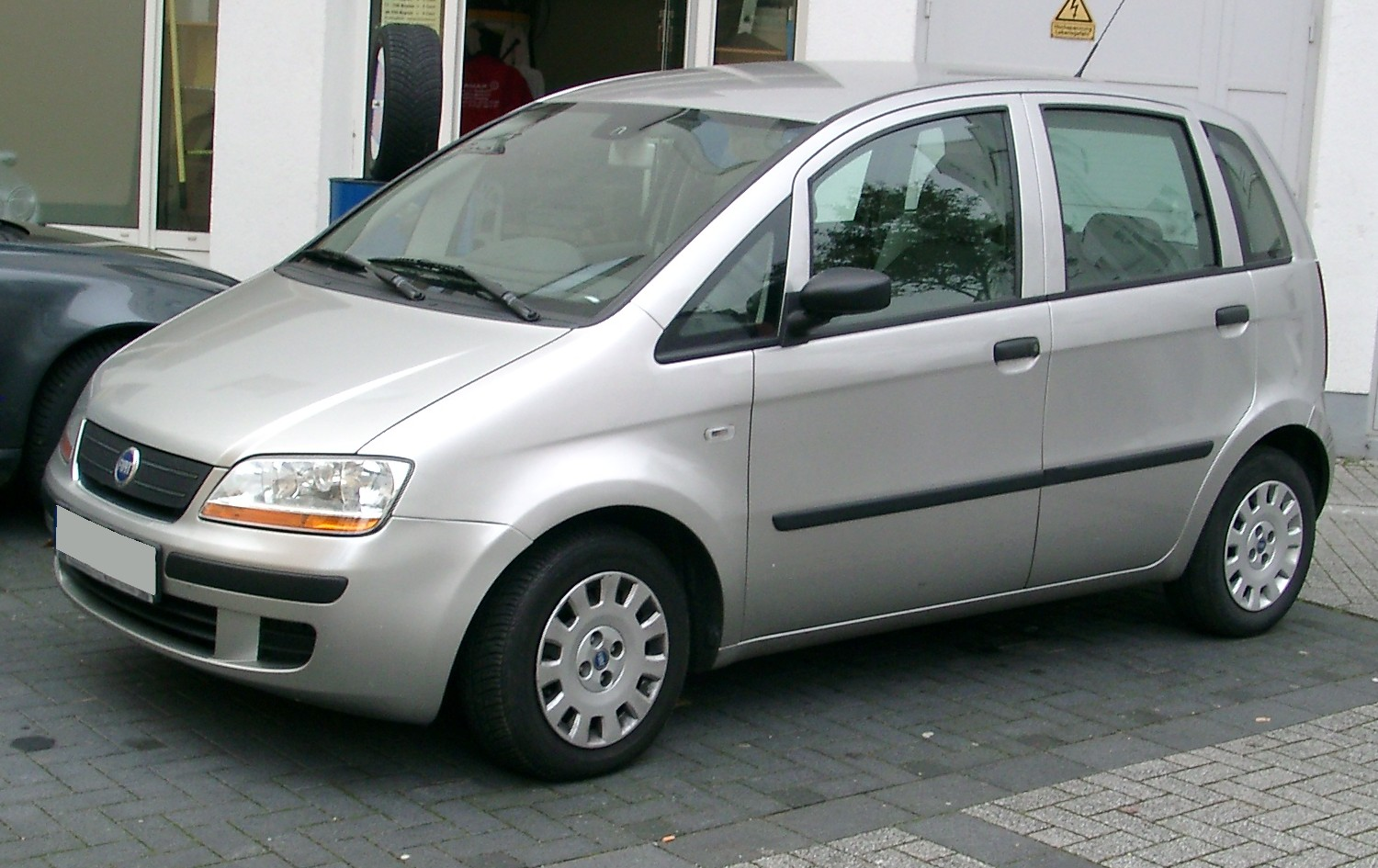

Overview
- Manufacturer: Fiat
- Production: 2003–2012 (Italy); 2005–2016 (Brazil); 2005–2018 (Argentina)
- Assembly: Italy: Turin (Mirafiori); Brazil: Betim (Fiat Automóveis)
- Designer: Fabrizio Giugiaro at Italdesign

Body and chassis
- Class: Mini MPV (M)
- Body style: 5-door MPV
- Layout: Front-engine, front-wheel-drive
- Platform: Fiat B
- Related: Fiat Punto (188); Lancia Musa

Powertrain
- Engine: Petrol engines: 1.2 L FIRE I4; 1.4 L FIRE I4; 1.6 L E.torQ I4 (Brazil only); 1.8 L X18XE I4 (Brazil only); 1.8 L E.torQ I4 (Brazil only); Diesel engines: 1.3 L Multijet I4; 1.6 L Multijet I4; 1.9 L Multijet I4
- Transmission: 5-speed manual 6-speed manual 5-speed Dualogic automated manual

Dimensions
- Wheelbase: 2,510 mm (98.8 in)
- Length: 3,930 mm (154.7 in)
- Width: 1,700 mm (66.9 in)
- Height: 1,660 mm (65.4 in)
- Curb weight: 1,275 kg (2,811 lb)

Chronology
- Predecessor: Fiat Palio Weekend (Europe)
- Successor: Fiat 500L

The Fiat Idea is a car manufactured and marketed by Fiat from 2003 to 2012 over a single generation with one intermediate facelift. It is a five-passenger mini MPV with five doors. It has a front-engine, front-wheel drive layout.

Internally designated the Type 350, the Idea was Fiat's first entry in the compact MPV market, sharing its platform with the third-generation Fiat Punto (Project 199); exterior design by Fabrizio Giugiaro at Italdesign and interior design by Fiat's Centro Stilo. The monovolume design is noted for its centrally located instrument cluster, and high H-point, reconfigurable seating — with reclining, sliding and folding rear seating.

The Idea debuted at the 2003 Geneva International Motor Show, followed a year later by an upscale variant, the Lancia Musa, sharing many common components with modified exterior. Both were manufactured at Fiat's Mirafiori plant and were superseded by the Fiat 500L. Production continued through MY 2016 in Brazil, including the Adventure model, a front-drive variant with increased ground clearance, and styling elements resembling an off-road vehicle.

The Idea nameplate is an acronym for Intelligent Design Emotive Architecture.

== Design ==
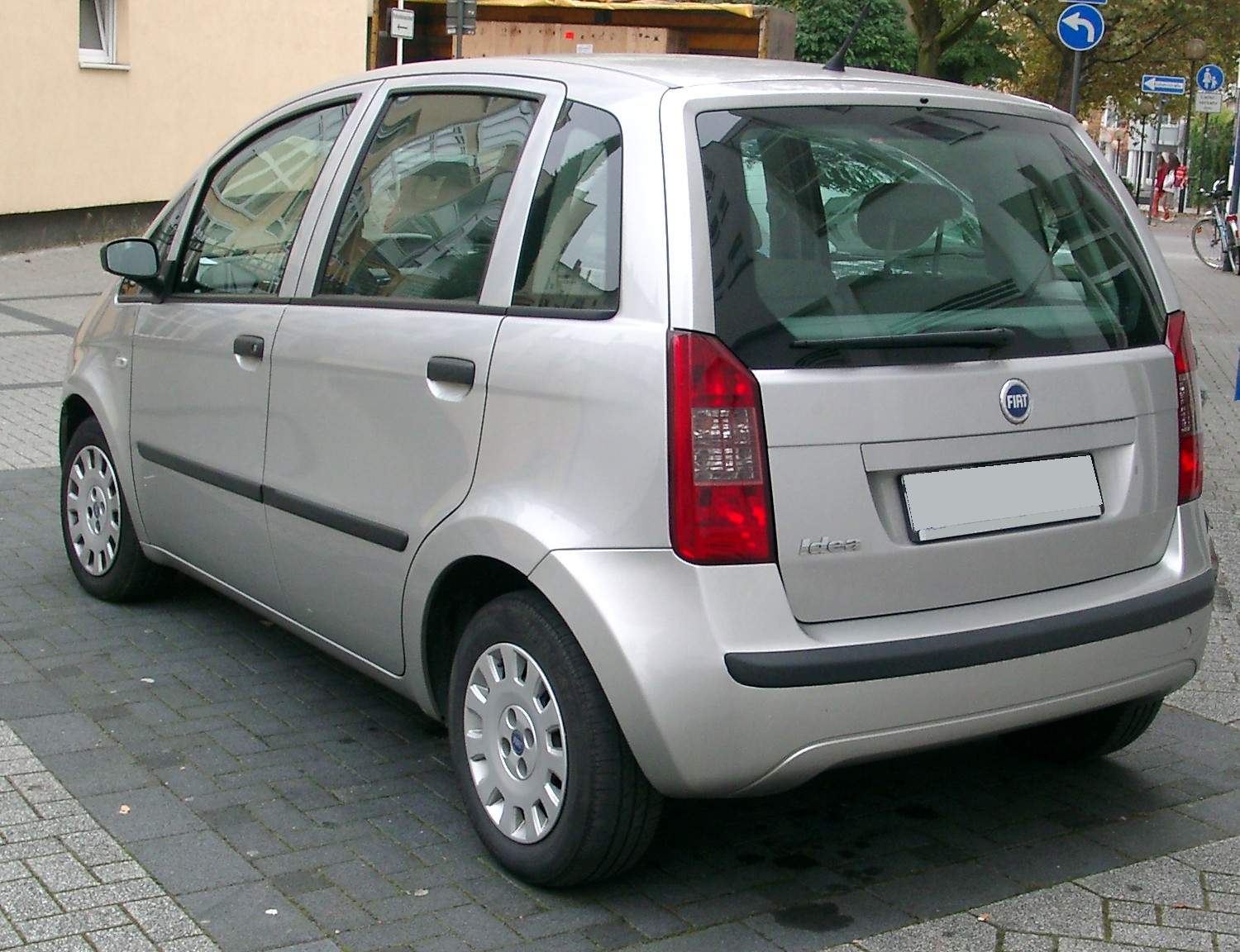
Rear

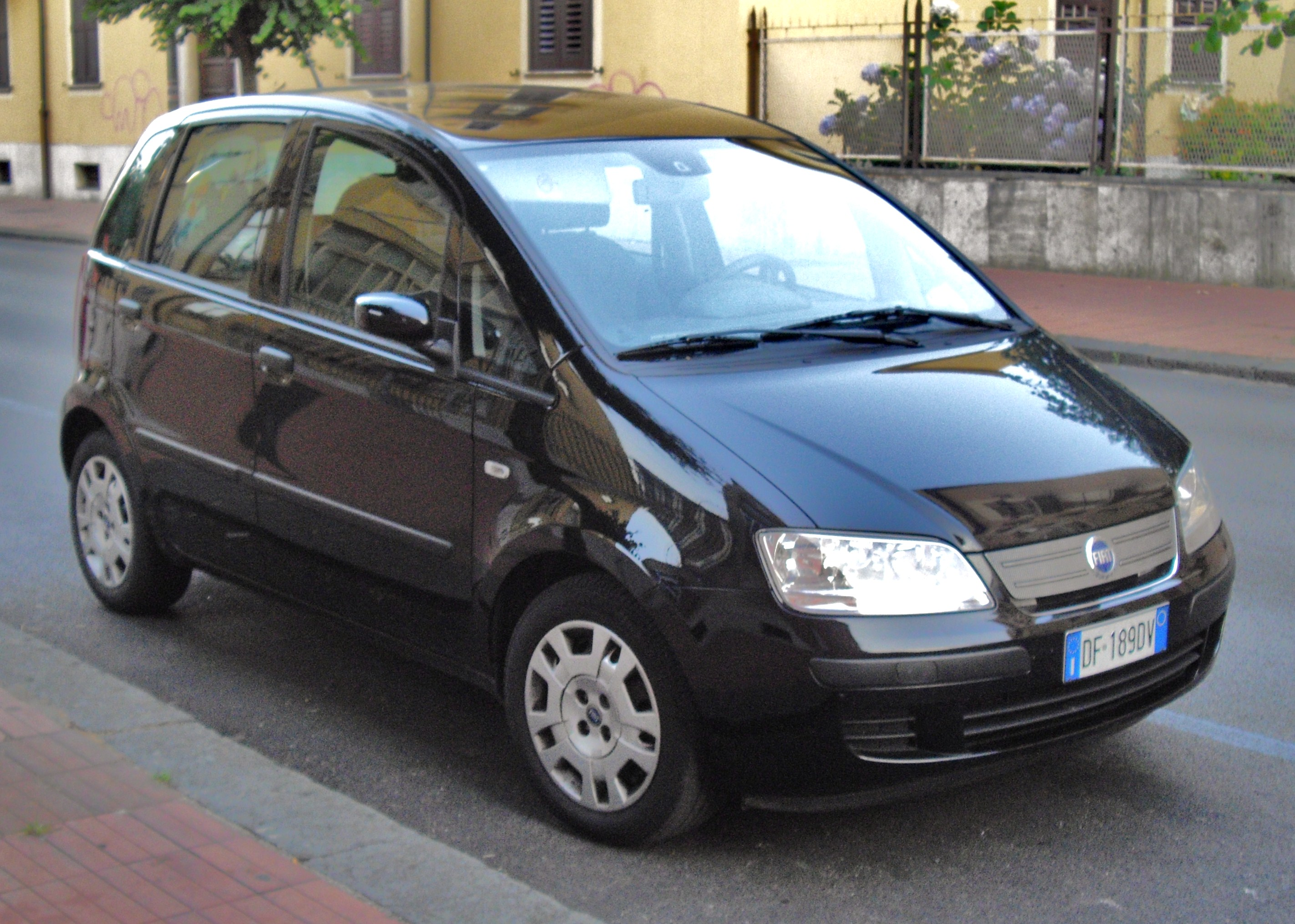
Front

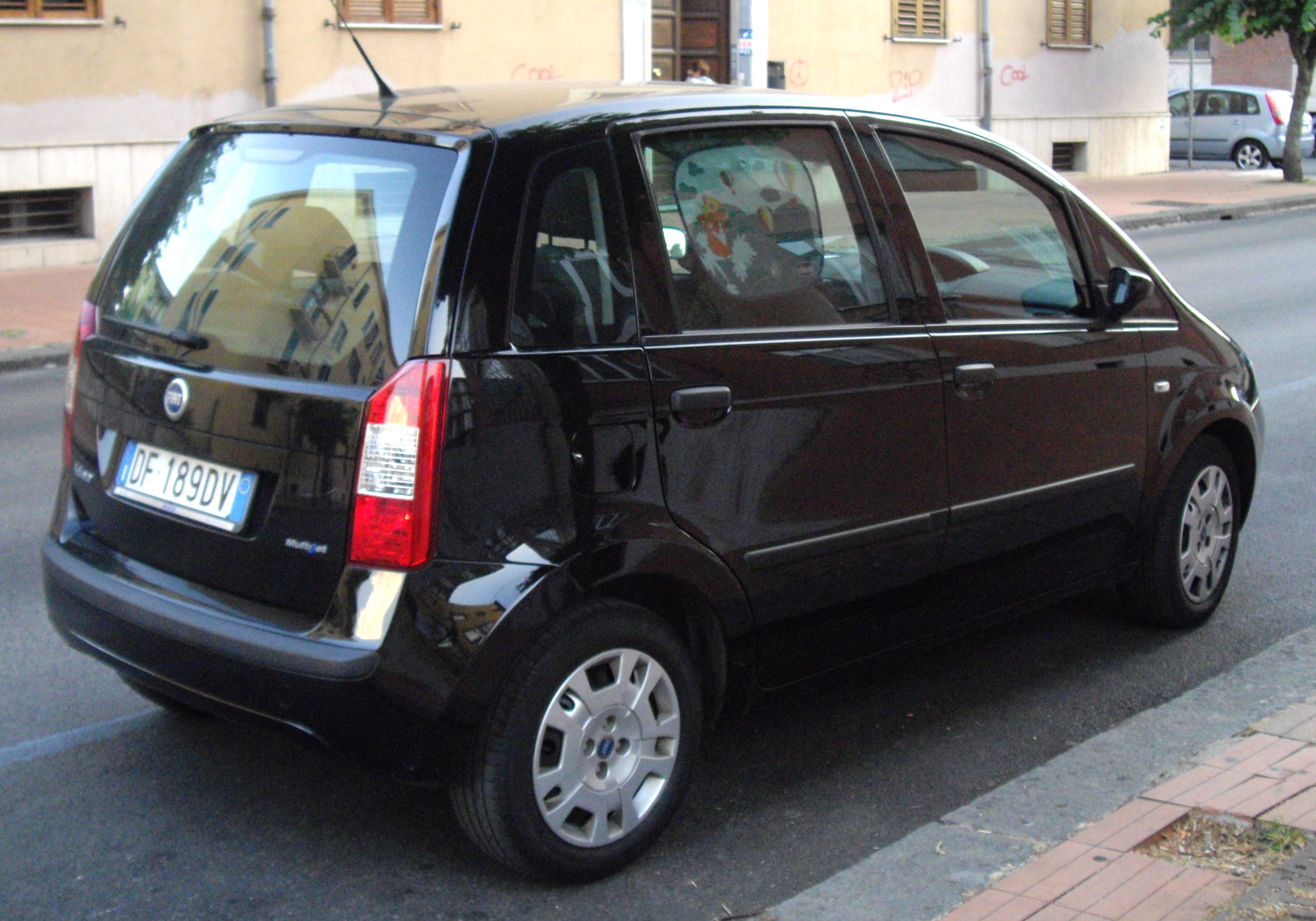
Rear

The Idea was conceived as a compact, mono volume MPV — i.e., to integrate the handling and compact size of a B-segment car under four meters in length with the increased height, flexible seating, cargo configurability and versatility of an MPV.

The Idea's rear seats combine 40:20:40 split/folding and 60-degree-reclining backrests with a 60:40 split, folding and sliding seat base — the rear seats slide forward or rearward to prioritize cargo or passenger space, recline for comfort lounging, as well as fold and tumble for maximum cargo. The front passenger seat folds flat to receive tall items and 25 storage compartments are distributed throughout the cabin. The Idea's seating was designed using biometric principles developed by Antonio Dal Monte at the Italian National Olympic Committee's sport medicine institute.

Standard features included six airbags, Isofix attachments, automatic door locks, fire prevention system (fuel pump inertia cut off switch and in-tank fuel cut off; plastic fuel tank resistant to mechanical stress and fire; maxifuse-equipped electrical power leads to cut off power supply at high temperature; protectively located starter motor and alternator connections with abrasion‐proof coatings; and fire-resistant interior trim), ABS braking with brake force distribution, and anti-slip regulation system to limit wheel slip in cases of reduced grip, traction control, electronic stability control, hill-holder, electric speed-sensitive power steering system, 0-20-40 split rear seating, and a headlight delay system marketed as Follow Me Home.

Optional features included a panoramic sunroof, parking sensors, and dual-zone climate control.

== Engines ==
The Fiat Idea engines are all Euro 4 compliant. The petrol engine is the 1.4-litre 16 valve 95 PS (70 kW; 94 hp), available with five- and six-speed gearboxes, and the diesel 1.3-litre 16 valve MultiJet units, with 70 PS (51 kW; 69 hp) or 90 PS (66 kW; 89 hp). All of these engines can be matched with a clutchless 5-speed sequential manual shift with a selectable, fully automatic mode — as an automated manual gearbox marketed as Dualogic.

Model	Engine	Displacement	Power	Torque
1.2 Fire 16V	I4	1242 cc	80 PS (59 kW; 79 hp) at 5,000 rpm	114 N⋅m (84 lb⋅ft) at 4,000 rpm
1.4 8V	I4	1368 cc	77 PS (57 kW; 76 hp) at 6,000 rpm	115 N⋅m (85 lb⋅ft) at 3,000 rpm
1.4 FIRE 16V	I4	1368 cc	95 PS (70 kW; 94 hp) at 5,800 rpm	128 N⋅m (94 lb⋅ft) at 4,500 rpm
1.3 16V Multijet	I4	1248 cc	70 PS (51 kW; 69 hp) at 4,000 rpm	180 N⋅m (133 lb⋅ft) at 1,750 rpm
1.3 16V Multijet	I4	1248 cc	90 PS (66 kW; 89 hp) at 4,000 rpm	200 N⋅m (148 lb⋅ft) at 1,750 rpm
1.6 16V Multijet	I4	1598 cc	120 PS (88 kW; 118 hp) at 4,000 rpm	300 N⋅m (221 lb⋅ft) at 1,500 rpm
1.9 8V Multijet	I4	1910 cc	100 PS (74 kW; 99 hp) at 4,000 rpm	260 N⋅m (192 lb⋅ft) at 1,750 rpm

== Brazil ==
The Brazilian version of the Idea was launched in late 2005. The engines available are the new 1.4-litre 8-valve 86 hp (64 kW) Fire engine (the same as in the Grande Punto) and the latest version of the GM-sourced Powertrain 1.8-litre 8-valve 114 hp (85 kW) engine. Both have flexible fuel technology, which lets the driver use either gasoline or ethanol.

This version has increased height compared to the European version. The dashboard derives from the Fiat Palio Mk. III, and adapted to the Fiat Idea. Options include a panoramic glass roof as an option, marketed as the SkyDome.

The Idea is exported in two different trim levels (the ELX with the 1.4-liter engine and the HLX with the 1.8 engine) and it has four airbags, anti-lock braking system with EBD; parking, rain and lights sensor, security laminated glass, the SkyDome, 15" alloys, Bluetooth phone system, and leather seats among other features.

In 2010, the Idea received a major facelift with a new front, rear, and door handle.

Over 265,000 Ideas have been sold in Brazil.

=== Idea Adventure ===
The Idea Adventure is a mini crossover version launched in September 2006 in São Paulo, Brazil. Chiefly featuring cosmetic revisions to the Idea, the Adventure has a revised suspension, tires are Pirelli Scorpion 205/70 R15, a body moldings, 15" alloys, interior mods like the white instruments, and standard safety equipment which features double front and side airbags, ABS brakes with EBD. In 2009, the entire Adventure line (Idea, Doblò, Strada and Palio Weekend) was equipped with a locking differential. The line was rebadged as Adventure Locker.

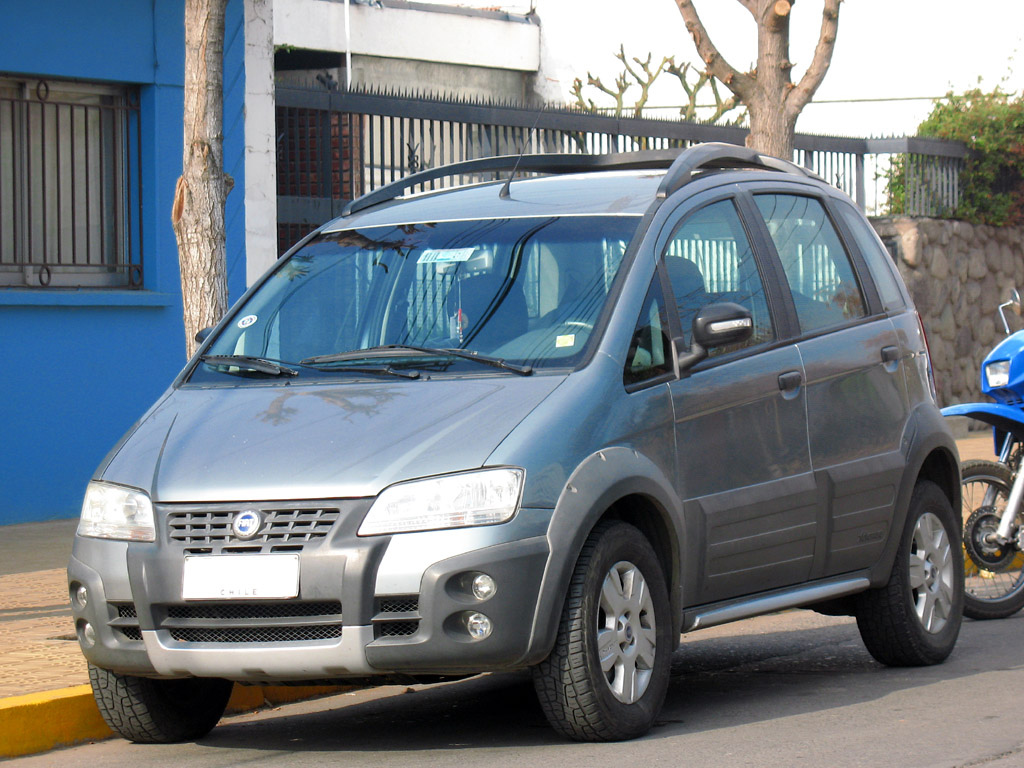
Fiat Idea Adventure

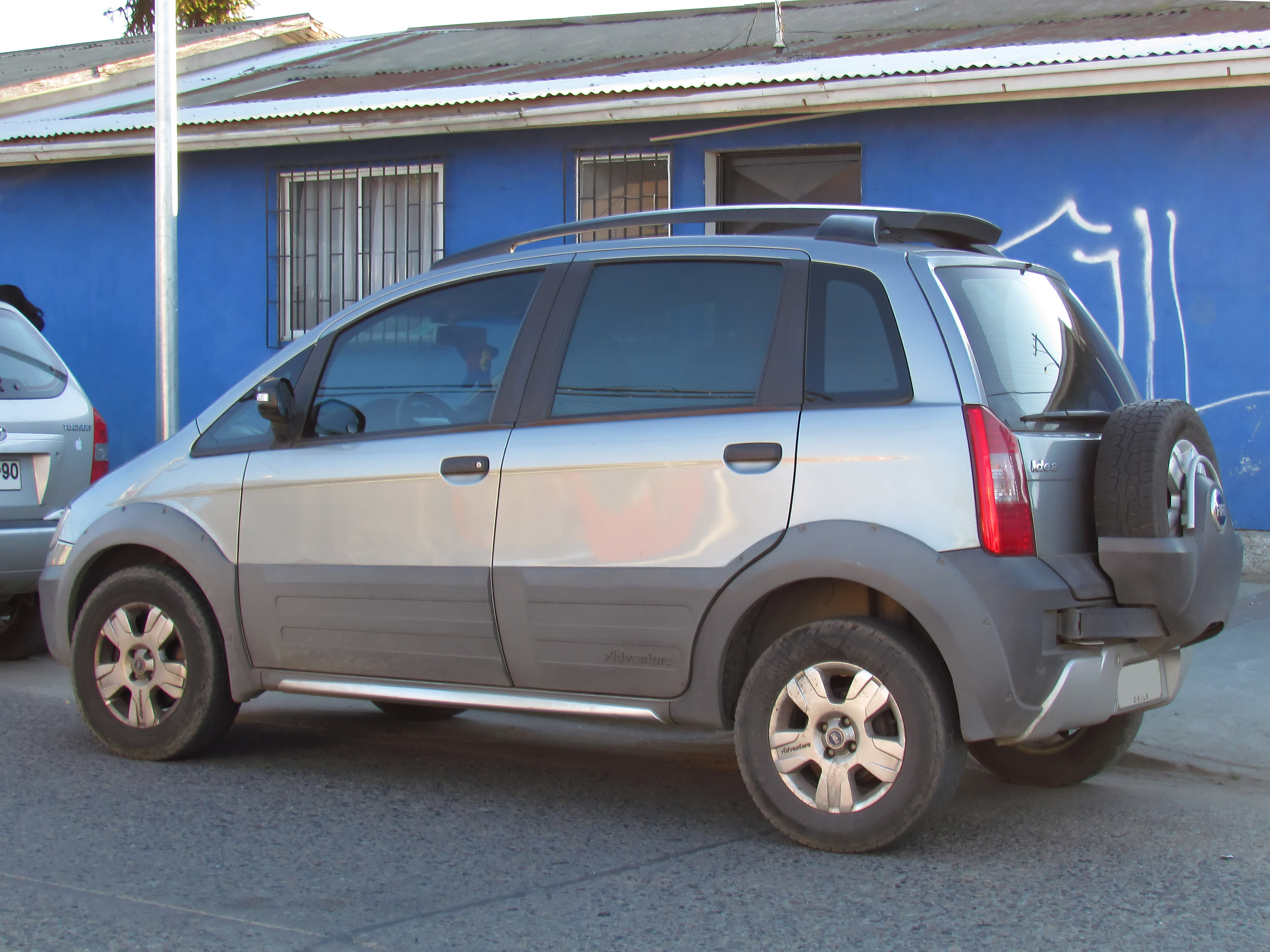
Fiat Idea Adventure

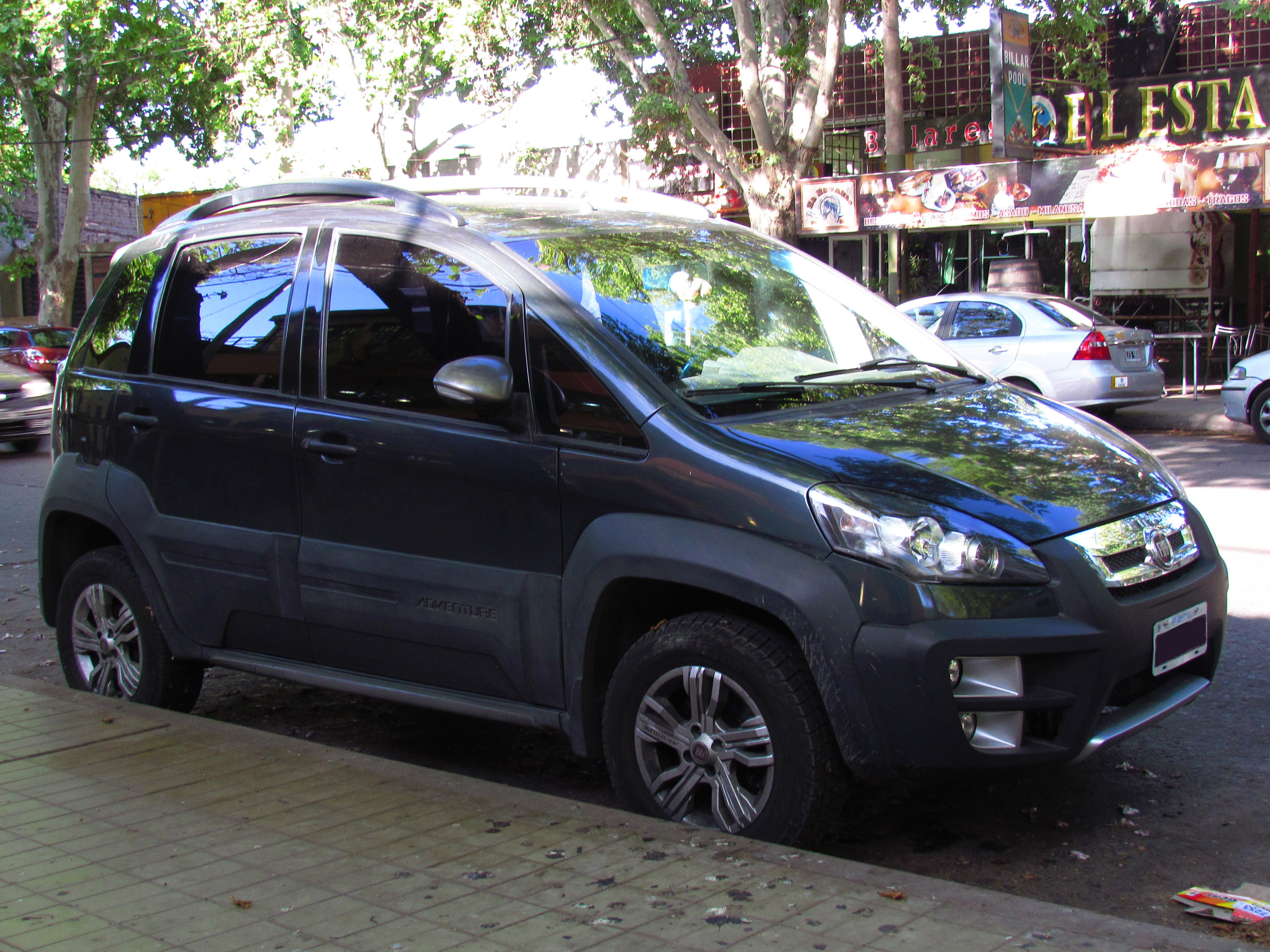
Fiat Idea Adventure facelift

== Sales ==
Year	Brazil
2005	8,967
2006	26,696
2007	30,350
2008	27,011
2009	27,652
2010	25,820
2011	26,056
2012	26,245
2013	23,451
2014	16,776
2015	8,199
2016	3,054
2017	62
