= Lancia Musa =

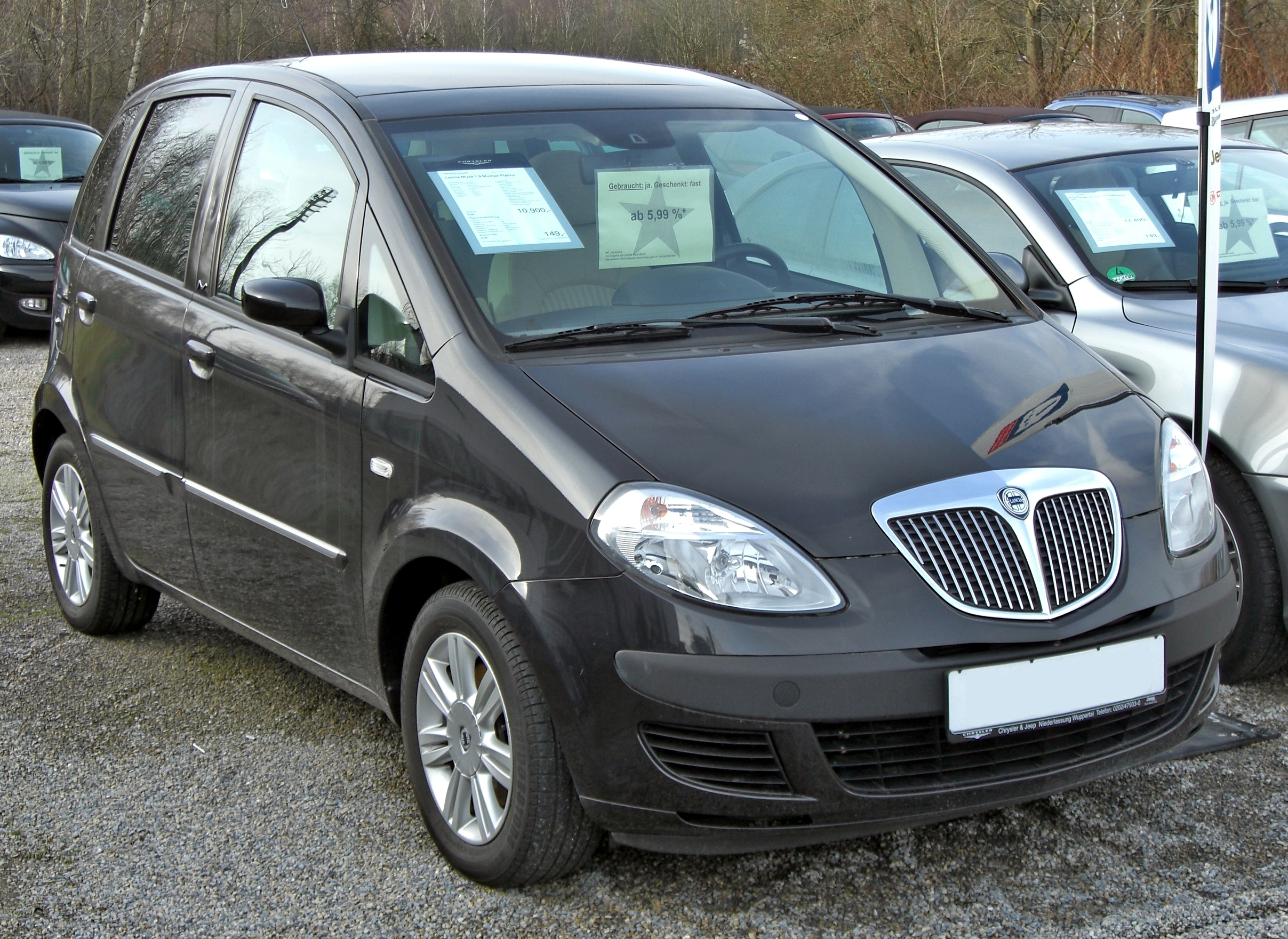

Overview
- Manufacturer: Lancia (Fiat)
- Production: 2004–2012
- Assembly: Italy: Turin (Mirafiori)
- Designer: Flavio Manzoni (adaption from Fiat Idea)

Body and chassis
- Class: Compact MPV (B)
- Body style: 5-door MPV
- Layout: FF layout
- Platform: Fiat B
- Related: Fiat Idea; Fiat Punto (188); Lancia Ypsilon (843)

Powertrain
- Engine: 1.4 8v FIRE (LPG); 1.4 16v FIRE; 1.3 16v Multijet Diesel; 1.6 16v Multijet Diesel; 1.9 8v Multijet Diesel
- Transmission: 5-speed manual 6-speed manual 5-speed D.F.N. automated manual

Dimensions
- Wheelbase: 2,508 mm (98.7 in)
- Length: 3,990 mm (157.1 in); 4,037 mm (158.9 in) (facelift 2007)
- Width: 1,700 mm (66.9 in)
- Height: 1,660–1,684 mm (65.4–66.3 in)
- Curb weight: 1,155–1,275 kg (2,546.3–2,810.9 lb)

Chronology
- Successor: Fiat 500L

The Lancia Musa (Type 350) is a five-passenger compact MPV manufactured by Fiat, and marketed by the company's Lancia subdivision from 2004 to 2012 over a single generation. A front-engine, front-wheel-drive, five-door design and a modified variant of the Fiat Idea, the Musa also employs the Project 188 platform, originally used for the second generation Fiat Punto. Total Musa production was about 237,500.

== Background ==
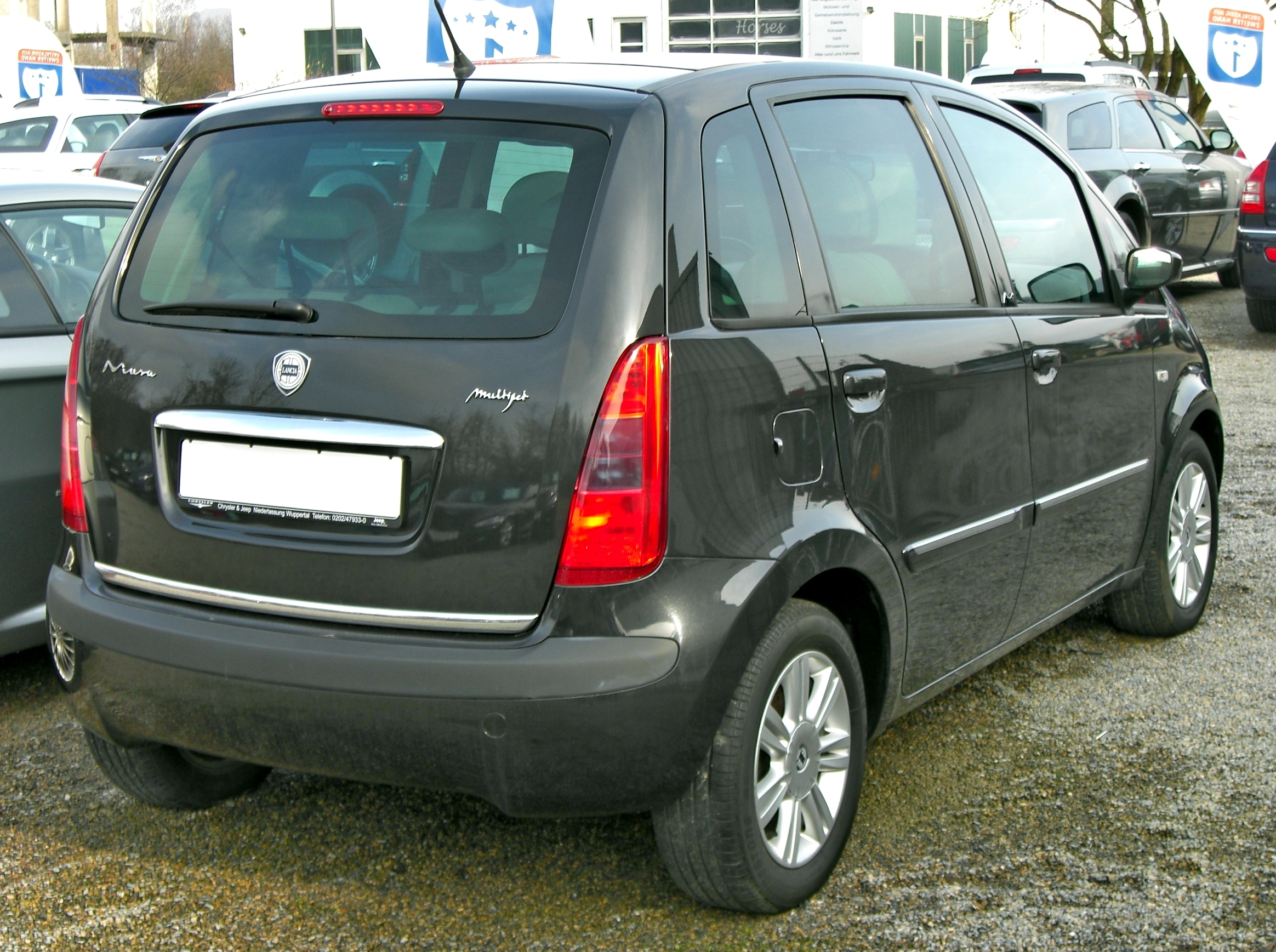
Lancia Musa (2004–2007)

The Musa design, an adaption of the Fiat Idea by Fabrizio Giugiaro, was initially supervised by Flavio Manzoni and subsequently Marco Tencone. It debuted at the 2004 Geneva Motor Show and deliveries began in Europe in October of the same year. The Musa's front and rear-end styling bears resemblance to the technically related Lancia Ypsilon, with which it shares headlights. As a compact MPV (multi-purpose vehicle), the Musa is considered to form part of the B-segment of the European car market.

The interior features Alcantara or leather, as well as chrome details. Like the Fiat Idea, the Musa offers an automated manual transmission marketed as Dolce Far Niente (D.F.N.) — for all engines except the eight valve version of the 1.4 FIRE.

== Facelift ==
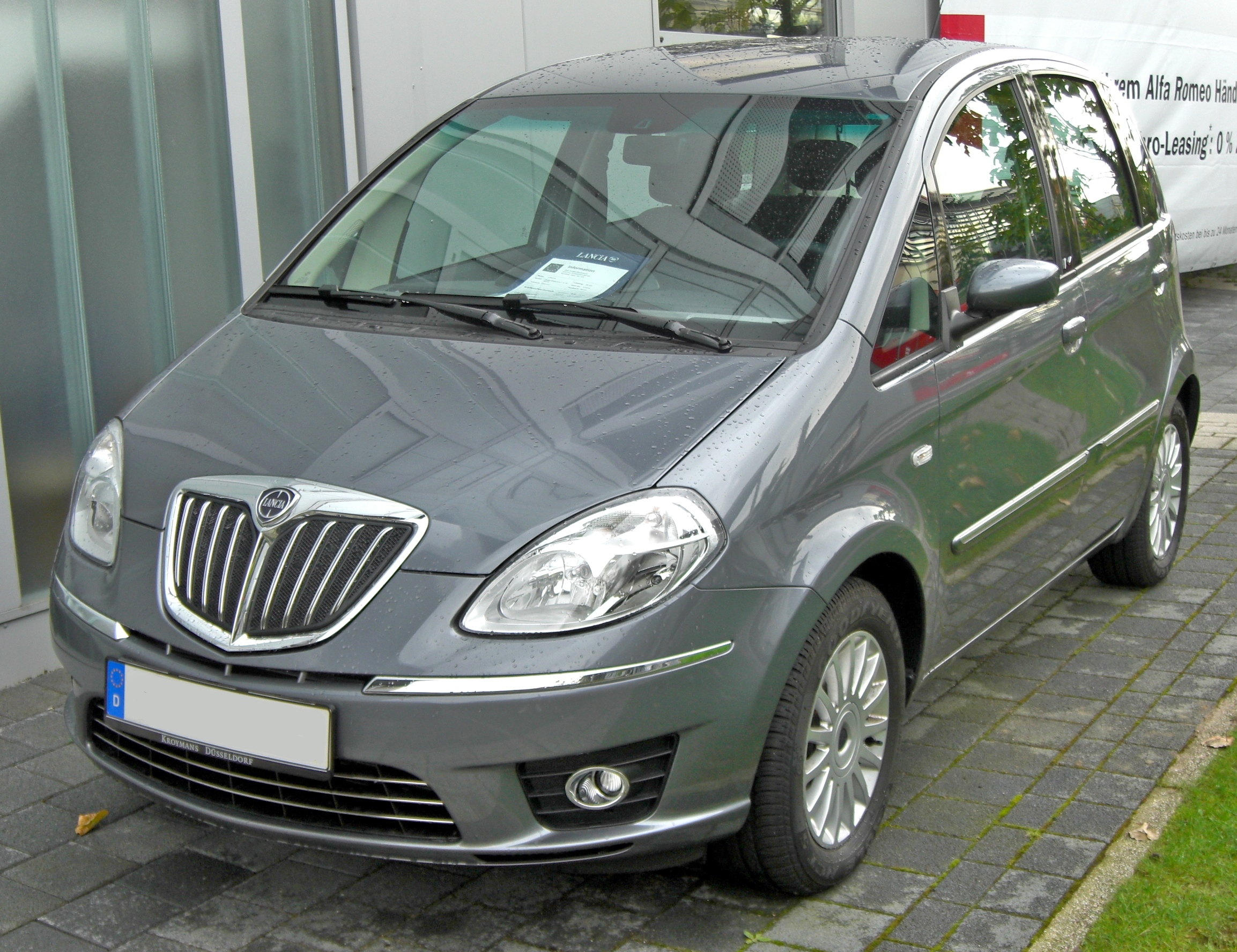
Lancia Musa (2008–2012)

A revised, mildly facelifted Musa premiered at the 2007 Venice Film Festival, and debuted at Frankfurt Auto Show in October 2007, with a revised logo of Lancia, front bumper fascia with new chrome moldings, bodyside moldings with chrome inserts, LED rear lamps and a luggage compartment seventy litres larger, while and loading deck lowered by 4 cm, as well as revised headliner soundproofing in the headliner.

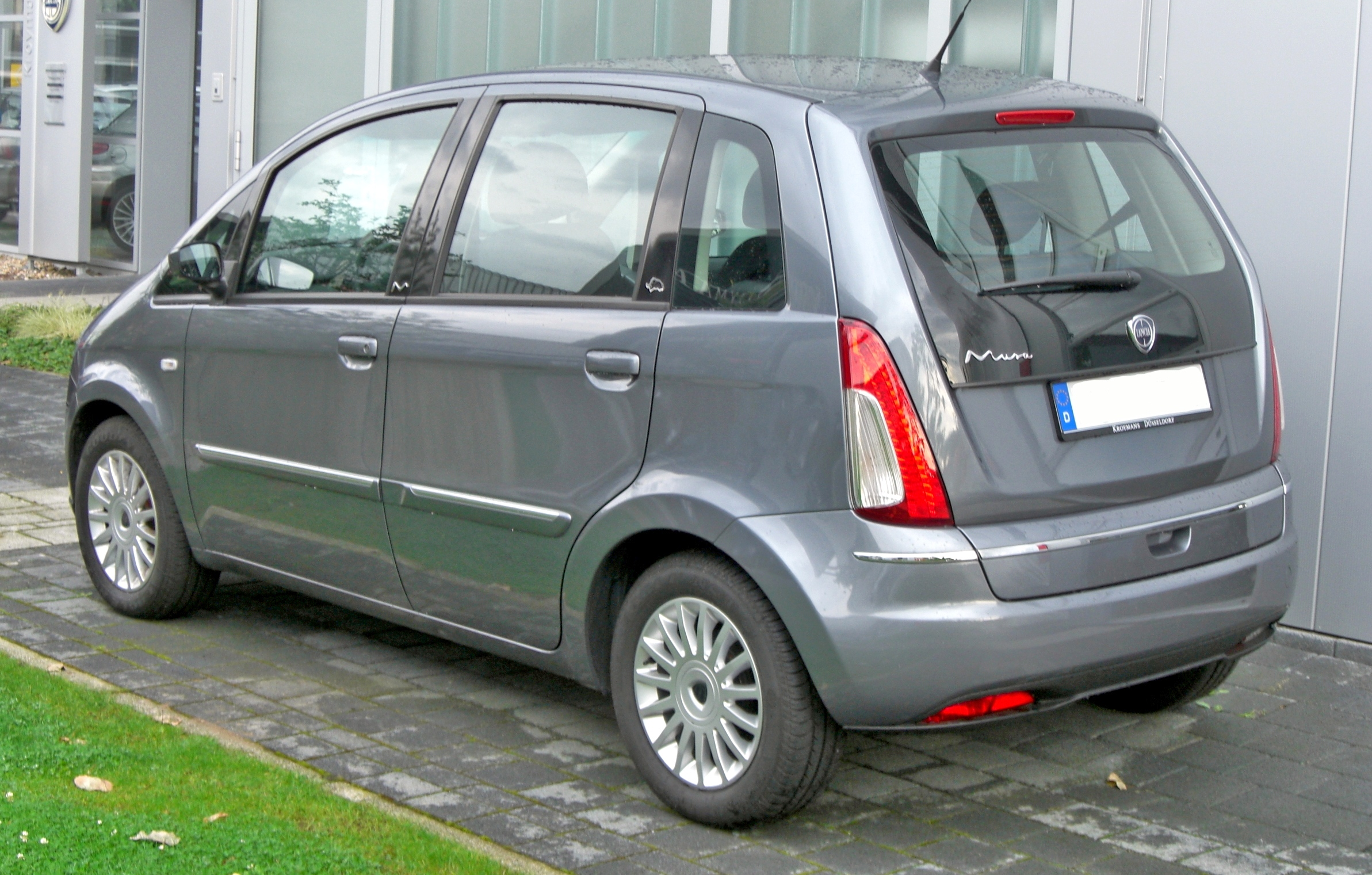
Lancia Musa (2008–2012)

Options including FCA's integrated In Vehicle Infotainment system (marketed as Blue&Me), new body colours and equipment. In 2008, for the market in Italy, Lancia introduced the EcoChic version with 1.4 Fire 8v dual power (LPG and petrol) engine. In 2009, Lancia introduced a start-stop system with the 1.4 Fire 16v and 1.3 Multijet II Euro 5 engines, the latter with 95 PS (70 kW; 94 hp).

== Engines ==
Model	Engine	Displacement	Power	Torque	Years
Petrol engines
1.4 8V LPG	straight-4	1368 cc	77 PS (57 kW; 76 hp) @ 6000 rpm	115 N⋅m (85 lb⋅ft) @ 3000 rpm	from 2005
1.4 16V	straight-4	1368 cc	95 PS (70 kW; 94 hp) @ 5800 rpm	128 N⋅m (94 lb⋅ft) @ 4500 rpm	
Diesel engines
1.3 Multijet 16V	straight-4	1248 cc	70 PS (51 kW; 69 hp) @ 4000 rpm	180 N⋅m (133 lb⋅ft) @ 1750 rpm	
1.3 Multijet 16V	straight-4	1248 cc	95 PS (70 kW; 94 hp) @ 4000 rpm	200 N⋅m (148 lb⋅ft) @ 1500 rpm	from 2006
1.6 Multijet 16V	straight-4	1598 cc	120 PS (88 kW; 118 hp) @ 4000 rpm	300 N⋅m (221 lb⋅ft) @ 1500 rpm	from 2008
1.9 Multijet 8V	straight-4	1910 cc	101 PS (74 kW; 100 hp) @ 4000 rpm	259 N⋅m (191 lb⋅ft) @ 1750 rpm	2004–2008
