= Antonio Dal Monte =

Italian physician, physiologist and canoer

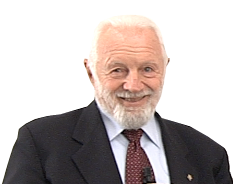
- Born: 31 October 1931 (age 94); Rome

Antonio Dal Monte (born October 31, 1931, in Rome) is an Italian physician. He is the former Scientific Director and Head of the Department of Physiology and Biomechanics Institute of Sports Science of the Italian National Olympic Committee (C.O.N.I.).

== Early life ==
Dal Monte graduated from the faculty of Medicine and Surgery at the University of Rome, then obtained a teaching qualification in Physiology Human and Sports Medicine. He is also a specialist in Pneumology, Occupational Medicine, and in aerospace medicine.

== Career ==
Dal Monte served as Scientific Director and Head of the Department of Physiology and Biomechanics Institute of Science of the Italian National Olympic Committee Sport (CONI).

He is one of the founders of the science of functional evaluation of athletes. He taught at the School of Specialization in Sports Medicine for Doctor of the University of Rome La Sapienza, of the Catholic University of Sacred Heart of Rome and of the University of L'Aquila.

For more than 35 years, Dal Monte consulted with Fiat (FCA) in the field of the vehicle seat and on-board instrumentation design as well as the study of ergonomic driving positions and posture of race vehicles, motorboats, aircraft, and gliders — to understand and optimize the operational relationship of man and machine. Consulting with Fiat (FCA), Dal Monte designed seats for the Fiat Idea using biometric principles developed at the Italian National Olympic Committee's sports medicine institute.

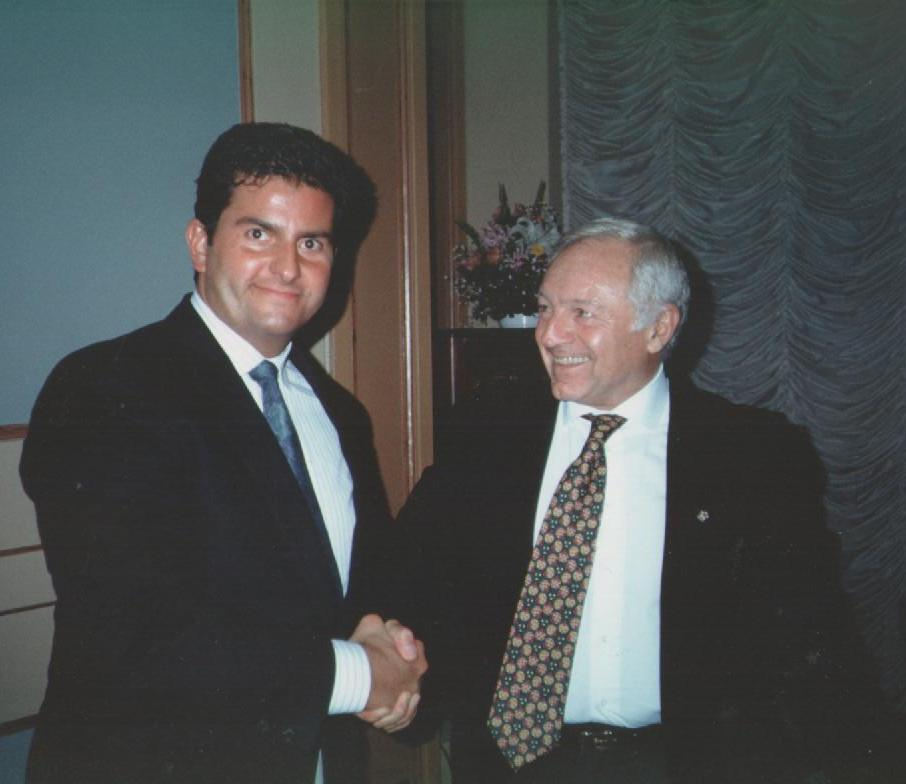
Paolo Tassetto together with Prof. Antonio Dal Monte

Dal Monte carried out scientific work in the field of evaluation of cardio-circulatory, respiratory, metabolic, and biomechanical of athletes, reflected in the publication of books, monographs, and articles. He designed numerous devices, notably an ergometer for the field study of athletes and for the laboratory simulation of the sporting gesture.

== Recognition ==
- 2006 Honorary Doctorate in Sciences and Techniques of Sports (University of L'Aquila)
