= Sollers - Naberezhnye Chelny =

Russian automotive company

- Formerly: Zavod Malolitrazhnykh Avtomobiley
- Industry: Automotive
- Founded: 1987; 39 years ago
- Headquarters: Naberezhnye Chelny, Russia
- Parent: Sollers JSC

Sollers - Naberezhnye Chelny is a car plant of the Sollers JSC group located in Naberezhnye Chelny, Russia. It was formerly a carmaking company known as ZMA (Russian: ЗМА, Завод малолитражных автомобилей, romanized: Zavod Malolitrazhnykh Avtomobiley) and produced the Oka micro-car under VAZ license.

Since 2015 the plant manufactures a Ford Fiesta sedan variant and Ford EcoSport on behalf of the Ford Sollers joint venture.

== History ==
ZMA Logo

ZMA (Завод малолитражных автомобилей (ЗМА), Zavod Malolitrajnykh Avtomobileï, "plant of small displacement engine cars") was a Russian manufacturer of small cars. It was created on the basis of Decree No. 575 of 21 June 1985 the Council of Ministers of the USSR, as a standalone company, a subsidiary of KamAZ . Its headquarters are in Naberezhnye Chelny (Tatarstan). The plant construction was completed in November 1987 and the first car - a 1111-КамАЗ "Кама" came off the assembly line Dec. 21, 1987.

The company was purchased in March 2005 by Severstal-Avto who decided to stop production of old models and convert the company into the assembly and production of cars on behalf of foreign automakers.

== Models ==
=== Current ===
- SsangYong Rexton (since fall 2006)

=== Discontinued ===
- Oka (1992–2006)
- Fiat Palio (CKD, since spring 2007 to December 2010)
- Fiat Albea (CKD, since spring 2007 to December 2010)
- Fiat Doblò (CKD, since spring 2007 to December 2010)

== See also ==
- Fiat-Sollers
- Ford Sollers
