= Fiat Siena =

Compact car produced by Fiat

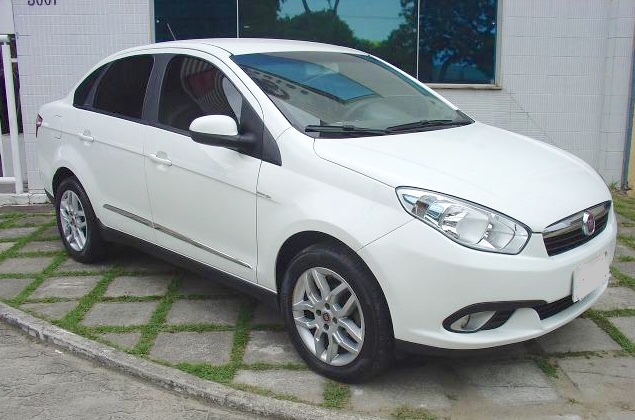

Overview
- Manufacturer: Fiat
- Also called: Fiat Grand Siena; Fiat Palio Sedan (Mexico); Fiat Perla (China); Fiat Petra (India); Dodge Forza (Venezuela); Dodge Vision (Mexico); Pyeonghwa Hwiparam (North Korea); Zotye Z200 (China)
- Production: 1996–2021

Body and chassis
- Class: Subcompact car
- Body style: 4-door sedan 5-door station wagon
- Layout: FF layout

Chronology
- Predecessor: Fiat Duna
- Successor: Fiat Cronos; Dodge Neon (for Dodge Vision, Mexico)

The Fiat Siena is a subcompact car produced by the Italian manufacturer Fiat from 1996 to 2021. It is the four-door sedan version of the Fiat Palio, a supermini car especially designed for developing countries. It was introduced for the first time in South America, and was produced in various countries worldwide. Later, in 2002, a similar car based on the same platform was developed for the European market, the Fiat Albea. It replaced the Siena in these European markets, such as Poland and Turkey, where the original model was previously sold.

In 2012, Fiat released the second generation of the Siena, called the Fiat Grand Siena.

The Siena was one of the most popular saloons in Brazil, selling in over 800,000 units throughout 14 years of presence. In Italy the car was not marketed, after the flop of the predecessor Fiat Duna.

== First generation (178; 1996) ==
First generation
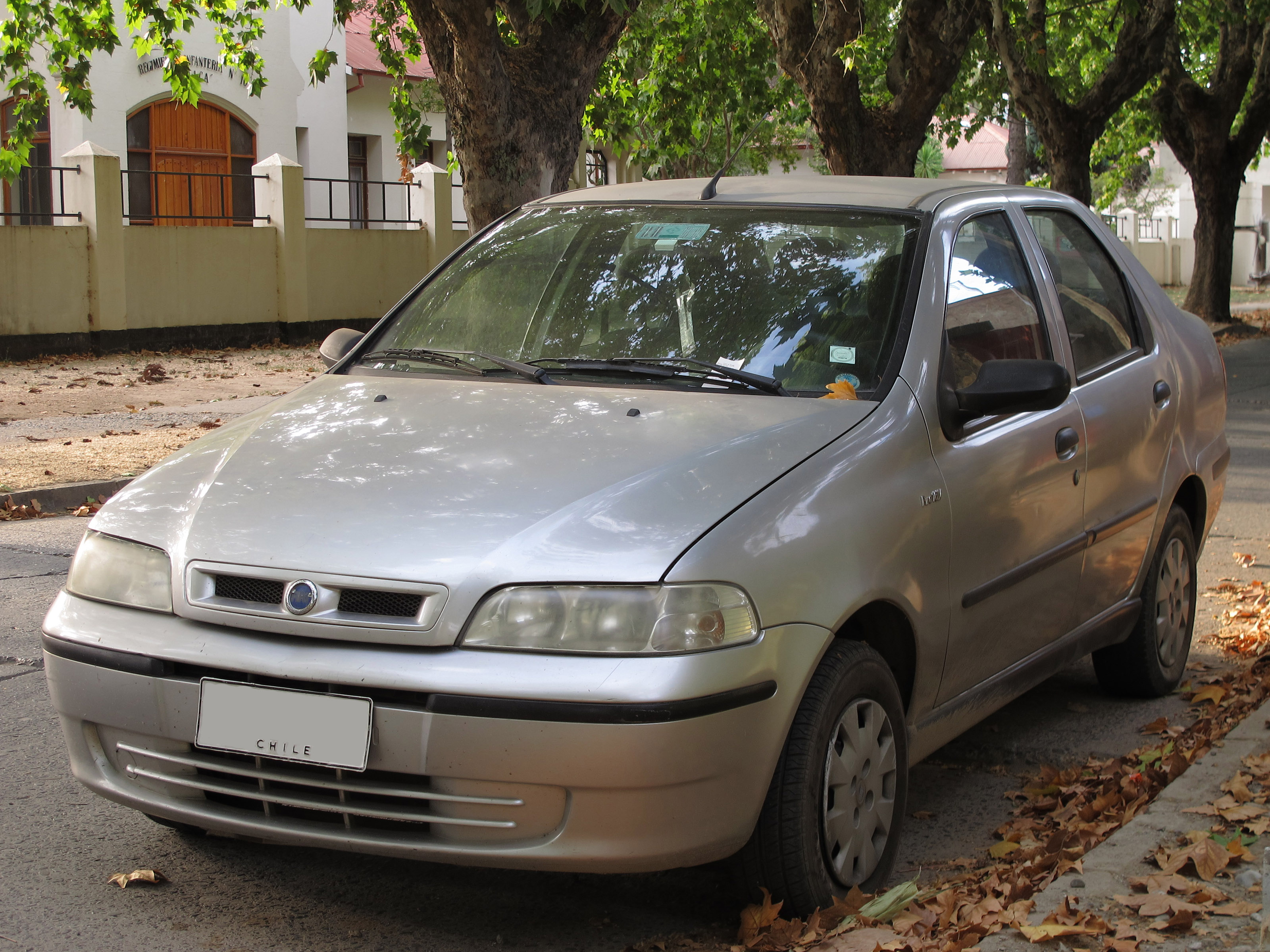
- 2001 Fiat Siena

Overview
- Model code: 178
- Also called: Fiat Petra (India); Fiat Palio Sedan (Mexico); Pyeonghwa Hwiparam (North Korea); Dodge Forza (Venezuela); Dodge Vision (Mexico)
- Production: 1996–2016
- Assembly: Brazil: Betim (Fiat Brazil); Argentina: Ferreyra (Fiat Argentina); China: Nanjing (Nanjing Fiat: 2002–2006); Turkey: Bursa (Tofaş); Poland: Bielsko-Biała & Tychy (Fiat Auto Poland); India: Ranjangaon, Pune (Fiat India); Iran: Saveh (PIDF); South Africa: Rosslyn (Nissan South Africa); Morocco: Casablanca (SOMACA); North Korea: Nampo (Pyeonghwa Motors: 2002–2006); Ho Chi Minh City, Vietnam (Mekong Auto); Venezuela: La Victoria; Venezuela: Valencia, Carabobo (Chrysler)
- Designer: Justyn Norek at I.DE.A Institute (1996); Giorgetto Giugiaro at Italdesign (2001, 2004); Centre Stile Fiat Brazil (2007)

Body and chassis
- Body style: 4-door sedan 5-door station wagon
- Layout: Front-engine, front-wheel-drive
- Platform: Tipo Uno (Type One)
- Related: Fiat Albea; Fiat Perla; Fiat Palio; Fiat Punto (176); Fiat Strada; Zotye Z200

Powertrain
- Engine: 1.0 L FIRE I4 gasoline 1.0 L FIRE Evo I4 flex fuel 1.0 L Fiasa I4 gasoline 1.3 L FIRE I4 flex fuel 1.3 L 4A90 I4 gasoline (China); 1.4 L FIRE Evo I4 tetrafuel 1.5 L Fiasa I4 flex fuel 1.5 L 4A91 I4 gasoline (China); 1.6 L Torque I4 gasoline 1.6 L E.torQ I4 flex fuel 1.8 L GM N18XFH I4 gasoline 1.7 L TD I4 diesel
- Transmission: 5-speed manual 6-speed manual 4 speed automatic (China)

Dimensions
- Wheelbase: 2,360 mm (93 in) (1996–01); 2,373 mm (93.4 in) (2001–07); 2,374 mm (93.5 in) (2007–11)
- Length: 4,100 mm (160 in) (1996–01); 4,135 mm (162.8 in) (2001–07); 4,155 mm (163.6 in) (2007–11)
- Width: 1,614 mm (63.5 in) (1996–01); 1,634 mm (64.3 in) (2001–07); 1,639 mm (64.5 in) (2007–11)
- Height: 1,445 mm (56.9 in) (1996–01); 1,453 mm (57.2 in) (2001–07); 1,425 mm (56.1 in) (2007–11)

Chronology
- Predecessor: Fiat Duna
- Successor: Fiat Cronos

=== 1996–2000 ===
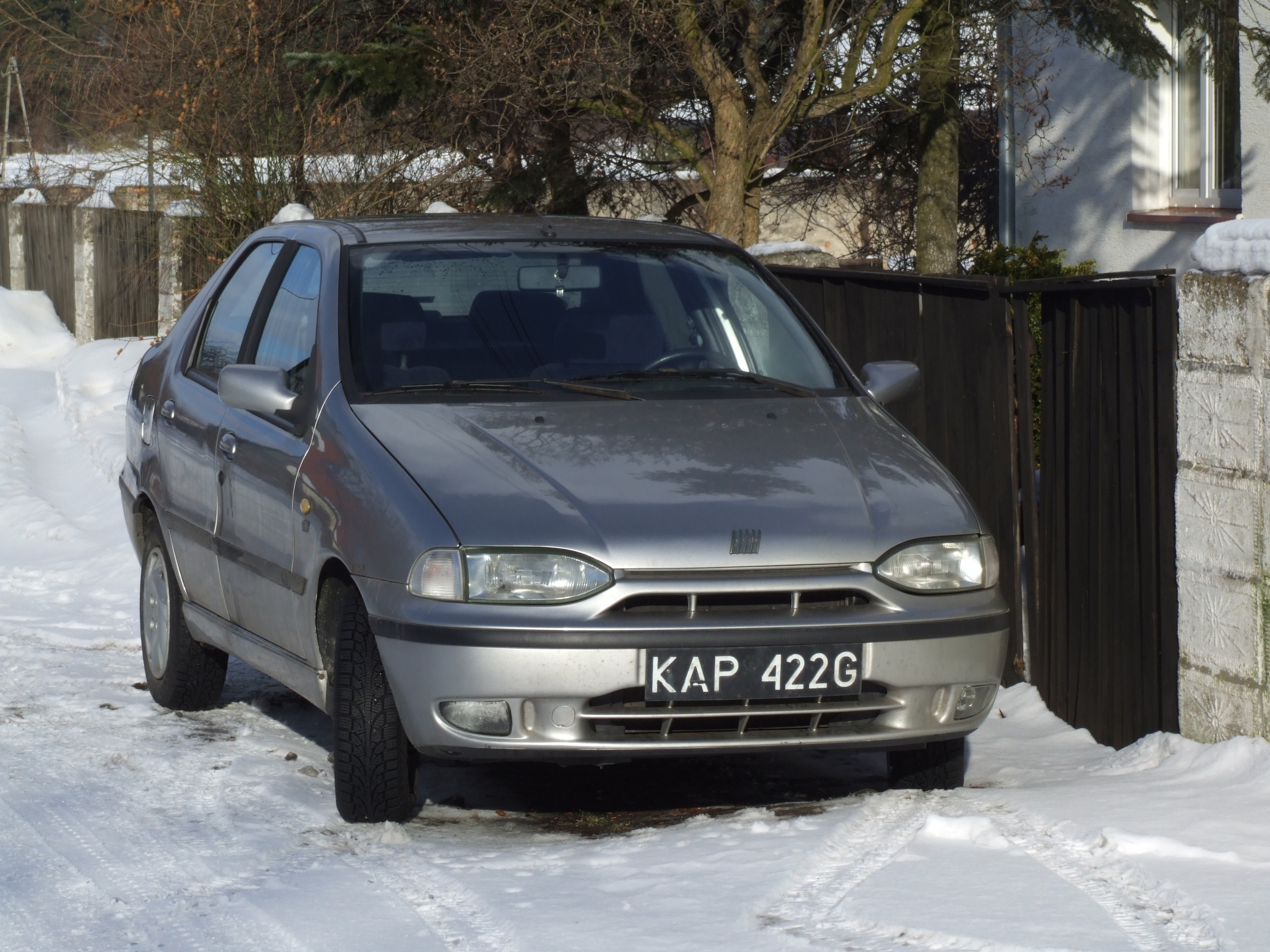
1996–2000 Fiat Siena

The original Siena was launched in Argentina in late 1996 and in Brazil in August 1997, as the four-door sedan of the Fiat Palio, whose code name was Type 178. The Siena was created due to the important sales benchmarks of hatchback models in developing countries. The range was made from Fiasa and Fire 1.0 L to 1.6 L gasoline engines.

=== 2000–2006 ===
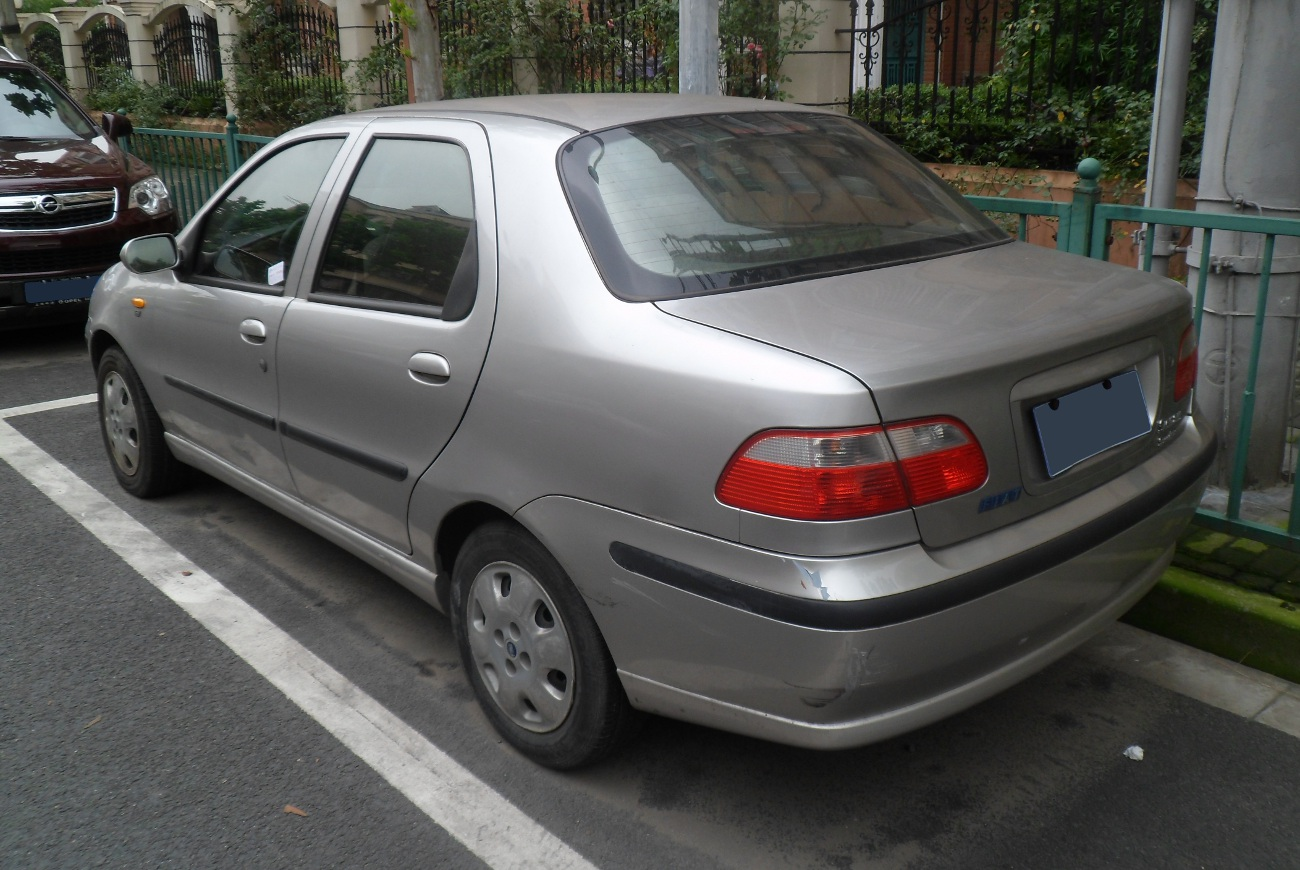
2001 Fiat Albea

In 2000, the model received its first facelift. It was designed by Giorgetto Giugiaro of Italdesign. The facelift included new front and rear fascias and a brand-new interior. It also came with new engines: the 16-valve Fire engines 1.0 L 70 HP and the 1.2 L 82 HP. In Turkey and China, the redesign Siena was introduced with a "Speedgear" Continuously variable transmission. With this new design, the small car was finally able to fight for its place in the market, becoming a success in sales. Fiat had considered changing the name to Palio Sedan, due to the lack of interest on the previous Siena, and the solid sales of its biggest competitor, the Chevrolet Prisma. This idea was later discarded. Up to this point, the Fiat Siena was the only model belonging to the Palio family that had not been well accepted by the community. Therefore, Fiat gave special attention to the design of this model, in particular, having its rear entirely redesigned.

=== 2004–2012 ===
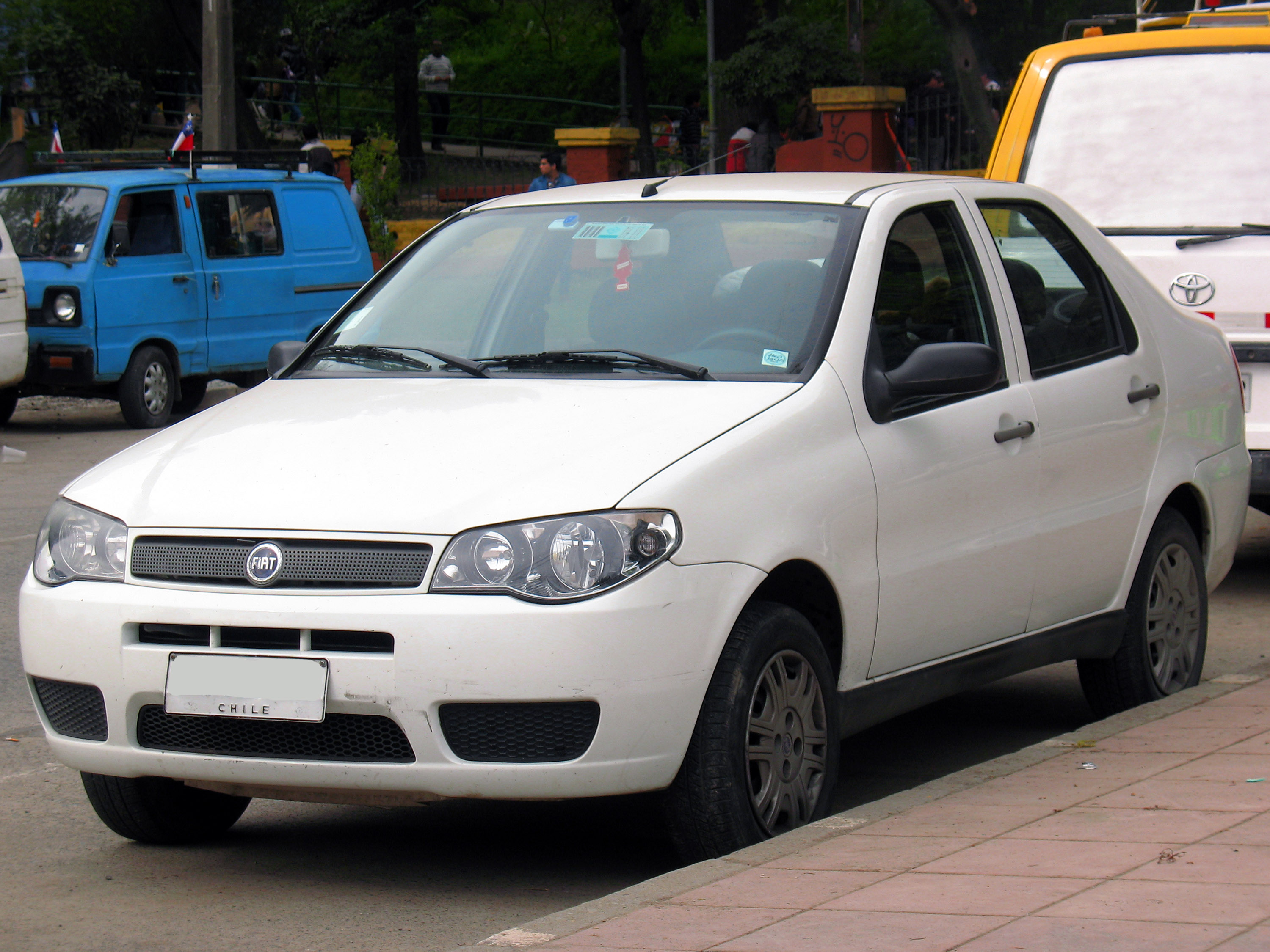
2004 Fiat Siena

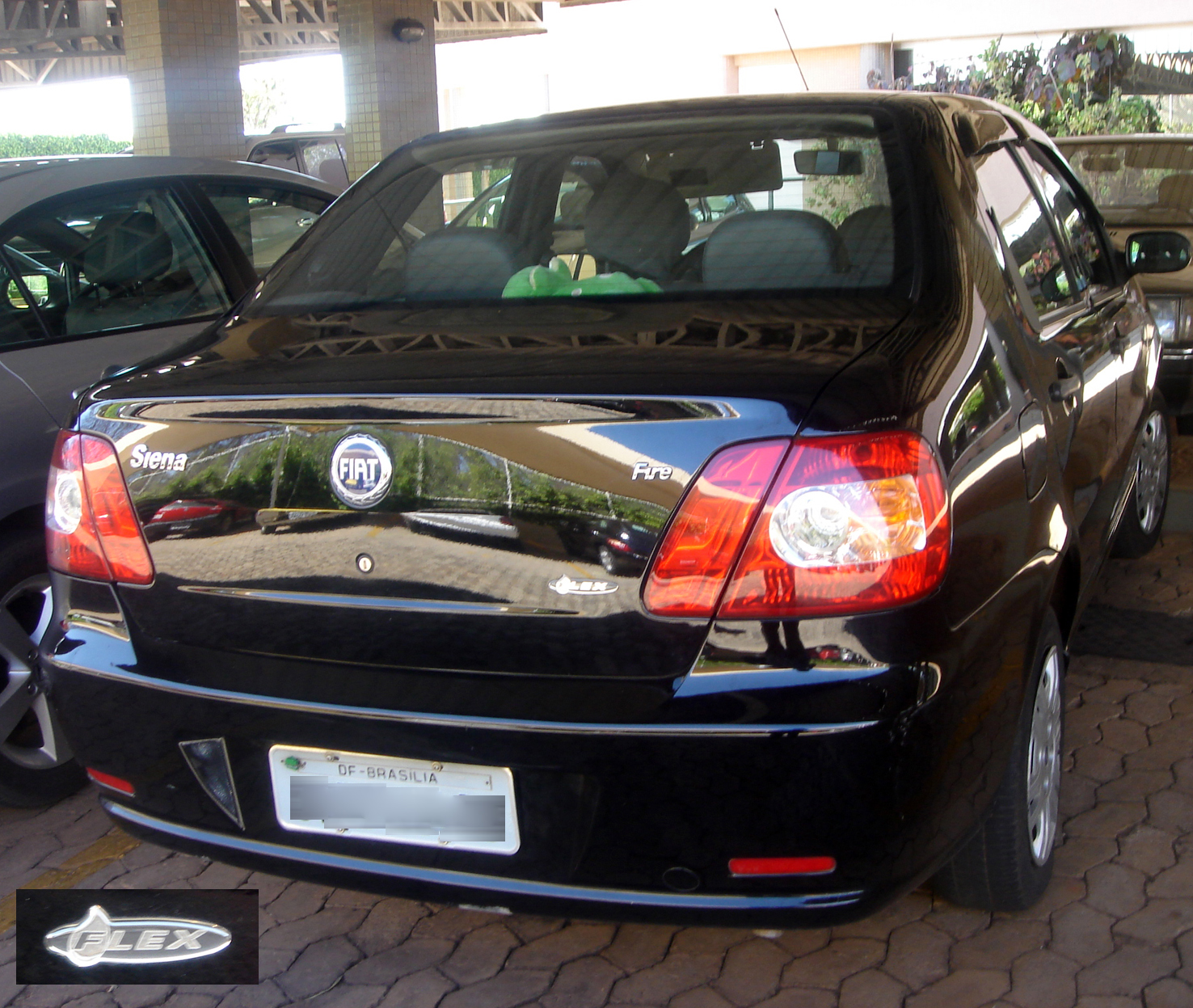
2004 Fiat Siena

A second facelift was presented in 2004. The designer was again Giorgetto Giugiaro. It has a new front, rear, and interior design. The 2004 Siena was the first Brazilian compact 4-door sedan with four airbags (two at front and two side airbags), auto-dimming rear-view mirror, rain sensor and park assistance. These accessories, however, are very expensive for the Brazilian and most other South American markets, so they are generally not found in end-use vehicles. The engines range in South America from a 1.3 Fire 16-valve, a new 1.4 Fire 8-valve with 80 HP (the same of the latest Fiat Punto, and a 1.8 GM Powertrain 8-valve with 112 PS (82 kW), shared with the Chevrolet Corsa). The Siena EL was sold with 1.0 and 1.4 engines, both 8-valve units.

In Brazil, the top model has been equipped by the flex fuel version of the latter 1.8 Powertrain 8-valve – gasoline and/or alcohol – reaching 112 hp (84 kW) with gasoline and 114 hp (85 kW) with alcohol at 5,500 rpm. In Mexico is sold as Palio Sedan, first with the 1.6 16v Torque engine and later with the 1.8 GM Powertrain with 110 PS (81 kW).

In Europe, the new model features the 2004 front and interior design and a 2001 rear design. The Albea, European version of the Siena, also gained the 1.3 Multijet diesel engine, a second generation common rail turbocharged engine, developing 70 bhp (52 kW).

=== 2007–2016 ===
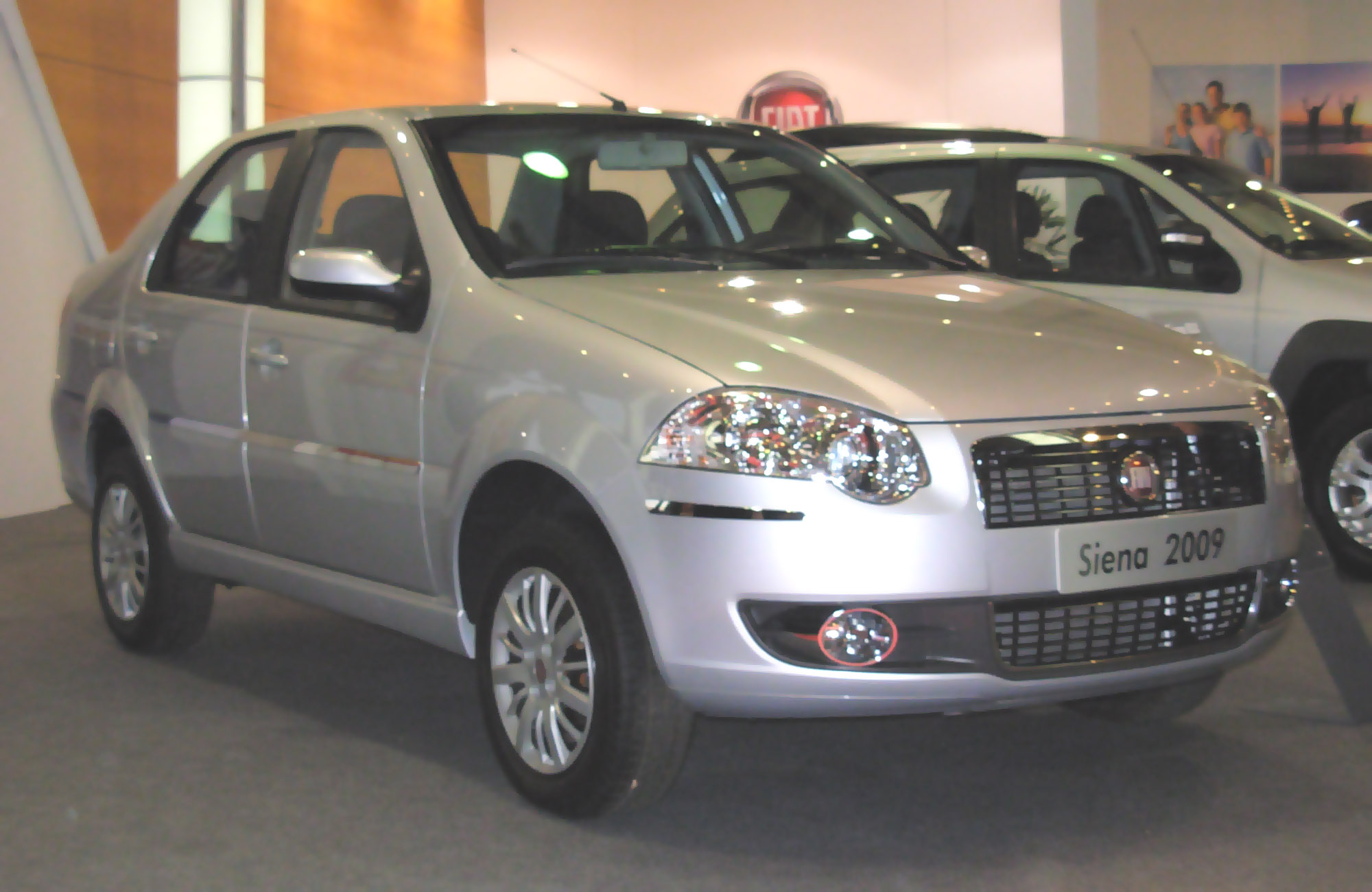
2008 Fiat Siena

In 2007, Fiat unveiled the facelifted Siena. This fourth version of the model has a unique front design, which for the first time is different from the current Palio.

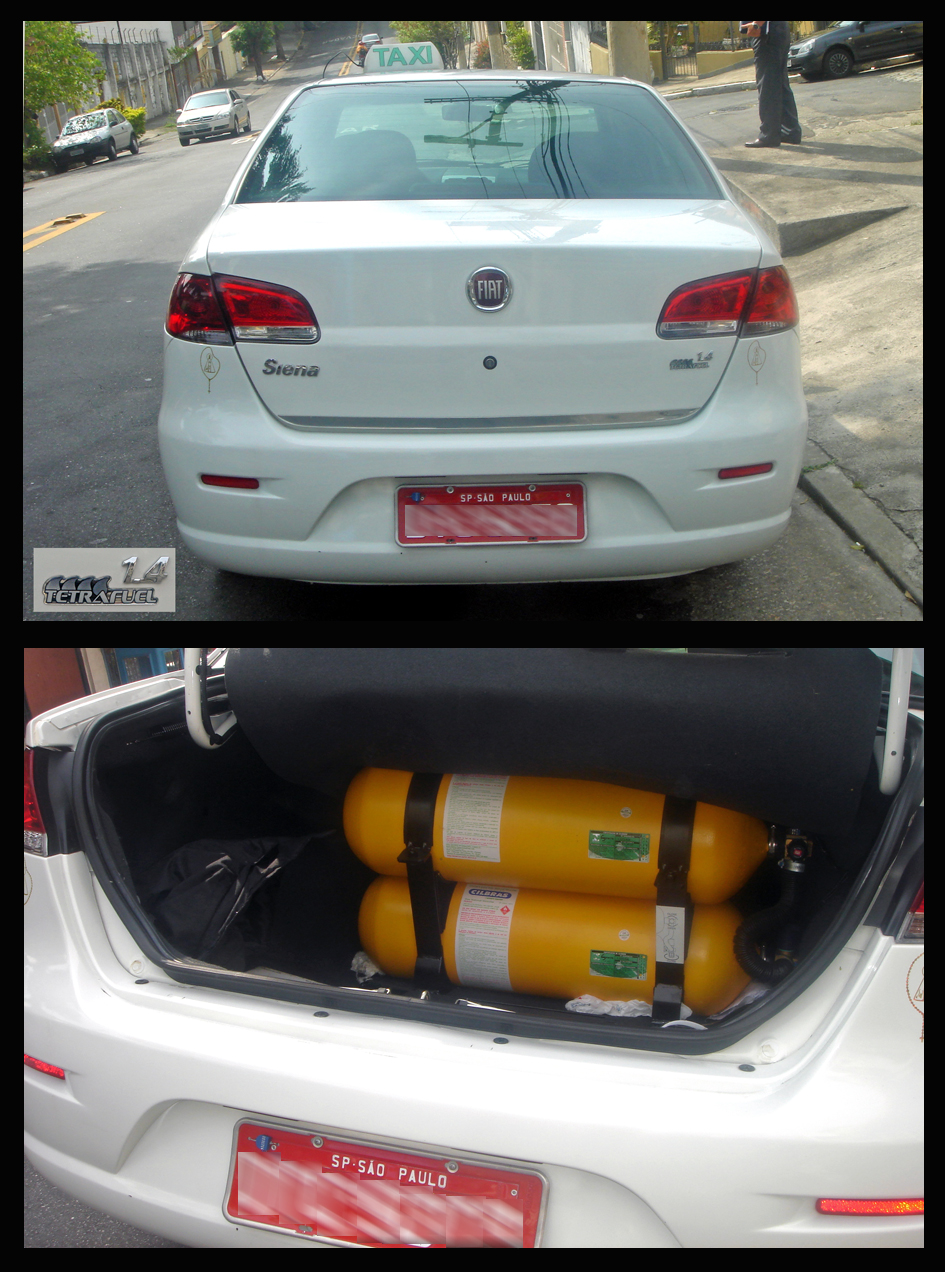
2008 Fiat Siena Tetrafuel 1.4. Below is shown the CNG storage tanks in the trunk

The new Siena follows the new Fiat 'family face', with double front lights and some chrome details in the grille, and around the fog lights. The rear lights are sharp and integrated with the trunk and appeared to be inspired by models of Alfa Romeo, like the 156 and 159.

The new Siena is in production at Betim (Brazil) and Córdoba (Argentina), with 1.0 8v, 1.4 8v, 1.4 8v TetraFuel, and 1.8 8v engines, flexible for the Brazilian market (capable of using gasoline and ethanol). The TetraFuel is the first multifuel car that can run as a flexi-fuel on pure gasoline, or E25, or E100; or runs as a bi-fuel with natural gas (CNG). As of 2011, the sportive version – Siena Sporting 1.6R 16v, equipped with Fiat's Dualogic automatic gearbox – were also in production, although Fiat announced that this variant won't be offered anymore from 2012. All the New Siena EL 1.0, EL 1.4 and many ELX versions circulating at Brazil were, actually, manufactured at Argentina, as Betim's factory is still producing only the more expensive versions.

=== Production ===
It was produced in Brazil (Betim Plant) and Argentina (Ferreyra). In the past it was also produced in Turkey (Bursa), Poland (Tychy) (1997–2001), India (Pune) (1999–2004), South Africa (Rosslyn), China (Nanjing), Iran (Saveh), Morocco (Casablanca) and Vietnam.

It has also been built under license in Nampo, North Korea from 2002 to 2006, as the Pyeonghwa Hwiparam. It is built by complete knockdown kits from Vietnam. It comes with two engines options: a 1.3 litre and 1.6 litre, both paired to a 5 speed manual transmission.

In 2013, Venezuelan production of a Siena launched with "Dodge Forza" badges. The Dodge Forza received a 1.4-liter, CNG-powered FIRE four-cylinder engine and a five-speed manual transmission.

The production of the first generation of Siena officially ends in October 2016.

=== Sales ===
The following columns show the sales figures of the Fiat Siena in Brazil and Argentina.

Year	Brazil	Argentina
1997	7,183	
1998	21,650	
1999	16,401	
2000	13,890	
2001	33,558	
2002	32,259	
2003	37,227	
2004	40,760	
2005	43,529	
2006	56,358	7,672
2007	88,734	9,671
2008	95,307	14,121
2009	116,064	11,032
2010	120,520	13,238
2011	90,072	16,341
2012	106,085	14,150
2013	129,832	15,369
2014	106,973	14,454
2015	59,397	16,299
2016	33,478	13,882
2017	24,955	11,185
2018	17,470	2,908
2019	16,188	
2020	10,857	
2021	15,358	
2022	4,142	
2023	21	
Subtotal	1,338,268	160,322
Total	1,498,590	

=== China ===
==== Siena ====
In November 2001, the Fiat Palio debuted on the Chinese market, with either the 60 PS (44 kW) 1.2-liter or the 85 PS (63 kW) 1.5-liter, followed by the Siena (effectively the large-wheelbase version, the Albea) in November 2002, and the Palio Weekend in June 2003. The Siena and Weekend were not available with the smaller engine.

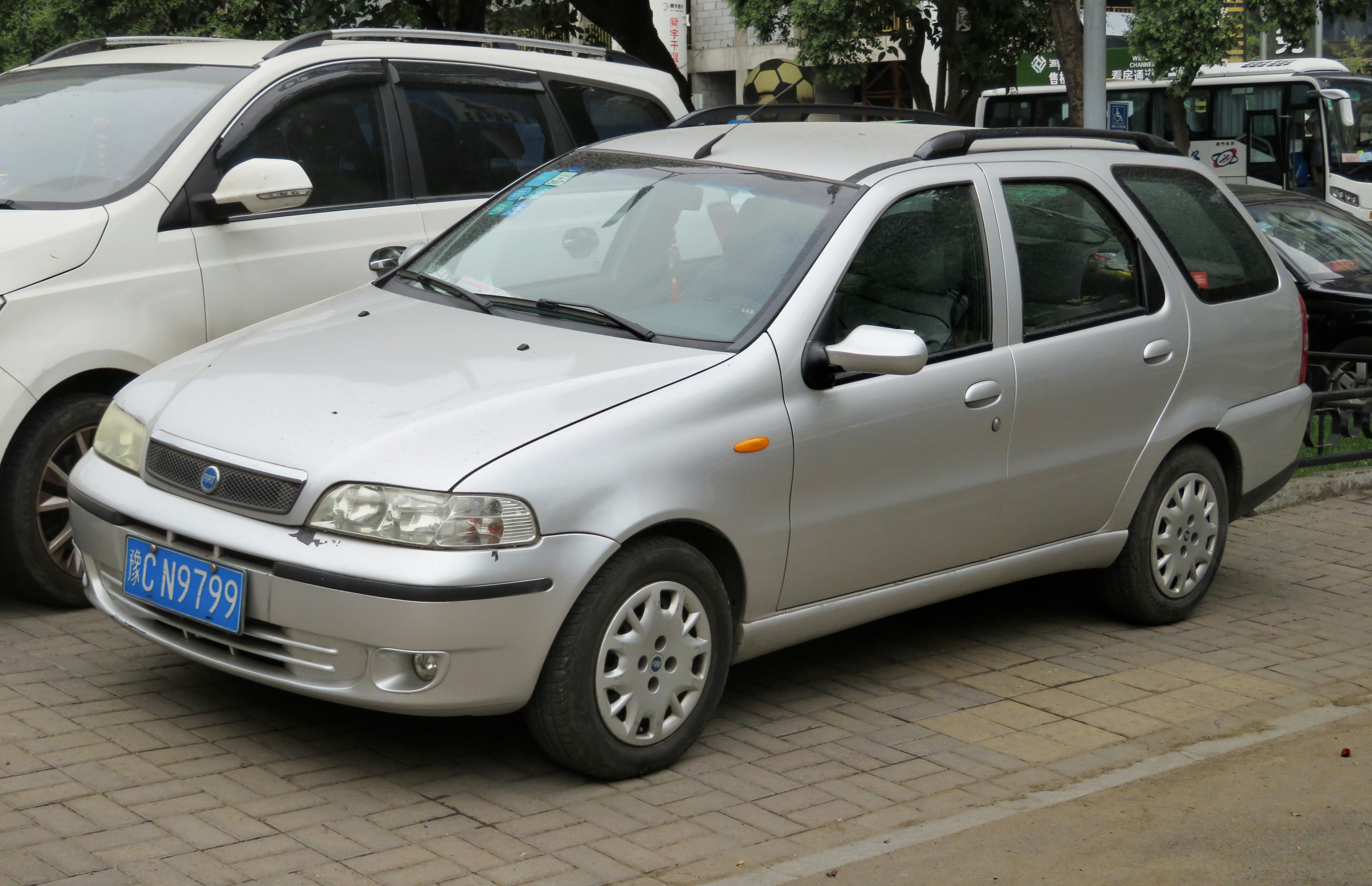
Nanjing-Fiat Palio Weekend

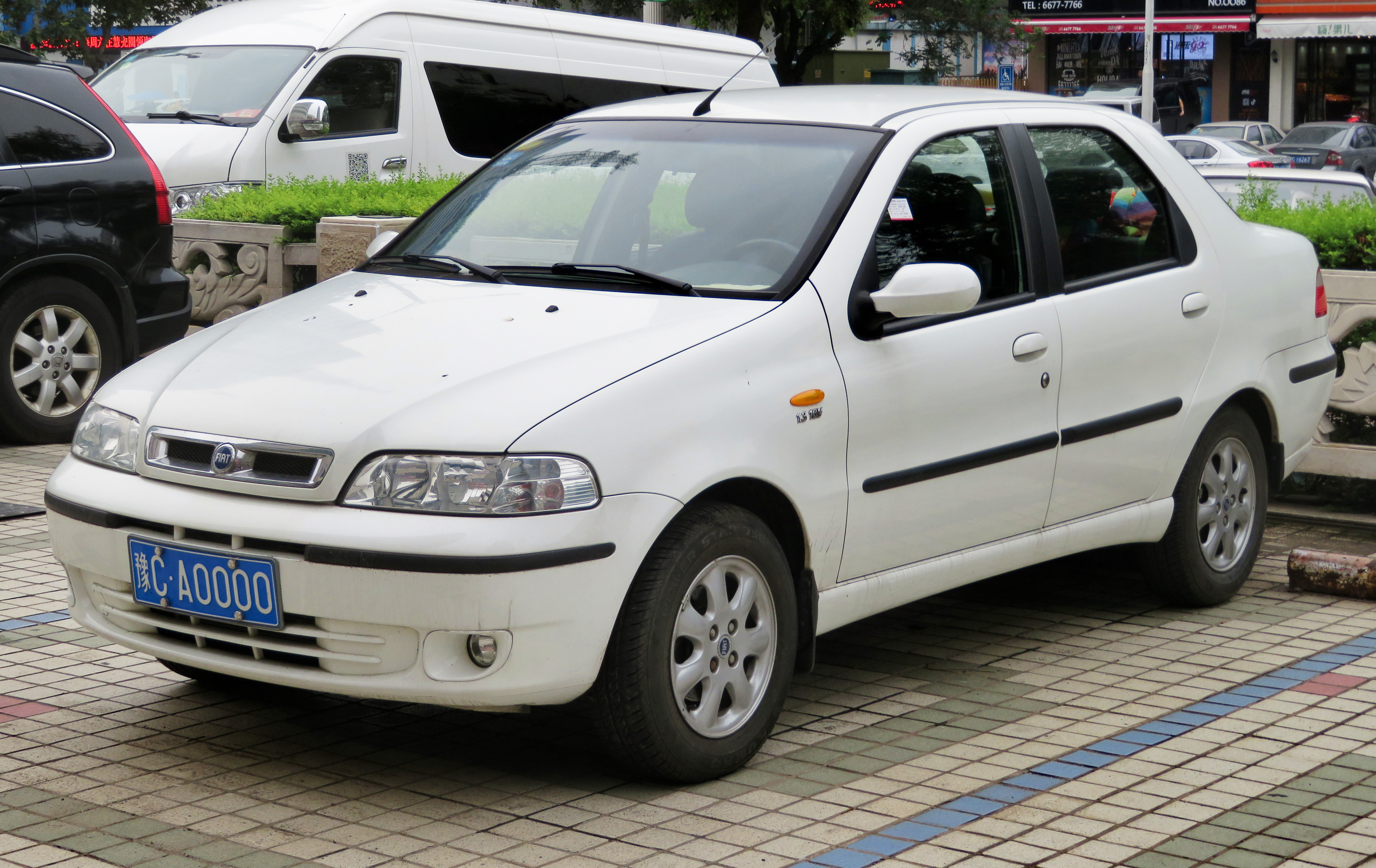
Nanjing-Fiat Siena

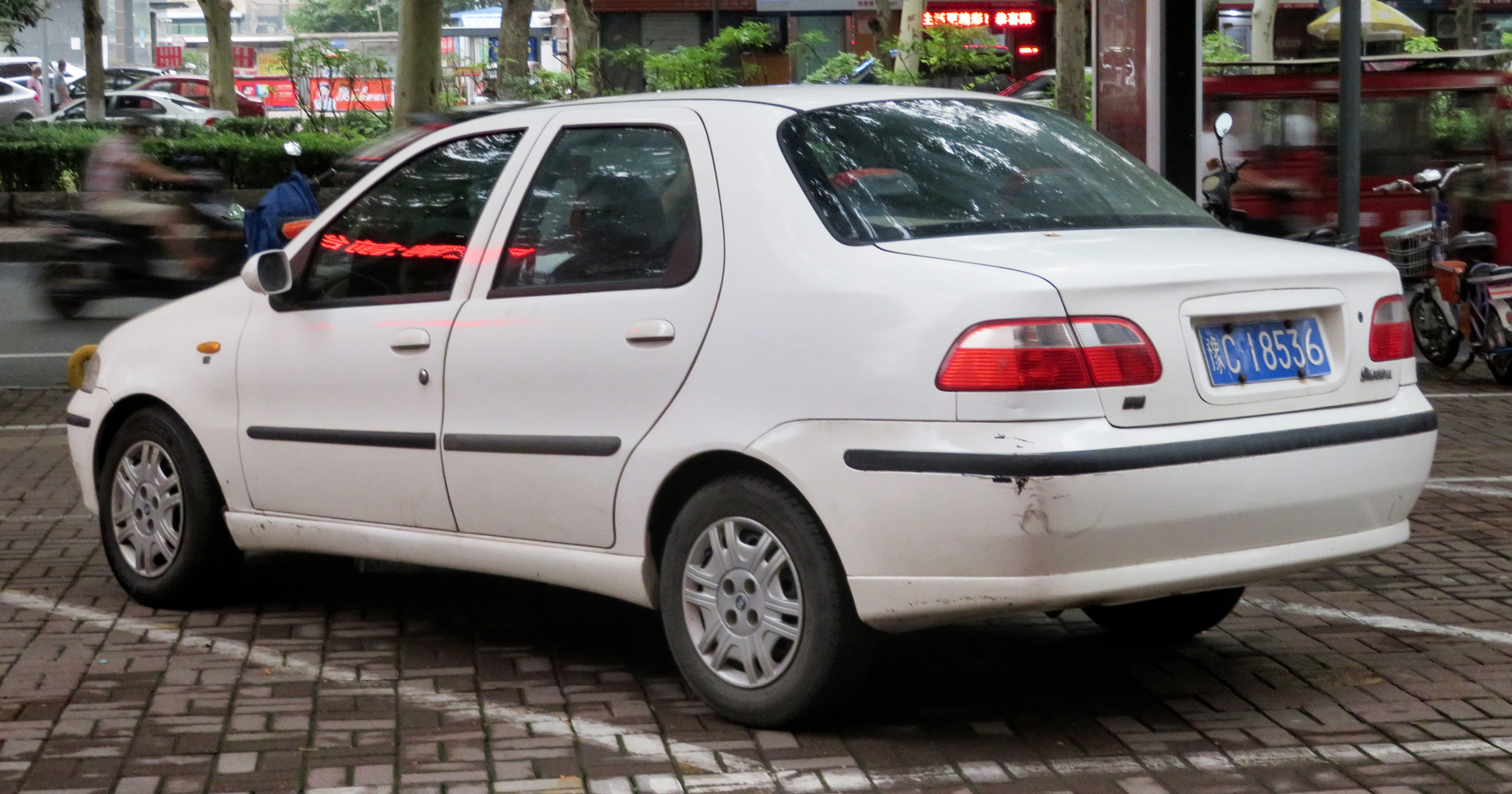
Nanjing-Fiat Siena (rear)

==== Perla ====
The Nanjing Fiat Perla, launched at the 2006 Auto Guangzhou Motor Show, is based on the Fiat Albea platform. The car's rear got a more profound facelift for the Chinese market. For example, the rear is longer and lower than the Siena. It has a new 1.7-liter gasoline engine, air conditioning, dual front airbags, anti-lock brakes, power steering, power windows, central locking, and many other features. The engine has a maximum power output of 96 PS (71 kW) and a maximum torque of 140 N⋅m (103 lb⋅ft) at 4,000 rpm, satisfying the Euro III emission standards. The length is 4,316 mm (169.9 in), the width is 1,705 mm (67.1 in), the height is 1,480 mm (58.3 in), the wheelbase is 2,439 mm (96.0 in), and the curb weight is 1,260 kg (2,780 lb).

Since Fiat withdrew from Nanjing in 2007 and SAIC took over, discontinuing the Fiat models, the Perla only had a very brief existence. Russia was meant to be the first country outside China to receive the Perla, but with the 1.4 L Fire 8v engine with 77 PS (57 kW) and the Speedgear transmission.

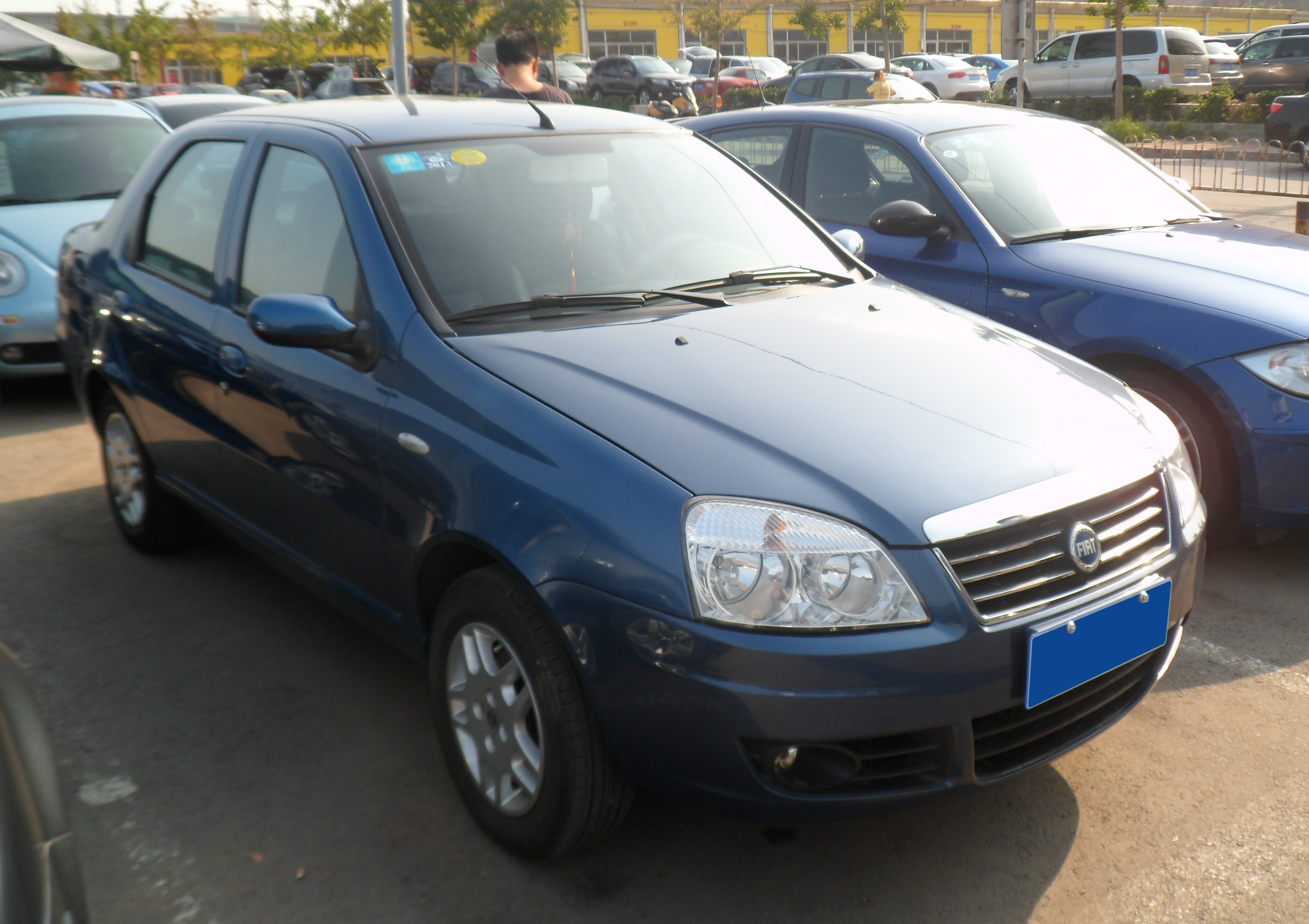
Fiat Perla (China)

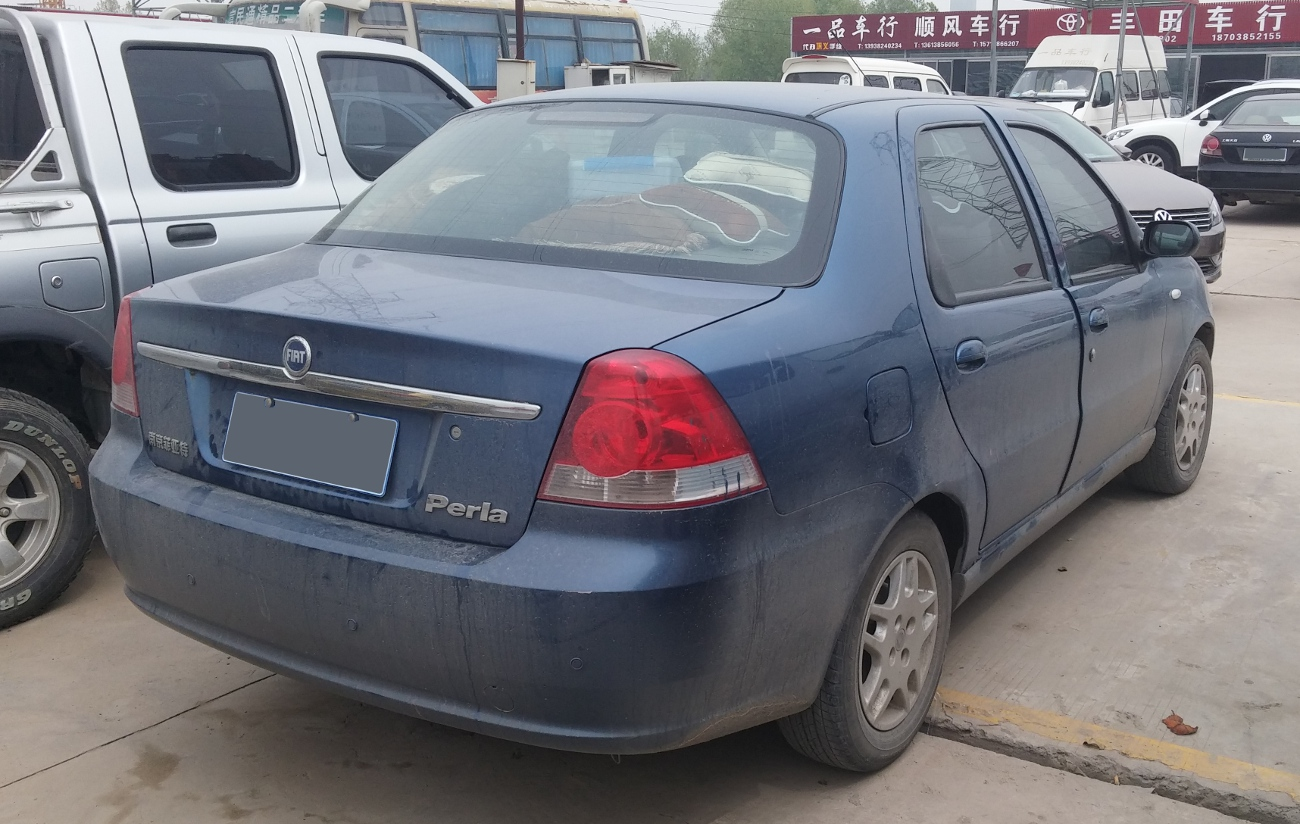
Fiat Perla rear (China)

==== Zotye ====
In 2008, Zotye Auto purchased the tooling for the Palio and the Siena, and in 2011, launched its own restyled version of the car, the Zotye Z200, which is produced in both hatchback and sedan form. They are now powered by a range of a 1.3-liter and a 1.5-liter gasoline engines, with four valves per cylinder and variable valve timing, reportedly sourced from Mitsubishi, which are able to develop between 92 and 118 hp (69 and 88 kW) and between 126 and 147 N⋅m (93 and 108 lb⋅ft) of torque. Production ran from 2011 to 2014.

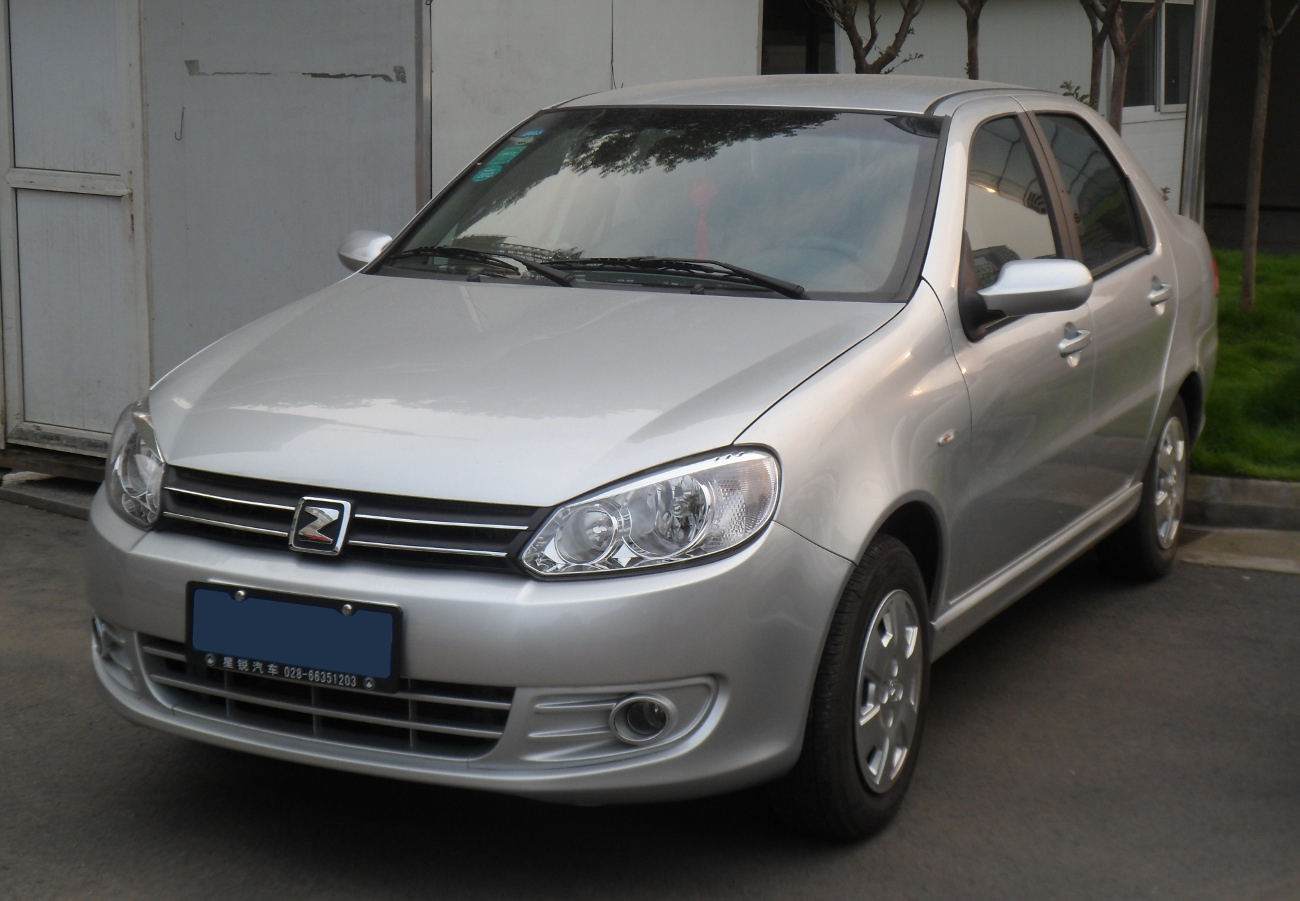
Zotye Z200 (sedan)

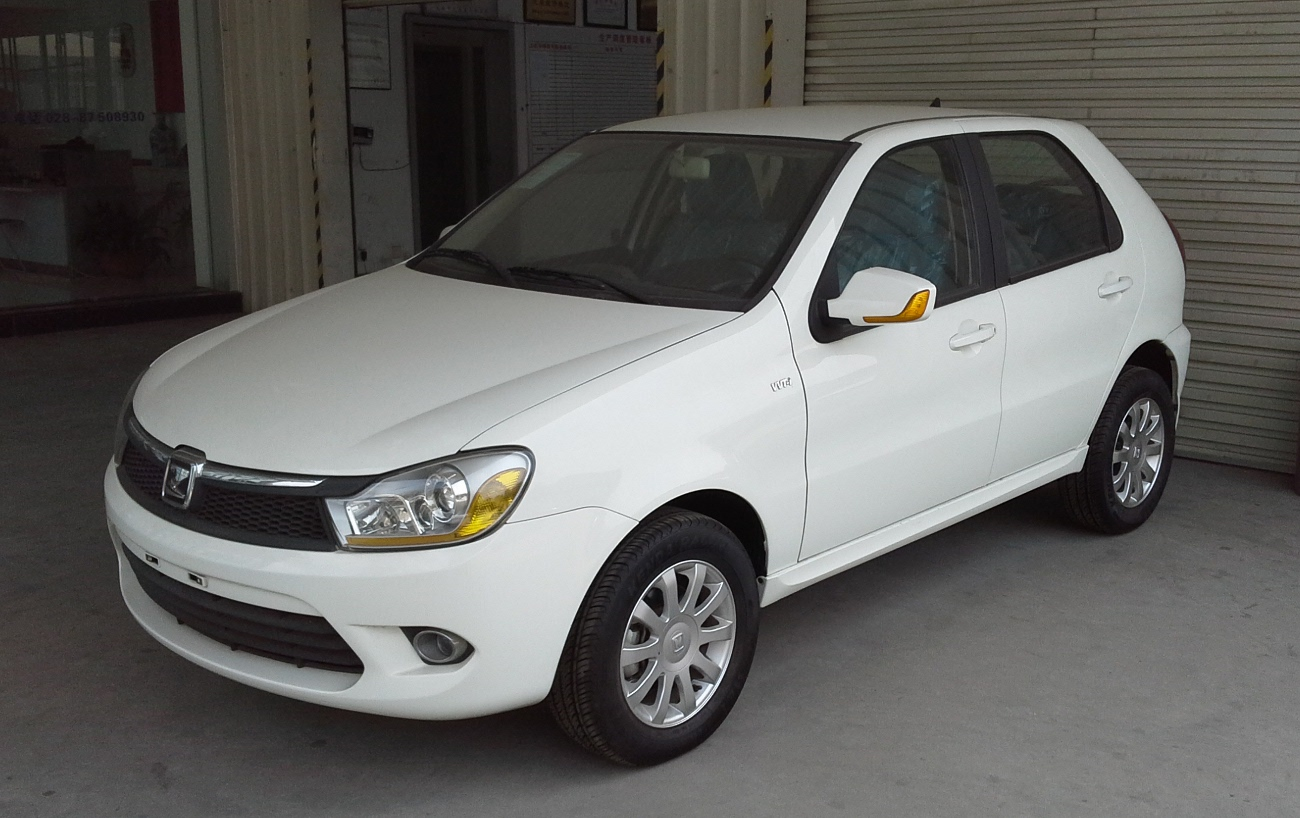
Zotye Z200 (hatch)

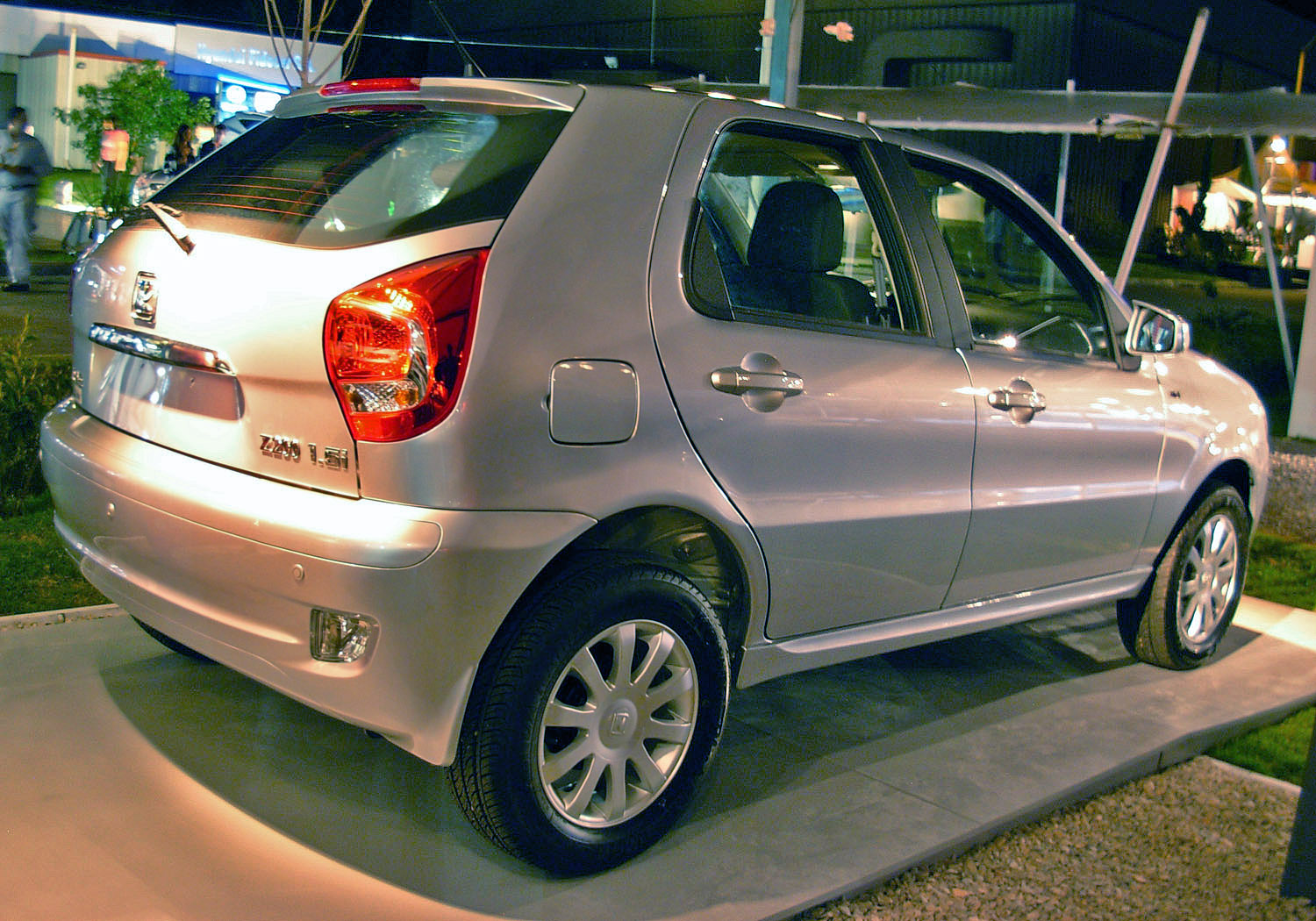
Zotye Z200 (hatch)

=== Safety rating ===
The Fiat Albea, a European version of the Siena, was tested in Russia according to the Euro NCAP latest standard, an offset frontal crash at 64 km/h (40 mph). The Albea scored 8.5 points in the frontal test, equivalent to 3 stars. The tested vehicle was equipped with standard driver airbag and regular seatbelts.

The Fiat Perla, a Chinese version of the Fiat Albea, was tested in China by the China-NCAP in three different tests: a 100% front crash test with a wall (like the US NTHSA test), a 40% offset test (like the Euro NCAP), and a side crash test (like in the Euro NCAP). The Perla scored 8.06 points in the 100% frontal crash test, equivalent to 3 stars, 12.02 points in the 40% offset crash test, equivalent to 4 stars, and 10.96 points in the side crash test, equivalent to 3 stars. The average result was 31 points and 3 stars. The tested vehicle was equipped with standard driver and passenger airbags and regular seatbelts.

== Second generation (326; 2012) ==
Second generation
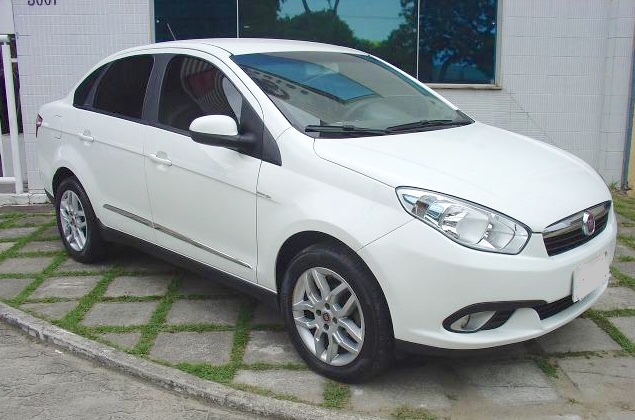

Overview
- Model code: 326
- Also called: Fiat Grand Siena; Dodge Vision (Mexico)
- Production: 2012–2021
- Assembly: Brazil: Betim (Fiat Brazil)

Body and chassis
- Body style: 4-door sedan
- Platform: FCA Economy
- Related: Fiat Palio (326); Fiat Uno (327)

Powertrain
- Engine: 1.0 L FIRE Evo I4 flex fuel 1.4 L FIRE Evo I4 Tetraflex; 1.6 L E.torQ I4 flex fuel
- Transmission: 5-speed manual 5-speed automated manual (Dualogic)

Dimensions
- Wheelbase: 2,510 mm (99 in)
- Length: 4,290 mm (169 in)
- Width: 1,675 mm (65.9 in)
- Height: 1,506 mm (59.3 in)

Chronology
- Successor: Fiat Cronos

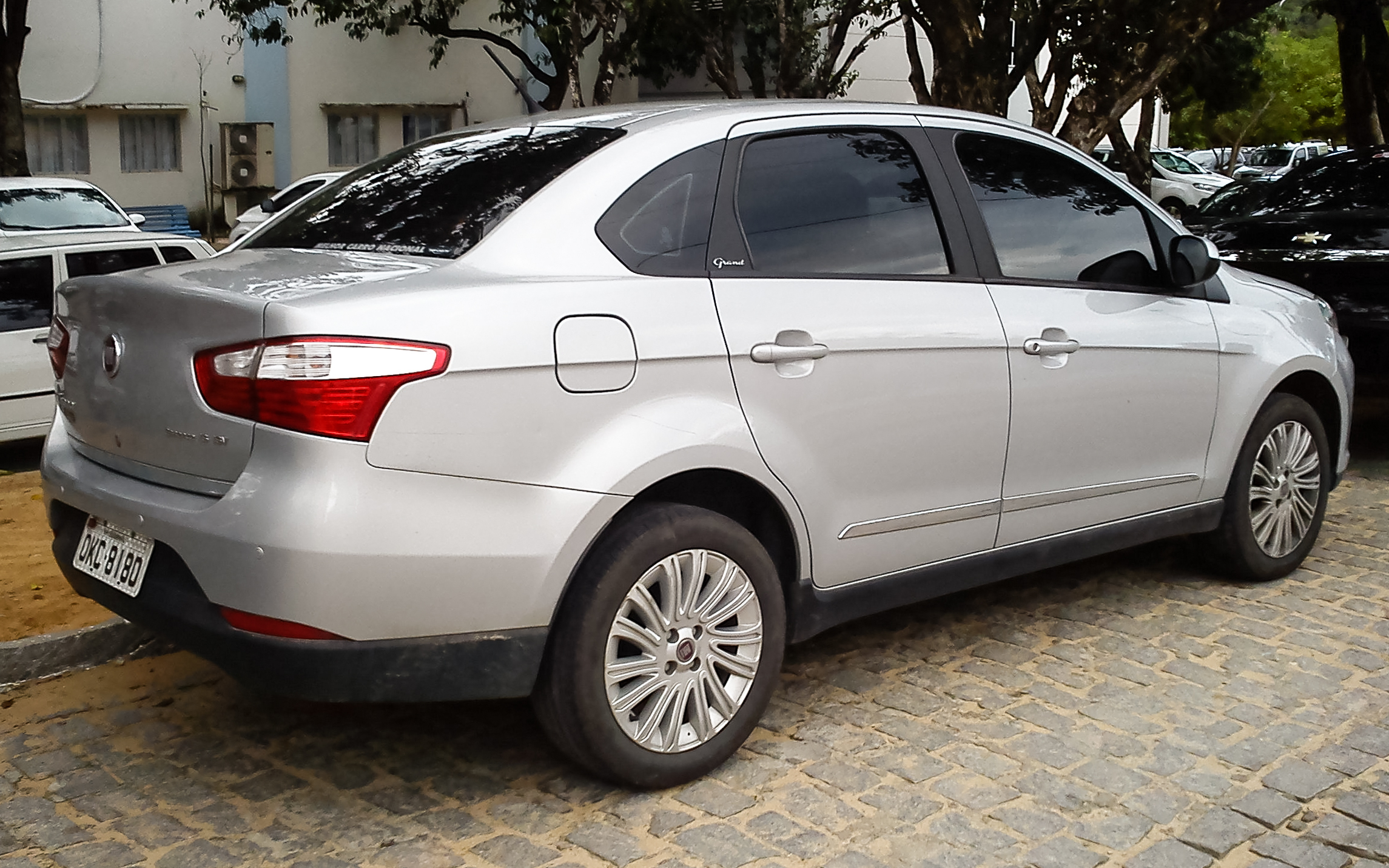
Fiat Grand Siena rear

The second generation of the Fiat Siena (Type 326) was unveiled in South America in 2012, under the Fiat Grand Siena name and from 2015 to 2018 under the Dodge Vision name in Mexico, as the production of the previous generation continues along the new version.

The platform of the new generation is derived from the new Palio, but with a longer wheelbase. The exterior design is different from the new Palio and was inspired by the Fiat Bravo, while the rear design was inspired by Fiat Linea. The interior is the same used in the Palio, with specific details.

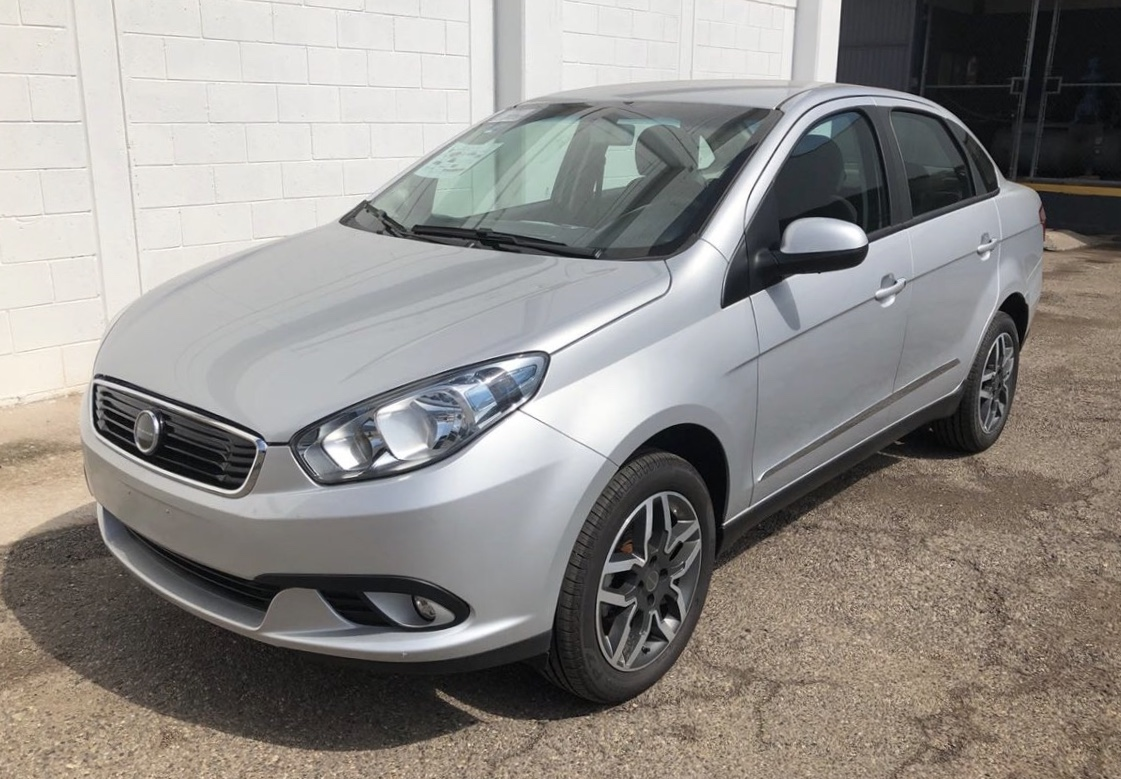
The differences for the rebadged Dodge Vision were minimal

The Grand Siena is larger than its predecessor, but smaller than the Fiat Linea compact car. It is powered by a new Fiat E.torq 1.6-liter flex fuel engine, that delivers around 115 PS (85 kW), or by the smaller 1.4 16V Fire EVO Tetrafuel engine with a maximum power of 85 PS (63 kW). The new model weighs less and has more legroom compared to its predecessor. The front suspension uses the same MacPherson system of the new Palio, but the rear suspension uses a new type of torsion beam.

Production of the Grand Siena started in 2012, at first at the Betim plant in Brazil. The Grand Siena is marketed in South America and Mexico (as the Dodge Vision). In 2018 production of the engine 1.4 Fire Evo flex and 1.6 E.torQ flex end, the only engine available is the 1.0 Fire Evo flex.

The 2017 model received small changes, such as a redesigned grille, new interior colors and the relocation of the USB connector to the center console in the versions with manual transmission.

For the 2020 model, it was only sold in Brazil with some changes: it is offered with two engines, a 1.0 of 75 PS (55 kW) and 1.4 of 88 PS (65 kW), in both cases with a five-speed manual gearbox. Optional for the 1.4 is the prep for the installation of CNG.

The Grand Siena production ended at the end of December 2021 because of Proconve L7 emissions standards.

=== Sales ===
Calendar year	Argentina	Mexico as Dodge Vision
2013	7,225	
2014	5,652	
2015	16,299	2,667
2016	13,882	3,274
2017	11,185	2,483
2018	2,641	1,278
Subtotal	56,884	9,702
Total	66,856	

== See also ==
- Fiat Palio
- Fiat Strada
