= Fiat-Sollers =

Joint venture

- Type: Joint venture
- Industry: Automotive
- Founded: January 2006
- Defunct: February 2011
- Successor: Ford Sollers
- Headquarters: Russia
- Area served: Russia
- Products: Automobiles
- Owners: Fiat S.p.A. Sollers JSC

Fiat-Sollers (Russian: СП «Соллерс-Fiat») was a joint venture between Fiat S.p.A. and Sollers JSC (formerly Severstal Avto). Each company had a 50% share in the venture, and the product range was determined by Fiat.

== Overview ==
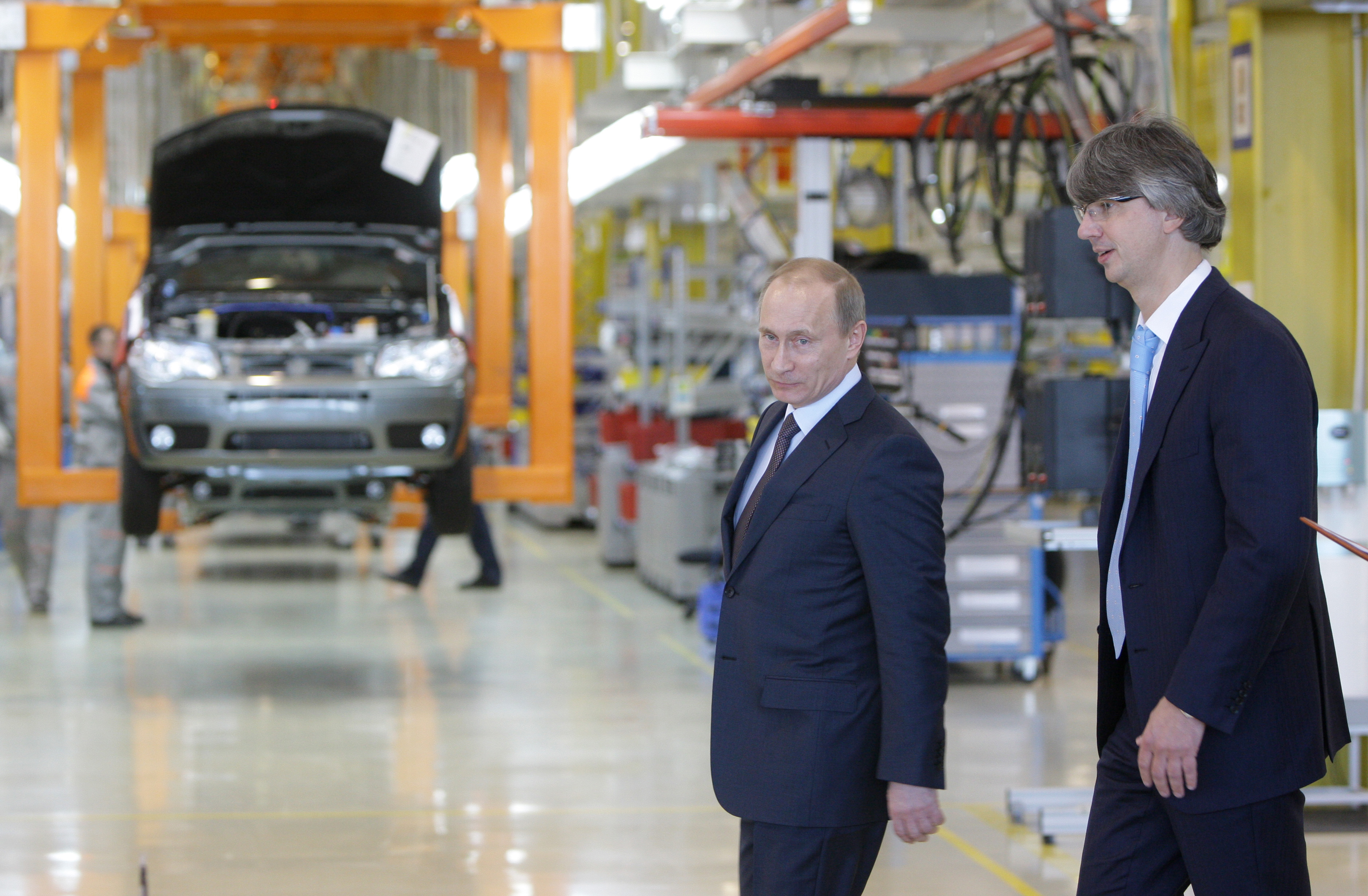
Vladimir Putin visiting the Fiat-Sollers Naberezhnye Chelny plant in 2010

It had its origins in January 2006, when a licensing agreement was first signed between the two companies. As part of the deal, Severstal Avto became the distributor of the full range of Fiat cars and commercial vehicles. Fiat-branded cars from the venture were launched at the Moscow International Automobile Salon of 2006.

Complete knock-down kits of the Fiat Albea sedan and Fiat Doblò van were assembled for the Russian market in Naberezhnye Chelny, in the facilities of the ZMA automotive company. An agreement to manufacture the F1A diesel engine for the Fiat Ducato and the UAZ Patriot in Nizhniy Novgorod was signed in December 2006.

A new factory in Yelabuga was established as part of the joint venture to manufacture the Fiat Linea. The facility was also used to produce the Fiat Ducato. In May 2008 Vladimir Putin drove the first Fiat Ducato to come out of the new factory.

A formal joint venture structure between the companies was set up in February 2010. In February 2011, Sollers decided to terminate their partnership with Fiat at the end of the year, and the Naverezhny Chelny plant was offered to Ford as part of the new Ford Sollers joint venture.

== Production ==
- Fiat Albea
- Fiat Palio
- Fiat Doblò
- Fiat Linea
- Fiat Ducato
