= Sollers JSC =

Russian automotive company

Sollers PJSC
- Native name: ПАО «Соллерс»
- Type: Public joint-stock company
- Traded as: MCX: SVAV
- Industry: Automotive
- Founded: 2002; 24 years ago
- Headquarters: Moscow, Russia
- Key people: Vadim Shvetsov (Chairman)
- Products: Automobiles, commercial vehicles, heavy machinery
- Revenue: $613 million (2017)
- Operating income: $33.8 million (2016)
- Net income: $57.9 million (2023)
- Total assets: $614 million (2016)
- Total equity: $268 million (2016)
- Website: www.sollers-auto.com/en

Sollers PJSC (Russian: ПАО «Соллерс»), formerly known as OJSC Severstal-Auto, is a Russian holding company controlling blocks of shares of Ulyanovsk Automobile Plant (UAZ), Zavolzhye Engine Factory (ZMZ) and Sollers - Naberezhnye Chelny. The enterprises of Severstal-Auto are well-known automobile brands and occupy stable positions in their market segments.

== History ==
Since 2005, SeverstalAvto has been the owner of the ZMA (Russian: ЗМА, Завод малолитражных автомобилей) car factory in Naberezhnye Chelny, Russia. The factory was previously owned in part by KamAZ and was one of the production bases for the Lada Oka minicar. SeverstalAvto is listed in RTS Index.

Production of the Oka was due to be phased out in 2006 after 17 years and replaced by a number of Fiat models such as the Albea and Doblò.

February 11, 2010 an agreement was signed to establish on the basis of the plant "Sollers-Naberezhnye Chelny" joint venture to develop and produce cars between "Sollers" and the Italian company Fiat. It was planned that in the event of the maximum load plant will produce up to 500 thousand cars of different classes in the year. It was expected that the implementation of this project the Government of Russia can provide a loan of 2.1 billion euros. A year later, the parties decided to abandon this project and instead "Sollers" agreed to form a joint venture to produce cars with a Ford - Ford Sollers. It is expected that by the American company in the joint venture will be made to the Russian trading arm of Ford Motor Rus and Vsevolozhsk plant, from the "Sollers" - production capacity. Distribution of shares in the joint venture will be 50 to 50. It is assumed that the company will produce cars under the brand Ford.

In 2012, the joint venture started production car Ford Transit, in 2013 Ford Explorer.

On 1 March 2011, it was announced in Beijing a joint venture, "Sollers-Bussan", between "Sollers" and the Japanese group Mitsui & Co car manufacturing Toyota. Proportion of the parties in the new plant to be distributed at a ratio of 50% to 50%. The spring of 2012 at new sites will begin production of SUVs Toyota Land Cruiser Prado.

On 27 April 2012, Sollers and Mazda signed an agreement to establish a 50:50 joint venture called Mazda-Sollers Manufacturing Rus(MSMR) in Vladivostok. The venture begun operations in the second half of 2012. The plant produces crossover Mazda CX-5, sedan Mazda6, as well as under other brands of cars. The production capacity of 50 thousand vehicles per year, and will be further increased to 70 thousand . annual. In October 2016, Mazda signed an agreement with the Russian government to build engine production in Vladivostok.

In September 2018, MSMR started producing engines at its newly built engine plant. The Russian President Vladimir Putin and the Japanese Prime Minister Shinzo Abe attended at the opening ceremony of the plant.

According to OICA statistics, Sollers produced 57,171 vehicles in 2015.

In 2021, Sollers started to assemble a luxury car for civilian and presidential use at the Ford Sollers plant. Called the Aurus Senat, the 4.4 litre V8 limousine was developed by the Central Scientific Research Automobile and Automotive Engines Institute (NAMI) in Moscow, and comes in two versions, the S600 and L700 (with this latter model intended for state officials).

On 1 March 2022, Ford Motor Company announced that it was suspending its joint venture with Sollers, in response to the 2022 Russian invasion of Ukraine.

Mazda Motor Corporation sold a stake in a joint venture in Vladivostok to Sollers PJSC Auto for 1 euro. The agreement was signed on October 24, 2022.

== Structure ==
- UAZ
- Ford Sollers joint venture
- Sollers-Bussan (Vladivostok) joint venture with Mitsui & Co. producing Toyota vehicles
- Mazda Sollers (Vladivostok) joint venture
- Strategic partnership with SsangYong
- Zavolzhsky Motor Plant
- Sollers - Naberezhnye Chelny (formerly Zavod Malolitrazhnykh Avtomobiley)
- Sollers-Isuzu joint venture, terminated in 2015
- Fiat-Sollers joint venture, terminated in 2012

== Current Production ==
- Aurus Senat
- UAZ-469
- UAZ Patriot

== Former Production ==
- Ford Explorer (2012–2019)
- Ford Transit (2012–2022)
- Isuzu C/E Series (2009–2023)
- Isuzu N-Series (2009–2023)
- Mazda 6 (2012–2022)
- Mazda CX-5 (2012–2022)
- Mazda CX-9 (2016–2022)
- SsangYong Korando (2010–2015)
- SsangYong Kyron (2005–2014)
- SsangYong Rexton (2009–2015)
- Toyota Land Cruiser Prado (2013–2015)
