= Fiat Linea =

Compact car manufactured by Fiat

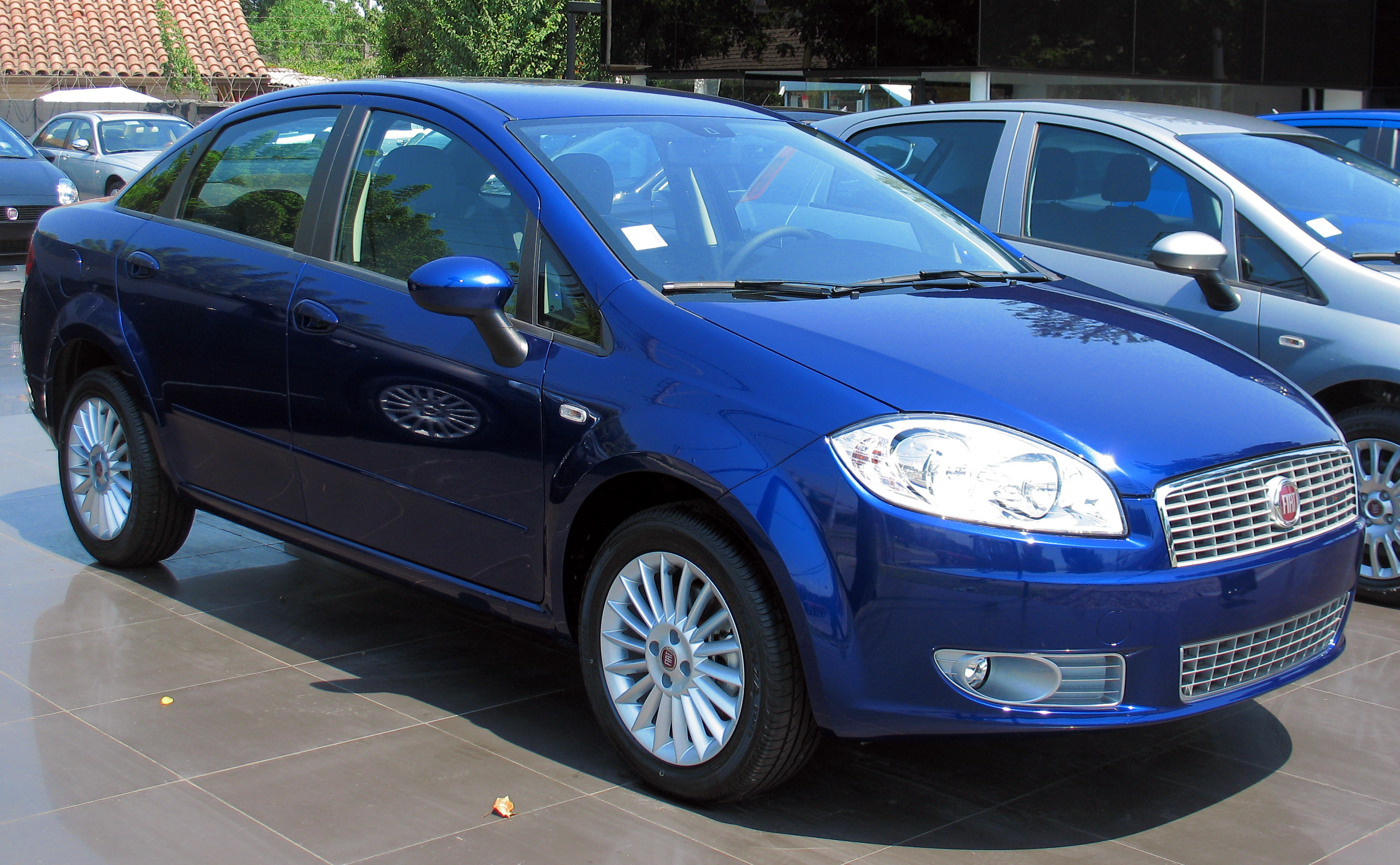

Overview
- Manufacturer: Fiat
- Model code: 323
- Production: November 2006–2018
- Assembly: Turkey: Bursa Province (Tofaş); Brazil: Betim (Fiat Automóveis); India: Ranjangaon, Pune (Fiat India); Russia: Naberezhnye Chelny (Fiat-Sollers)
- Designer: Centro Stile Fiat

Body and chassis
- Class: Small family car (C)
- Body style: 4-door Sedan
- Layout: Front-engine, front-wheel-drive
- Platform: FCA Small LWB
- Related: Fiat Grande Punto

Powertrain
- Engine: 1.4L FIRE I4 (Petrol); 1.4L FIRE T-Jet I4 (Petrol); 1.8L E.torQ I4 (FlexFuel); 1.9L Torque I4 (FlexFuel); 1.3L MultiJet I4 (Diesel); 1.6L MultiJet I4 (Diesel)
- Transmission: 5/6-speed manual 6-speed Dualogic automated manual

Dimensions
- Wheelbase: 2,603 mm (102.5 in)
- Length: 4,560 mm (179.5 in)
- Width: 1,730 mm (68.1 in)
- Height: 1,494 mm (58.8 in)
- Kerb weight: 1,185–1,260 kg (2,612–2,778 lb)

Chronology
- Predecessor: Fiat Marea; Fiat Albea
- Successor: Fiat Tipo/Egea (Europe)

The Fiat Linea (Type 323) is a compact sedan produced by Fiat between 2006 and 2018. The sedan was released on 26 March 2007 at the Tofaş plant in Bursa, Turkey as a "world car" in developing countries. It is based on the Fiat Grande Punto. The Linea was designed by Fiat Style Centre and co-developed by Tofaş (joint venture between the Fiat Group and Koç Holding) and Fiat do Brasil. Production in Turkey ended in 2016.

== History ==
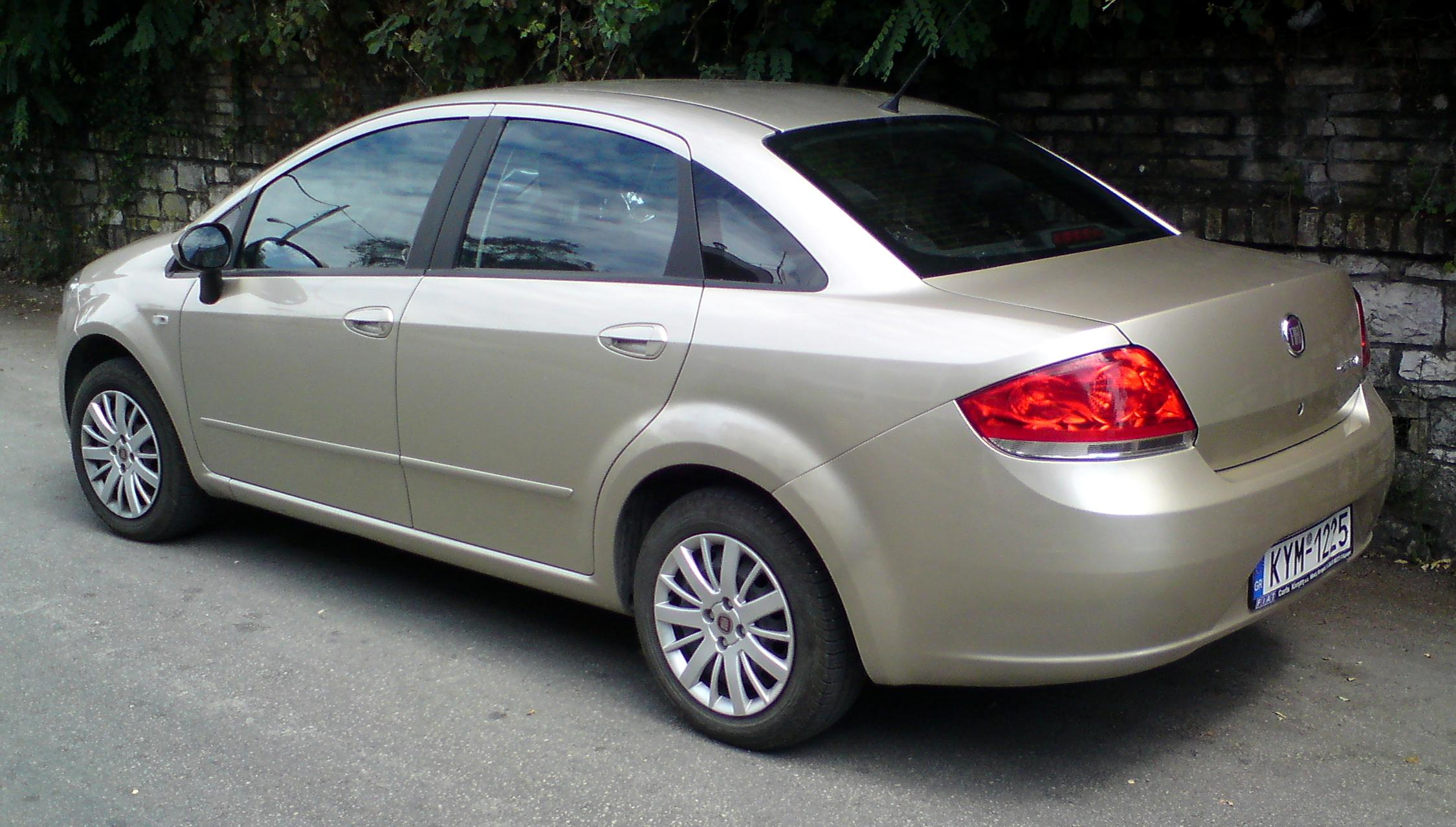
Fiat Linea

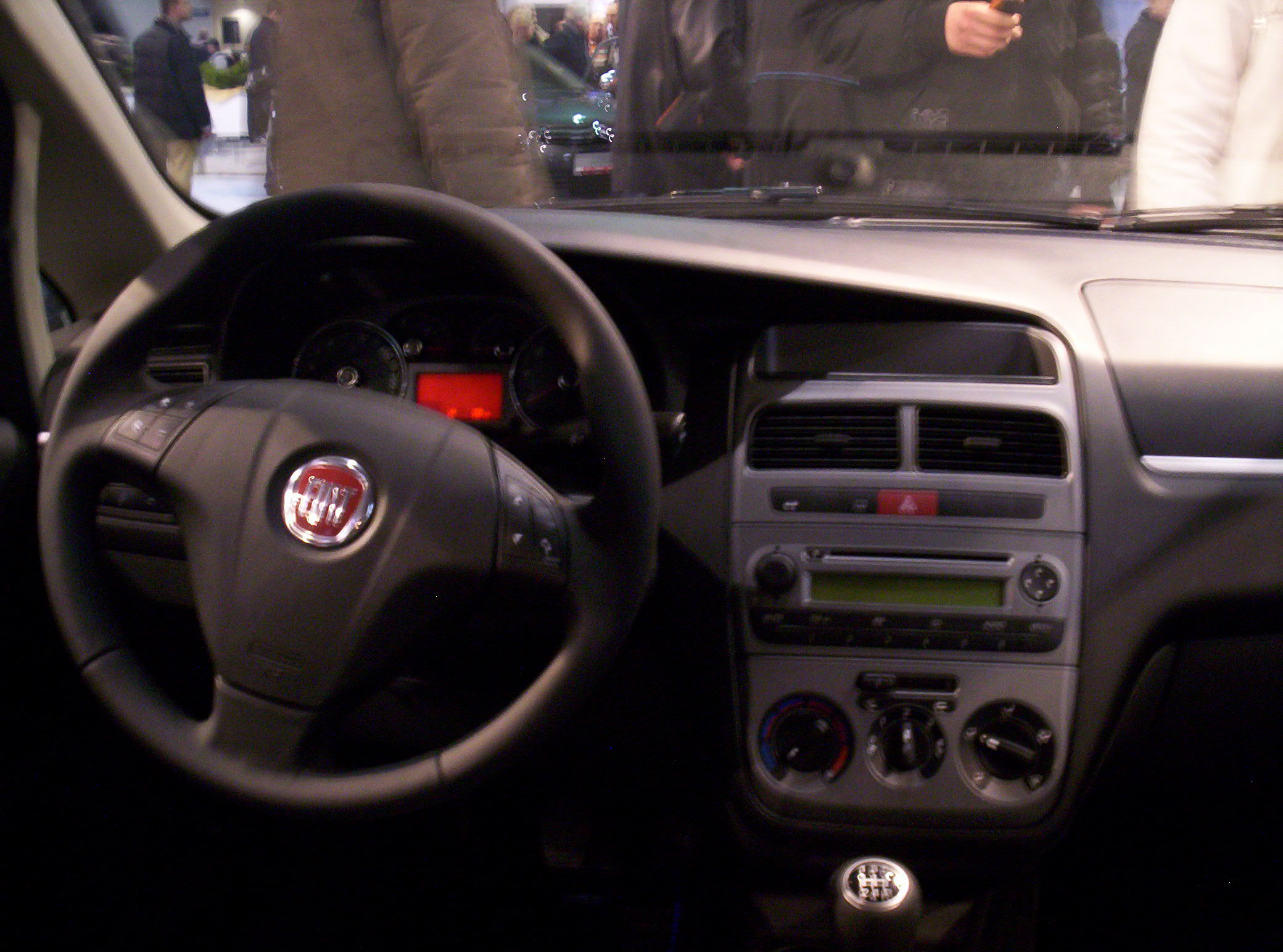
Interior

The Fiat Linea is built on the FCA Small LWB platform. The Linea sits on a 2,603 mm (102.5 in) wheelbase and its total length is 4,560 mm (179.5 in), 100 mm (3.9 in) and 500 mm (19.7 in), respectively, longer than the Fiat Grande Punto it is based on. It is only 111 mm (4.4 in) shorter than the Fiat Viaggio compact sedan from the C-segment.

At launch, in Turkey in 2007, the car was initially available with a 1.4 Fire gasoline engine and 1.3 Multijet diesel engine. The 1.4 TurboJet engine with 120 PS, and the 1.6 diesel with 105 PS were the next models to be made available. Production at the Tofaş plant is mostly aimed at the local Turkish market, whereas CBUs are shipped out for the EU market and CKD components are shipped to the Tatarstan plant of the Fiat-Sollers joint venture in Russia.

Launched in September 2008 in Brazil, the Linea was available there with a 1.9 L 16v "Torque" engine with 132 PS (97 kW; 130 hp), to make it flexible for the Brazilian market (capable of using petrol or ethanol). Also in Brazil the Linea is available with a 1.4 L 16v T-Jet petrol-only engine with 152 PS (112 kW; 150 hp); the same engine used in Fiat Grande Punto Abarth in Europe.

The Fiat Linea was launched in South Africa in September 2009.

Launched in January 2009 in India, the Linea is there available with a 1.4L Fire petrol engine 90 PS (66 kW; 89 hp), and 1.3L Multijet diesel engine of 93 PS (68 kW; 92 hp). In 2009, the Linea contains 65% Indian parts. Another variant of the Fiat Linea, which includes the much acclaimed 1.4L T-JET Engine providing 114 PS (84 kW; 112 hp), was released on 8 October 2010 in India.

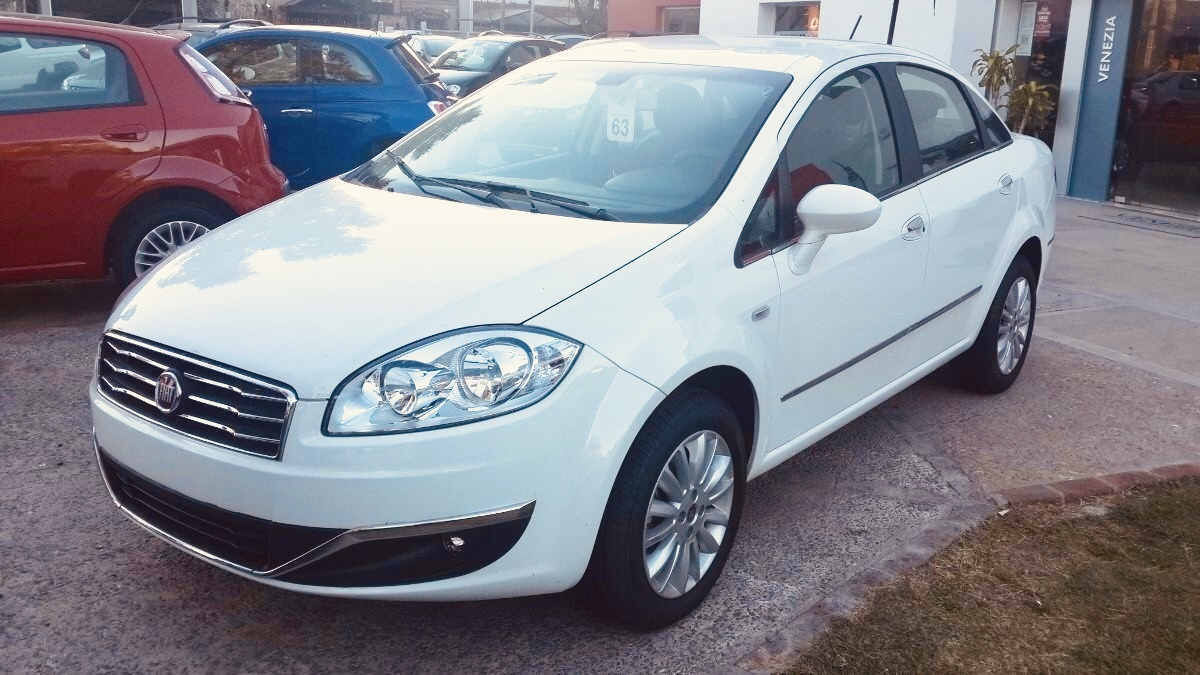
2012 Fiat Linea facelift

In 2010 (2011 model) Fiat replaced the Torque engine (1.9 16v Flex) with a new 1.8 16v E.torQ, derived from the old 1.6 16v SOHC Tritec engines used in the Mini Cooper and Chrysler PT Cruiser. Fiat Powertrain Technologies changed the displacement from 1598 cc to 1747 cc and made it a flex fuel engine (ethanol/petrol). Max power output was the same (compared with old Torque engine), but it would be reached earlier, and torque has increased from 183 N⋅m (135 lb⋅ft) to 185 N⋅m (136 lb⋅ft). Car performance did not change significantly; using only E-Torq engines in Latin America was largely a strategic decision for Fiat.

Fiat Linea runs in a different segment and has different competition in Brazil and India. It is positioned in the upper B segment and goes against cars like the Honda City, Toyota Yaris sedan, Citroen C-Elysee, Ford Fiesta, Hyundai Accent/Verna. This positioning has been done to gain a foothold in the Indian market and to achieve the reduced price several features such as the TS and ESC (which are optional).

== Car systems ==
The Linea is equipped with the Blue&Me hands-free system, a Microsoft Windows Mobile-based system with multi-language voice recognition and speech functions. The system allows one to browse the mobile's phonebook, read SMSs aloud and display them on the MID, and controls the audio system. A USB stick with music files on it can be plugged into the built-in USB port and music can be played via Blue&Me's built-in Microsoft Windows Media Player.

In Brazil, the Linea can be equipped, optionally, with a Blue&Me Nav system; an enhanced Blue&Me system that has a GPS system integrated. This GPS system doesn't utilise a touch screen to show maps, instead it uses a regular display that gives directions by voice guidance and displays directional arrows for navigation. The destination address, as well as other instructions, can be entered by voice, just like the regular Blue&Me system, or by using the controls on the steering wheel. The Linea is the first car in Brazil that has an integrated GPS system.

== Engines ==
Model	Engine	Displacement	Power	Torque	Acceleration (0-100 km/h, 0-62 mph) (Seconds)	Top speed
1.4L – 8V (SOHC)	I4	1368 cc	77 PS (57 kW; 76 hp) at 6000 rpm	115 N⋅m (85 lb⋅ft) at 3000 rpm	14.6	165 km/h (103 mph)
1.4L – 16V (DOHC)	I4	1368 cc	90 PS (66 kW; 89 hp) at 6000 rpm	115 N⋅m (85 lb⋅ft) at 4500 rpm	13.6	182 km/h (113 mph)
1.3L MultiJet 16V (Diesel)	I4	1248 cc	90 PS (66 kW; 89 hp) at 4000 rpm	200 N⋅m (148 lb⋅ft) at 1750 rpm	13.8	170 km/h (106 mph)
1.6L MultiJet 16V (Diesel)	I4	1598 cc	105 PS (77 kW; 104 hp) at 4000 rpm	290 N⋅m (214 lb⋅ft) at 1500 rpm	11.0	190 km/h (118 mph)
1.4L 16V TurboJet (T-Jet)	I4	1368 cc	120 PS (88 kW; 118 hp) at 5000 rpm	206 N⋅m (152 lb⋅ft) at 1750 rpm	9.0	195 km/h (121 mph)
1.4L 16V TurboJet (T-Jet)	I4	1368 cc	152 PS (112 kW; 150 hp) at 5500 rpm	207 N⋅m (153 lb⋅ft) at 2250 rpm	8.5	203 km/h (126 mph)
1.9L 16V Torque (FlexFuel)	I4	1839 cc	132 PS (97 kW; 130 hp) at 5750 rpm	183 N⋅m (135 lb⋅ft) at 4500 rpm	10.5	188 km/h (117 mph)
1.8L 16V E.torQ (FlexFuel)	I4	1747 cc	132 PS (97 kW; 130 hp) at 5250 rpm	185 N⋅m (136 lb⋅ft) at 4500 rpm	9.9	192 km/h (119 mph)

== Fiat Linea in India ==
Presently, the four different variants of Fiat Linea available are: Active, Dynamic, Emotion and Emotion Pack. A Linea Dynamic pack was also available earlier but has been discontinued since April 2010. All these variants are available with both petrol (1.4L FIRE) and diesel (1.3L MultiJet) engine options. These versions are decided on the basis of price to content ratio in these vehicles. Some standard features of the Linea include: automatic climate control, Blue&Me with steering mounted controls, speed sensitive front wipers and volume control, dual rear AC vents, and Advanced Driver information System (DIS).

The Linea marked the comeback of Fiat in the Indian market and has now come up with Fiat Linea T Jet. The Linea T Jet is equipped with a 1.4L turbocharged petrol engine that produces 114 PS (84 kW; 112 hp) at 5,000 rpm and 207 N⋅m (153 lb⋅ft) of torque at 2,200 rpm. It can accelerate from 0–100 km/h (62 mph) in 10.2 seconds and reach a top speed of 200 km/h (124 mph).

Some additional features of the Linea T-Jet (Indian version) include: 16-inch alloy wheels with 205/55 R16 tires having disc brakes on all four wheels, Italian leather seats, increased ground clearance of 185 mm (7.3 in), best in class better than any other saloon of the segment, improved quality of interiors.

Fiat Linea models

Fiat Linea Active	It is the base variant that comes with most of the safety, comfort and convenience features like rear AC vents, all four power windows with Auto up/down feature, theater dimming front cockpit lights with spotlight function, hydraulic power steering, speed sensitive front wipers and AC adjusted for tropical climate but lacks two important features—ABS and dual airbags as they are not mandatory in India.
Fiat Linea Dynamic	It comes with a few more features like driver-seat height adjust, electrically adjustable outside rear-view mirror (ORVMs), Programmable Speed Limit Warning System, additional rear cabin lights, front fog lamps, night panel in roof lights, rear roof light, and foldable desmodronic remote key.
Fiat Linea Emotion	The additional features that this variant offers are: automatic climate control with dual Rear AC Vents, 15-inch alloys, ABS with EBD CD player with 6 speakers, front seat arm rest with glove box, double folding rear back seat, collapsible rear sun curtain, sunglasses holder, leather-wrapped steering wheel and gear knob, electric boot opening from the remote on the foldable key, and front-seat back pockets.
Fiat Linea Emotion Pack	It is the top-end variant of the Fiat Linea which offers a few additional features in comparison to its lower variants. These features are: Blue&Me system with Windows Media player and voice interaction and commands, dual front airbags, front seat belts pre-tensioners & load limiter, steering mounted audio, Blue&Me controls and vanity mirrors on both sides.

In 2012 only three variants were available; Emotion, Dynamic and Active for diesel variant, Active and Dynamic for 1.4 F.I.R.E. engine, and T-Jet & T-Jet + version for Petrol.

== L'Unico Club ==
In Brazil, Fiat aimed the Linea to compete with Japanese cars, such as Honda Civic and Toyota Corolla, the market leaders for its class. As such, Fiat launched the L'Unico Club, that offered VIP services for Linea owners, such as special exclusive lines and exclusive attendants for Linea owners, invitations for special events (concerts, theatre performances, exhibitions, etc.), collect-and-deliver service for maintenance and three years' warranty, the longest warranty for Fiat cars in Brazil.

== Fiat First ==
In India, the Linea along with the Grande Punto are part of the special service from Fiat, namely Fiat First, launched on 15 October 2009 to provide 24×7 Roadside Assistance for punctures, common spares, accident repairs and towing. Fiat provides free 24×7 Roadside Assistance package for 50 months with 2+2 years' extended warranty to all Fiat customers. This service is exclusive to Fiat India only. Fiat boasts of an extensive and growing sales network in India with its partnership with TATA Motors. Tata-Fiat showrooms have on display cars from both manufacturers. The car is manufactured at Fiat's state of the art Ranjangaon facility in Pune, Maharashtra. In mid-2011 Fiat and Tata decided to diverge on the marketing front, with Fiat opting to set up exclusive showrooms for its cars—the Fiat Grande Punto 2012 and the Fiat Linea 2012—released on 3 January 2012. The showrooms will be set up in around 20 major metro cities like Chennai, Bengaluru, Mumbai and New Delhi by late 2012 or early 2013.

== Global sales ==
Calendar year	Brazil	Argentina	Europe	Spain	India	Turkey	México
2017	21				473	8,436	
2016	1,449				1,163	7,298	
2015	4,379		13		1,857	34,725	
2014	6,749		220		3,017	32,249	
2013	7,531		634		2,371	37,752	
2012	8,332		1,261		2,586	33,189	311
2011	12,258		1,750	425	5,477	34,484	380
2010	12,082	2,079	2,999	671	9,589	15,989	10
2009	14,659	1,499	2,453	1,023	12,429	9,970	
2008	2,604		8,363	1,848		8,278	
2007			4,337	1,096		10,301	
Total sales	57,982	3,578	22,030	5,063	38,962	203,228	701
Total sales Global	379,724						

== See also ==
- Fiat Grande Punto
