= Fiat Albea =

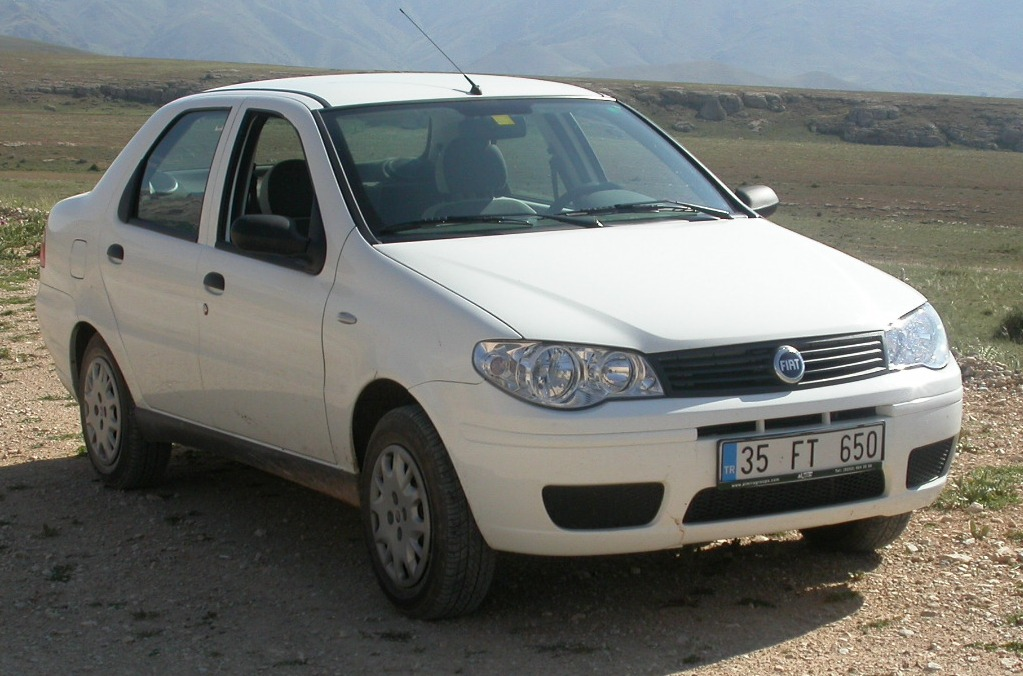
- 2005 Fiat Albea (post-facelift)

Overview
- Manufacturer: Fiat
- Also called: Fiat Siena (China)
- Production: 2002–2012 (Turkey); 2002–2006 (China); 2006–2011 (Russia); 2011–2014 (China: Zotye Auto)
- Assembly: Turkey: Bursa (Tofaş); Russia: Naberezhnye Chelny (Fiat-Sollers); China: Nanjing (Nanjing Fiat)
- Designer: Giorgetto Giugiaro at Italdesign

Body and chassis
- Class: Subcompact car/Supermini (B)
- Body style: 4-door sedan
- Layout: Front-engine, front-wheel-drive
- Related: Fiat Palio; Fiat Siena; Fiat Strada; Fiat Perla; Zotye Z200

Powertrain
- Engine: 1.2 L Fire I4 (petrol); 1.4 L Fire I4 (petrol); 1.6 L Torque I4 (petrol); 1.3 L MultiJet I4 (diesel)
- Transmission: 5-speed manual 5-speed CVT (Speedgear)

Dimensions
- Wheelbase: 2,439 mm (96.0 in)
- Length: 4,210 mm (165.7 in) (2002–2005); 4,186 mm (164.8 in) (2005–2012)
- Width: 1,703 mm (67.0 in)
- Height: 1,489 mm (58.6 in)
- Curb weight: 1,045 kg (2,304 lb)

Chronology
- Predecessor: Fiat Siena
- Successor: Fiat Linea

The Fiat Albea is a subcompact car produced by the Italian manufacturer Fiat between 2002 and 2012, at the Tofaş facilities in Turkey. It is the European version of the global Fiat Siena, the sedan car derived from the hatch compact Fiat Palio. It is a low cost sedan, aimed at developing global markets, and was not sold in Western Europe.

It was also produced in China, where it retained the Fiat Siena nameplate and had two derived versions, the Fiat Perla and currently the Zotye Z200.

== Production ==
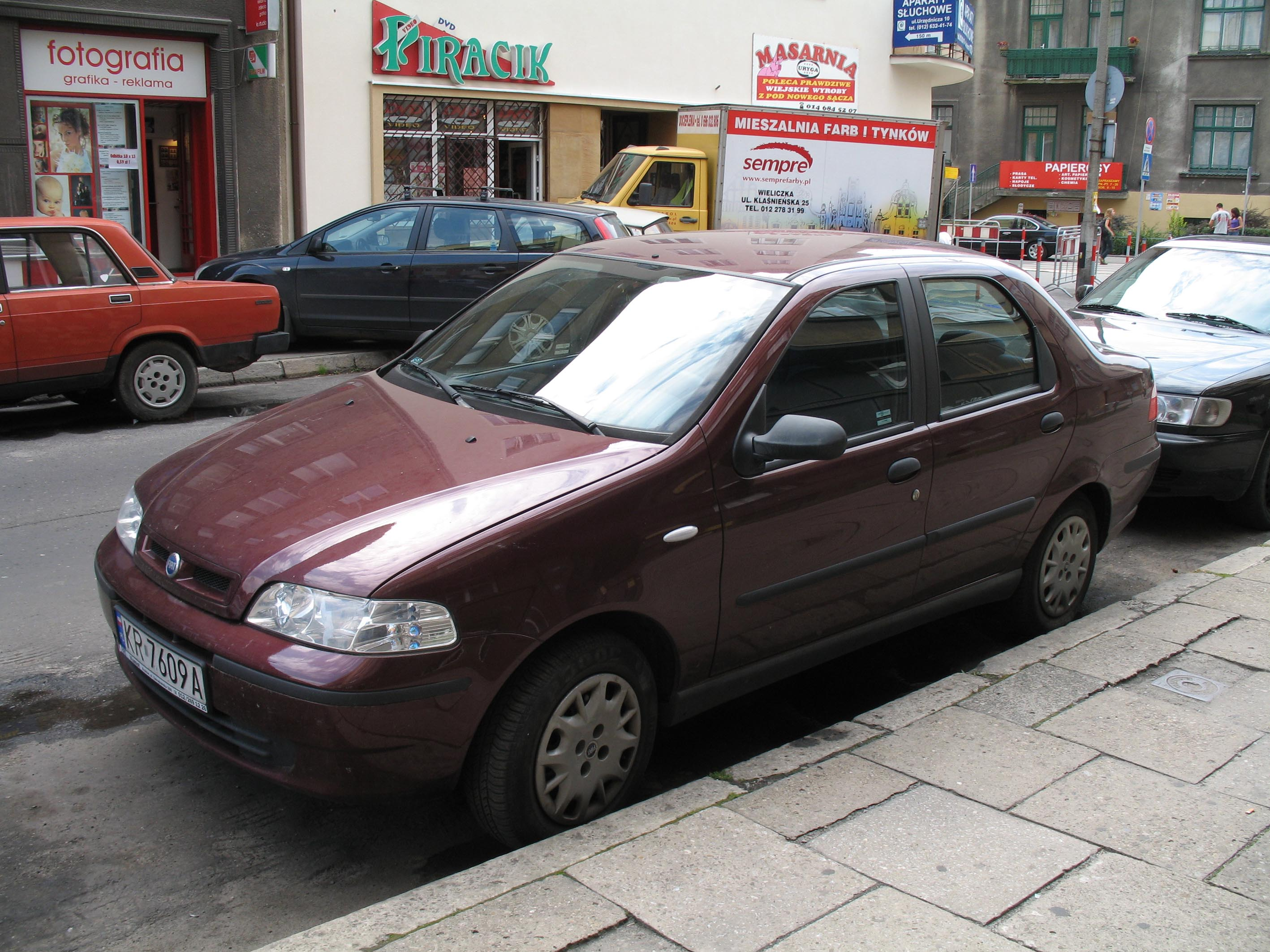
2002 Fiat Albea (pre-facelift)

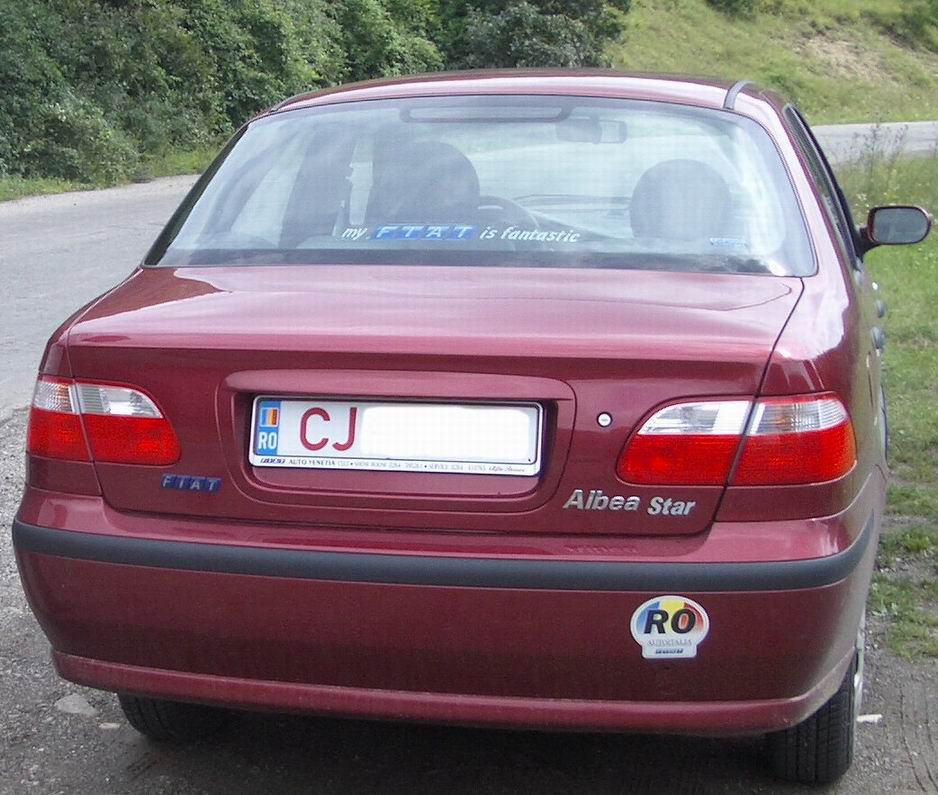
2002–2005 Fiat Albea

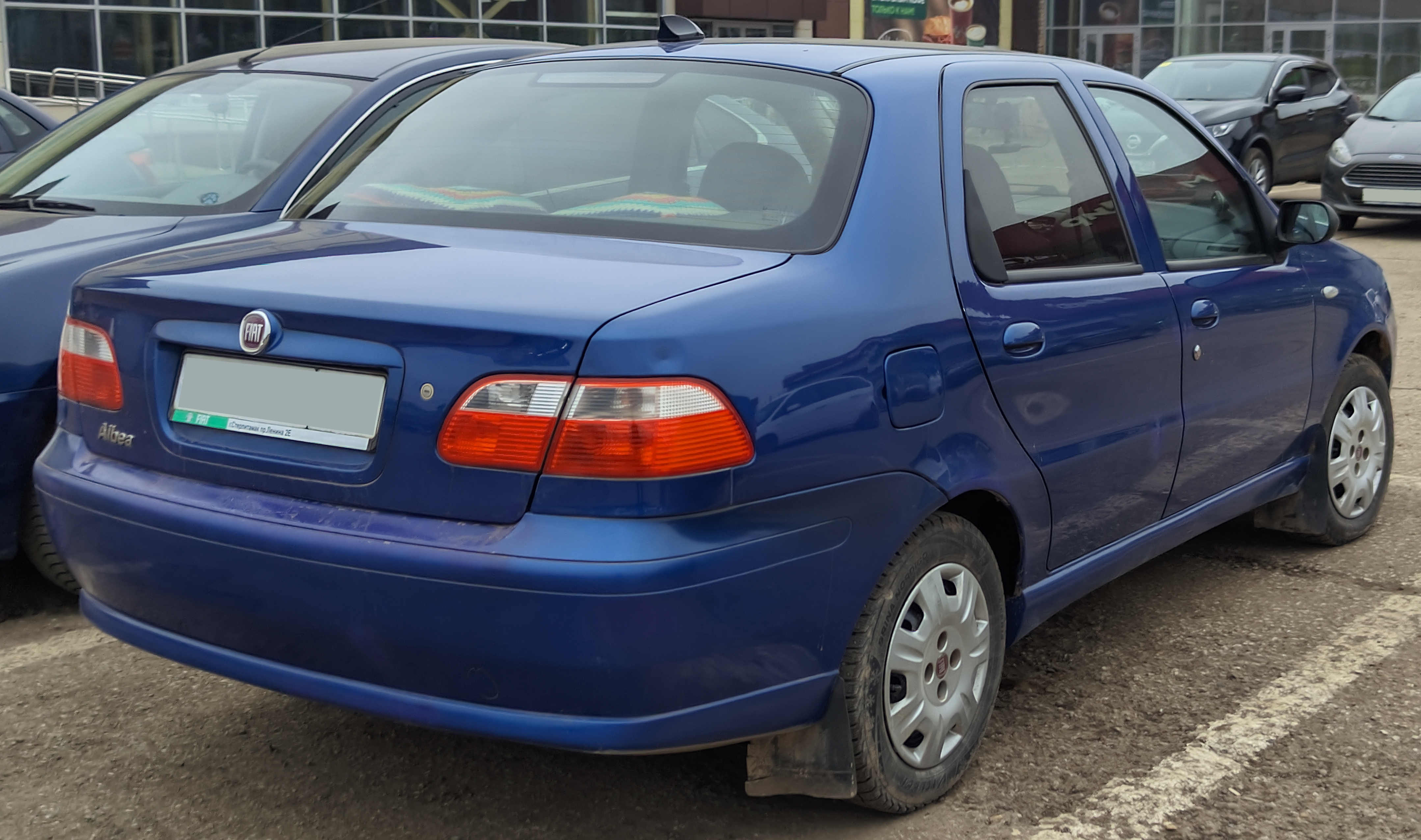
2012 Fiat Albea (facelift, rear view)

The Albea was designed by the Italian designer Giorgetto Giugiaro. It has a similar design with its South American equivalent, the Siena, but with a longer wheelbase. The extension is visible in a somewhat extended segment between the trailing edge of the rear doors and the rear wheelhouse.

A facelifted version has been available since February 2005, two months before the Palio underwent a similar restyling. This version has a new front end, no bumper moldings, and a round "Fiat" badge in the top center of the trunklid.

From 2006 to 2011, the Albea was assembled from complete knock down kits in Russia, in Naberezhnye Chelny, at the Fiat-Sollers plant. The car was available in Russia with 1.4-liter petrol engine only.

Production in Turkey ended in 2012, ending altogether production of the European version of the Palio.

== Engines ==
Engine	Type	Displacement	Power	Torque
1.2 8V SOHC	I4	1,242 cc	60 PS (44 kW; 59 hp) at 5,000 rpm	102 N⋅m (75 lb⋅ft) at 2,500 rpm
1.2 16V DOHC	I4	1,242 cc	80 PS (59 kW; 79 hp) at 5,000 rpm	114 N⋅m (84 lb⋅ft) at 4,000 rpm
1.4 8V SOHC	I4	1,368 cc	77 PS (57 kW; 76 hp) at 6,000 rpm	115 N⋅m (85 lb⋅ft) at 3,000 rpm
1.6 16V DOHC	I4	1,596 cc	103 PS (76 kW; 102 hp) at 5,750 rpm	145 N⋅m (107 lb⋅ft) at 4,000 rpm
1.3 16V MultiJet	I4	1,248 cc	70 PS (51 kW; 69 hp) at 4,000 rpm	180 N⋅m (130 lb⋅ft) at 1,500 rpm

== Safety rating ==
The Albea was tested by ARCAP, according to the Euro NCAP latest regulations. It scored 8.5 points in the frontal crash test, equivalent to three stars in the Euro NCAP testings. The tested vehicle was equipped with standard driver airbag and regular seatbelts.

The Fiat Perla, a Chinese version of the Albea, was tested in China by the China-NCAP in three different tests: a 100% front crash test with a wall (similar to the US NTHSA test), a 40% offset test (similar to the Euro NCAP test) and a side crash test similar to the Euro NCAP.

The Perla scored 8.06 points in the 100% frontal crash test, equivalent to three stars, 12.02 points in the 40% offset crash test, equivalent to four stars, and 10,96 points in the side crash test, equivalent to three stars, with an average result of 31 points and three stars. The tested vehicle was equipped with standard driver and passenger airbag and regular seatbelts.

== Nameplate use ==
In Mexico, the 2009 model of the Fiat Siena has been marketed as the Fiat Albea, replacing the Palio Sedán nameplate used on the previous series of the car.
