= Ford Sollers =

Joint venture

Ford Sollers Holding LLC
- Native name: «Форд Соллерс Холдинг» ООО
- Company type: Private joint venture
- Industry: Automotive
- Founded: 1 October 2011; 14 years ago
- Defunct: October 2022
- Headquarters: Khimki, Moscow Oblast, Russia
- Key people: Adil Shirinov, CEO
- Revenue: $1.15 billion (2017)
- Operating income: −$279 million (2017)
- Net income: −$234 million (2017)
- Total assets: $847 million (2017)
- Total equity: −$563 million (2017)
- Owners: Ford Motor Company; Sollers JSC

Ford Sollers was a joint venture between the American car manufacturer Ford and the Russian Sollers established in 2011, and dissolved in 2022. Ford Sollers was responsible for the production, import, and distribution of all Ford brand products, including vehicles, parts and accessories, in Russia.

== History ==
On 1 October 2011, the CEO of Ford Alan Mulally and Sollers' general director Vadim Shvetsov announced the creation of an equally owned joint venture called Ford Sollers to produce Ford-branded cars. The new company took control of the Ford's factory in Vsevolozhsk, near Saint Petersburg, (opened in 2002) and two Sollers' factories in Tatarstan region, one in Yelabuga and the other in Naberezhnye Chelny. The head offices/product development centre were established in Khimki, Moscow.

Ford had already been producing the Mondeo and Focus car lines in Vsevolozhsk, then the first model produced by the venture in Yelabuga was the Ford Transit. Later, at the same location, started the production of the Kuga, and the Explorer. For the Naberezhny Chelny plant, the Ecosport began in 2014, and the Fiesta began in 2015.

In September 2015, Ford Sollers launched at Yelabuga the first engine plant of a foreign brand in Russia. The plant produces three versions of the 1.6L Duratec engine with 85 hp, 105 hp and 125 hp.

Since 2015, Ford Sollers has been realizing social program Driving Skills for Life Academy aimed at teaching safe driving techniques to young drivers.

On 27 March 2019, Ford announced it was restructuring its agreement with Sollers and it will discontinue its passenger vehicle portfolio in Russia to help deliver a more competitive and sustainably profitable business going forward.

On 1 March 2022, Ford Sollers suspended operations in response to the Russian invasion of Ukraine. On 26 October 2022, Ford sold its 49 percent share in the joint venture, and exited the Russian market, adding that it retains the option to buy them back within a 5-year period “should the global situation change.

== Production ==
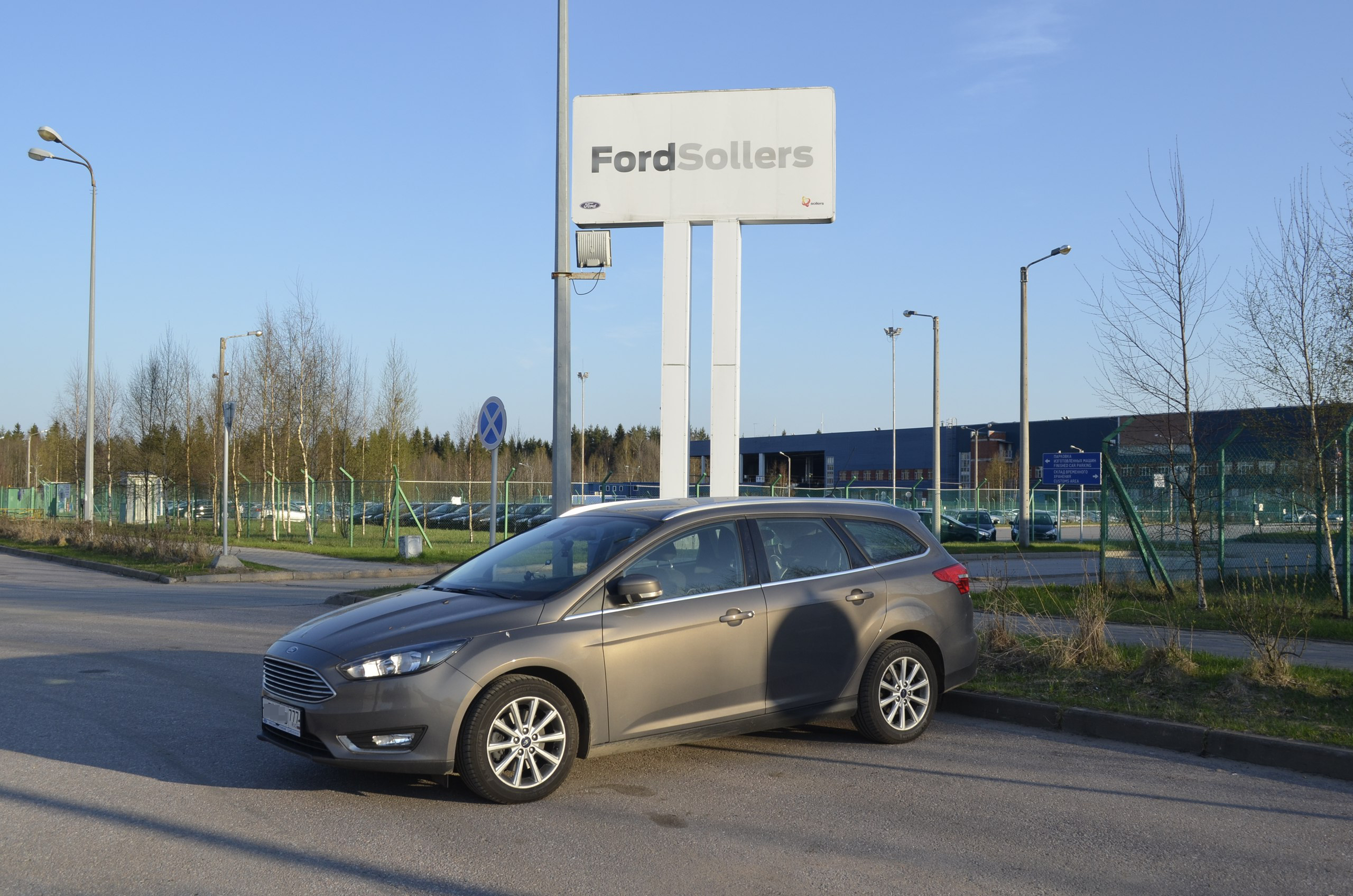
Ford Focus Mk3 facelift in front of the Vsevolozhsk Factory

=== Vsevolozhsk (Saint Petersburg) ===
- Ford Focus (2004–2019)
- Ford Mondeo (2009–2014)

=== Yelabuga ===
- Ford Transit (2012–2022)
- Ford Kuga (2013–2019)
- Ford Explorer (2012–2019)
- Ford Galaxy (2012–2014)
- Ford S-Max (2012–2014)
- Aurus Senat

=== Naberezhny Chelny ===
- Ford EcoSport (2014–2019)
- Ford Fiesta (2015–2019)
