= List of Stellantis platforms =

STLA platform

Overview
- Manufacturer: Stellantis
- Also called: STLA Small; STLA Medium; STLA Large; STLA Frame; STLA One
- Production: 2023–present

Body and chassis
- Layout: Rear-engine, rear-wheel-drive Front-motor, front-wheel drive Dual-motor, all-wheel drive

Chronology
- Predecessor: A-segment: Fiat Mini platform B-segment: PSA EMP1 platform SCCS platform C/D-segment: PSA EMP2 platform Fiat Compact platform Small Wide platform D/E/F-segment: FCA Giorgio platform Chrysler LC/LD/LA platform Maserati M156 platform Body-on-frame: Wrangler JL platform Ram DT platform

This is a list of car platforms created by the multinational automotive manufacturing corporation Stellantis.

== Pre-existing platforms ==
The following platforms were inherited in 2021 when the Stellantis corporation was created:

=== Chrysler ===
- Chrysler LA and LD platform
- Wrangler JL platform
- Ram DT platform
- Chrysler RU platform
- Jeep WS platform
- Jeep WL platform
- Chrysler KL platform

=== Fiat ===
- Fiat Mini platform
- Fiat Small platform
- Fiat Compact platform
- FCA Giorgio platform
- Maserati M156 platform

=== PSA ===
- PSA EMP1 platform
- PSA EMP2 platform

== Electric vehicle platforms ==
In 2021 Stellantis announced plans to create new shared platforms as part of their electric vehicle (EV) strategy. The group plans to have 39 electrified vehicle models available by the end of 2021. There are four EV platforms with configurable drivetrains planned to be developed by the end of the 2020s:

- STLA Small, for B/C-segment vehicles
  - with sub-variant Smart Car Platform for the new generation of more efficient electric vehicles
- STLA Medium, for C/D-segments
  - Peugeot e-3008 III (e-P64, 2024–present)
  - Peugeot e-5008 III (e-P67, 2024–present)
  - Opel Grandland II (2024–present)
  - Citroën C5 Aircross II (CR3, 2025–present)
  - Jeep Compass III (J4U, 2025–present) (Europe)
  - DS N°8 (D85, 2025–present)
  - DS N°7 (2026, upcoming)
  - Lancia Gamma (2026, upcoming)
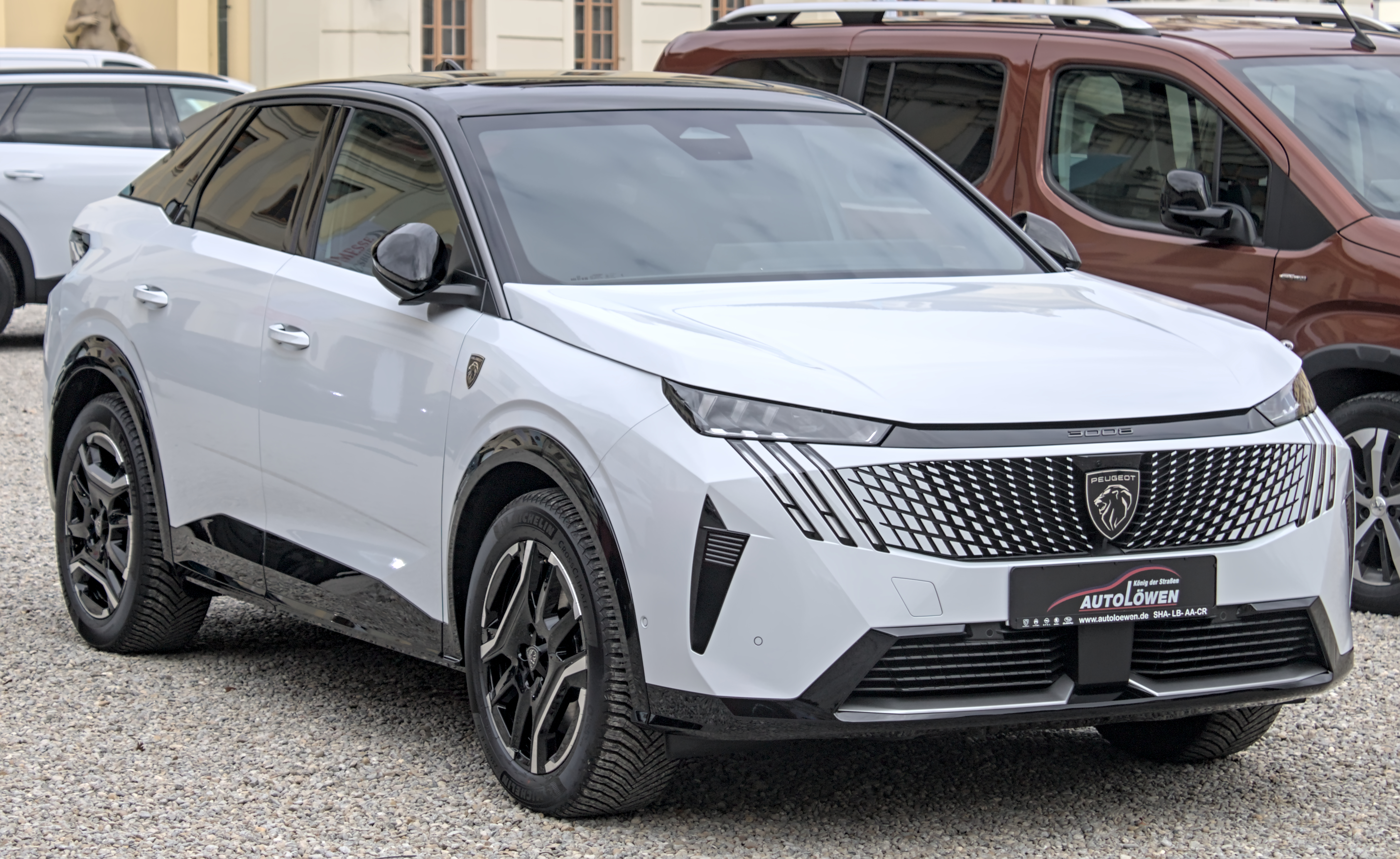
Peugeot e-3008 III

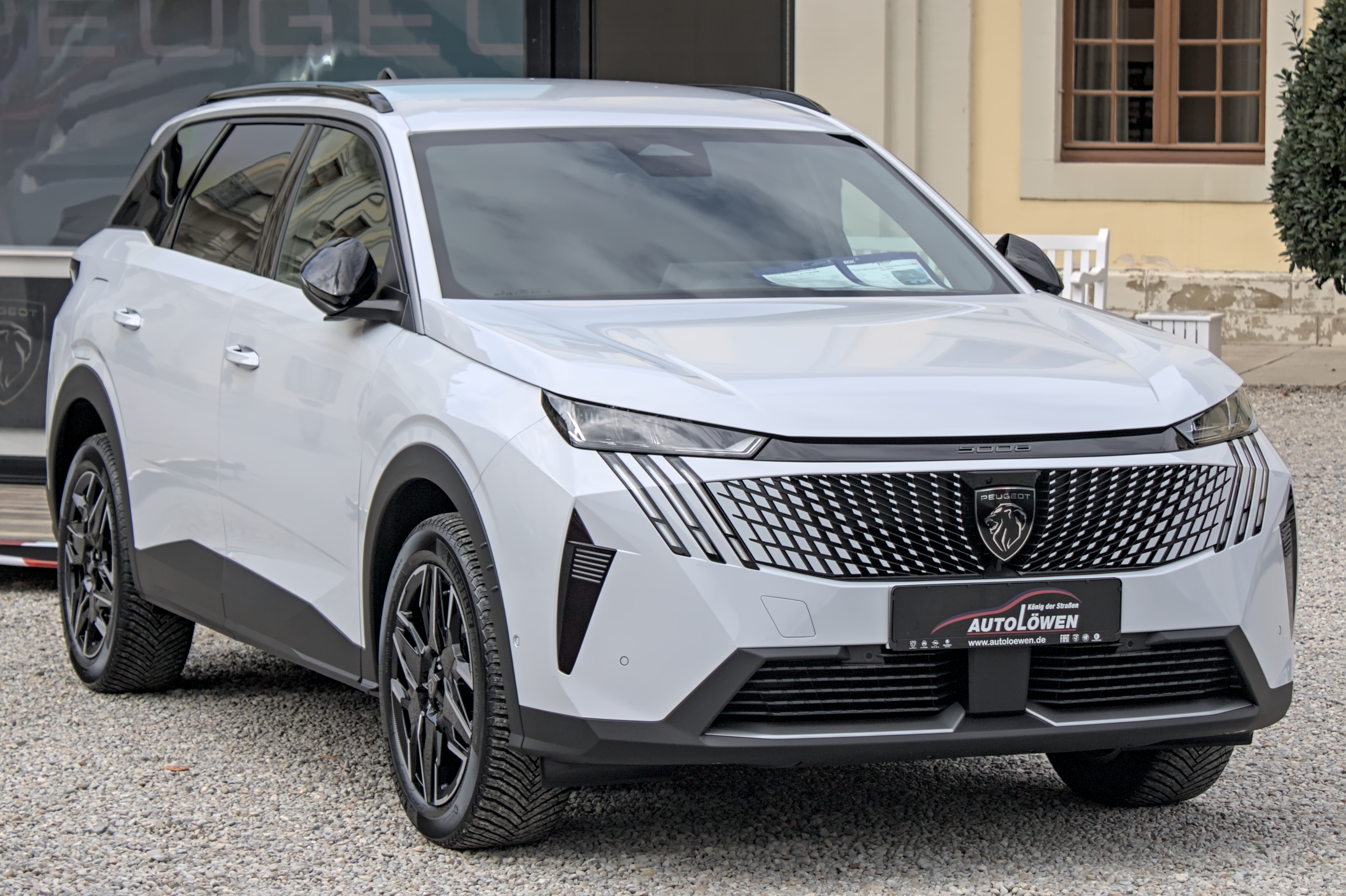
Peugeot e-5008 III

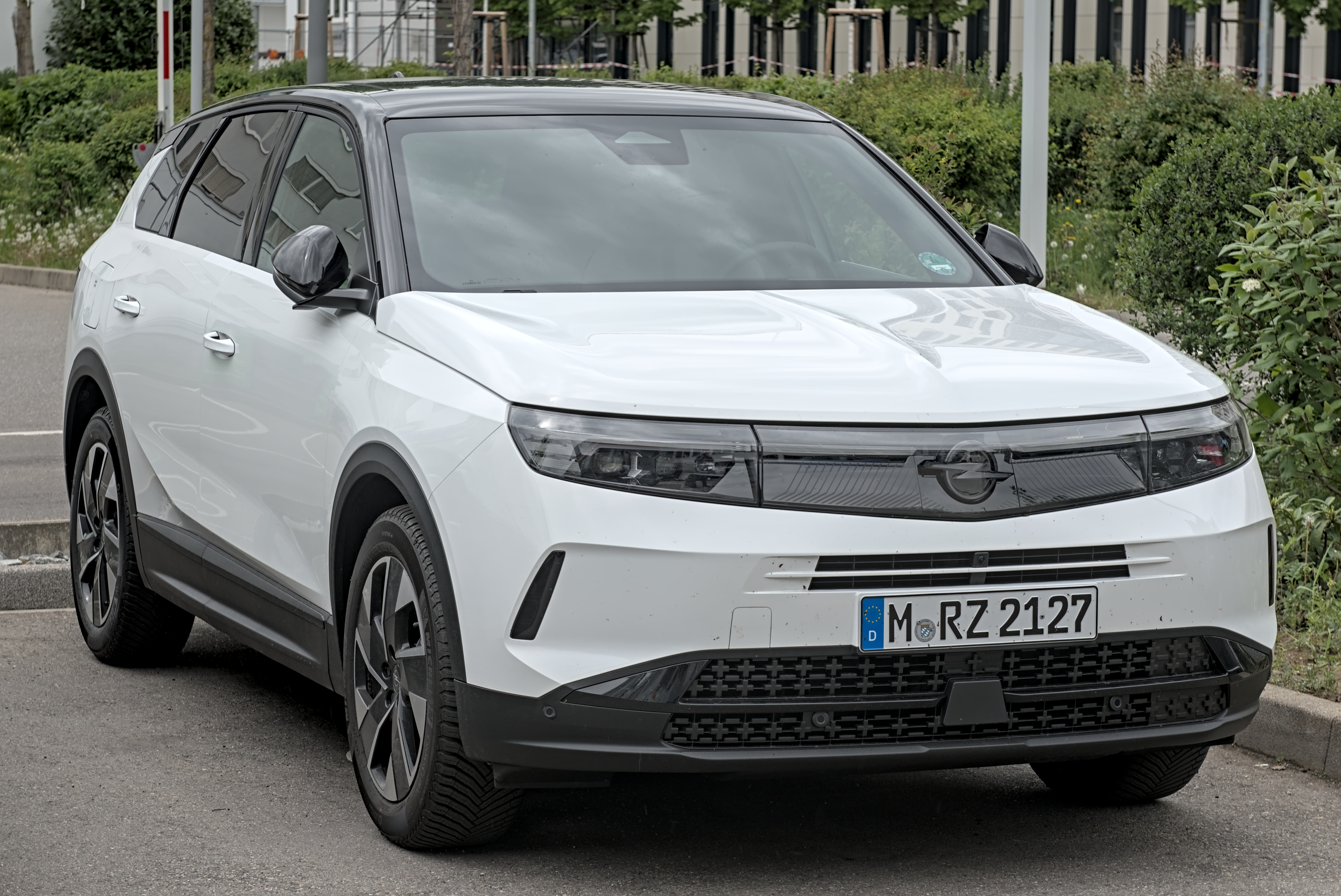
Opel Grandland II

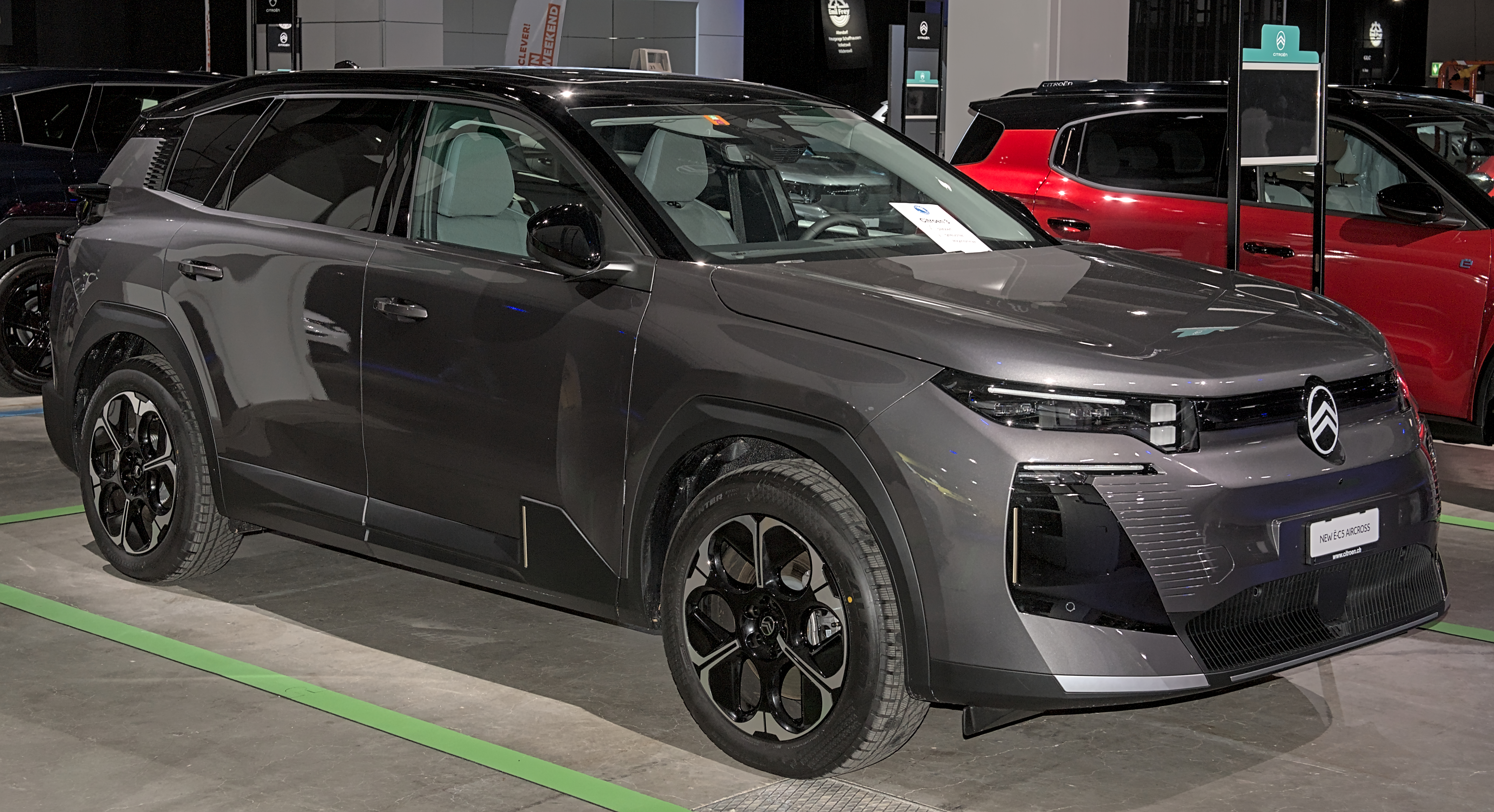
Citroën C5 Aircross II

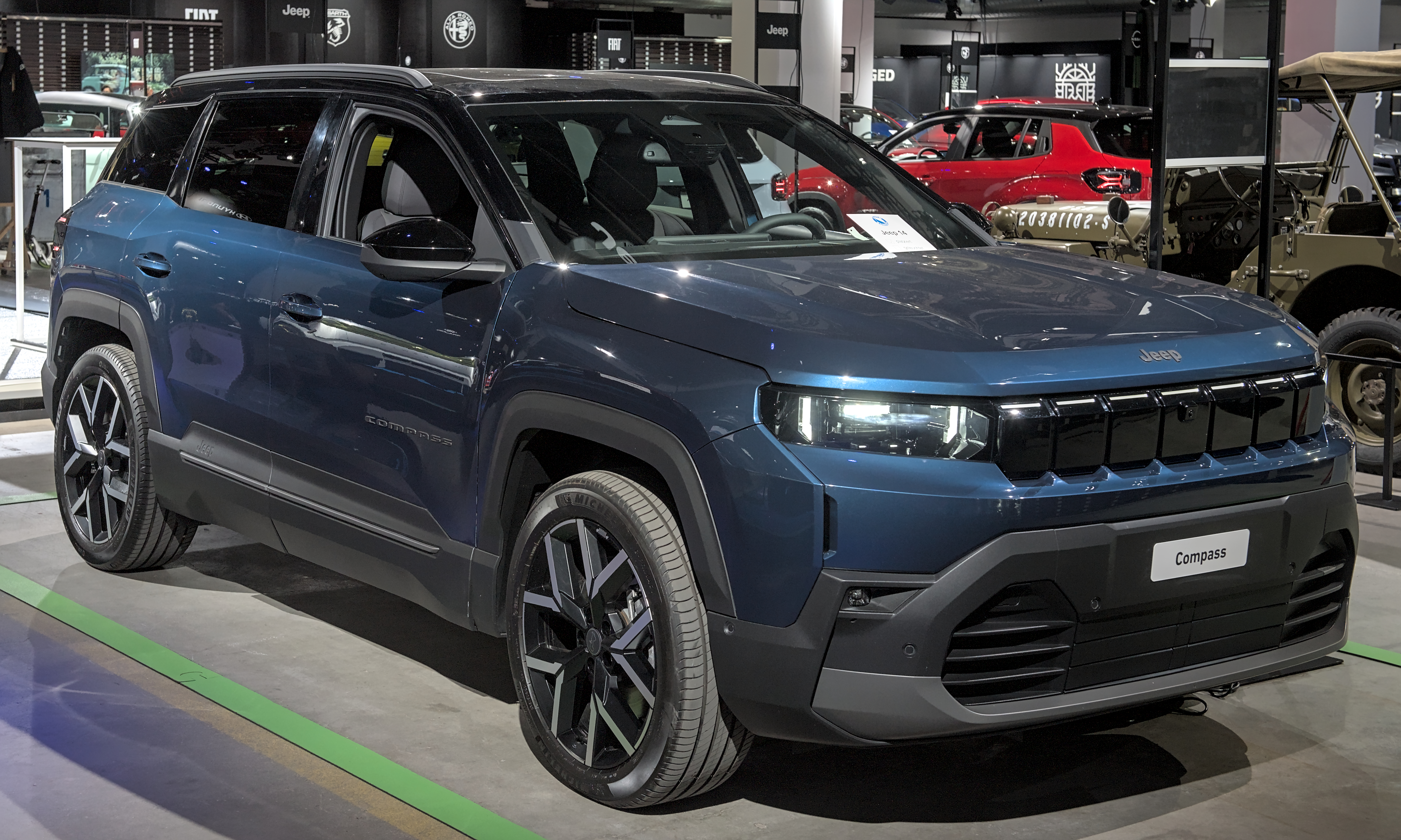
Jeep Compass III

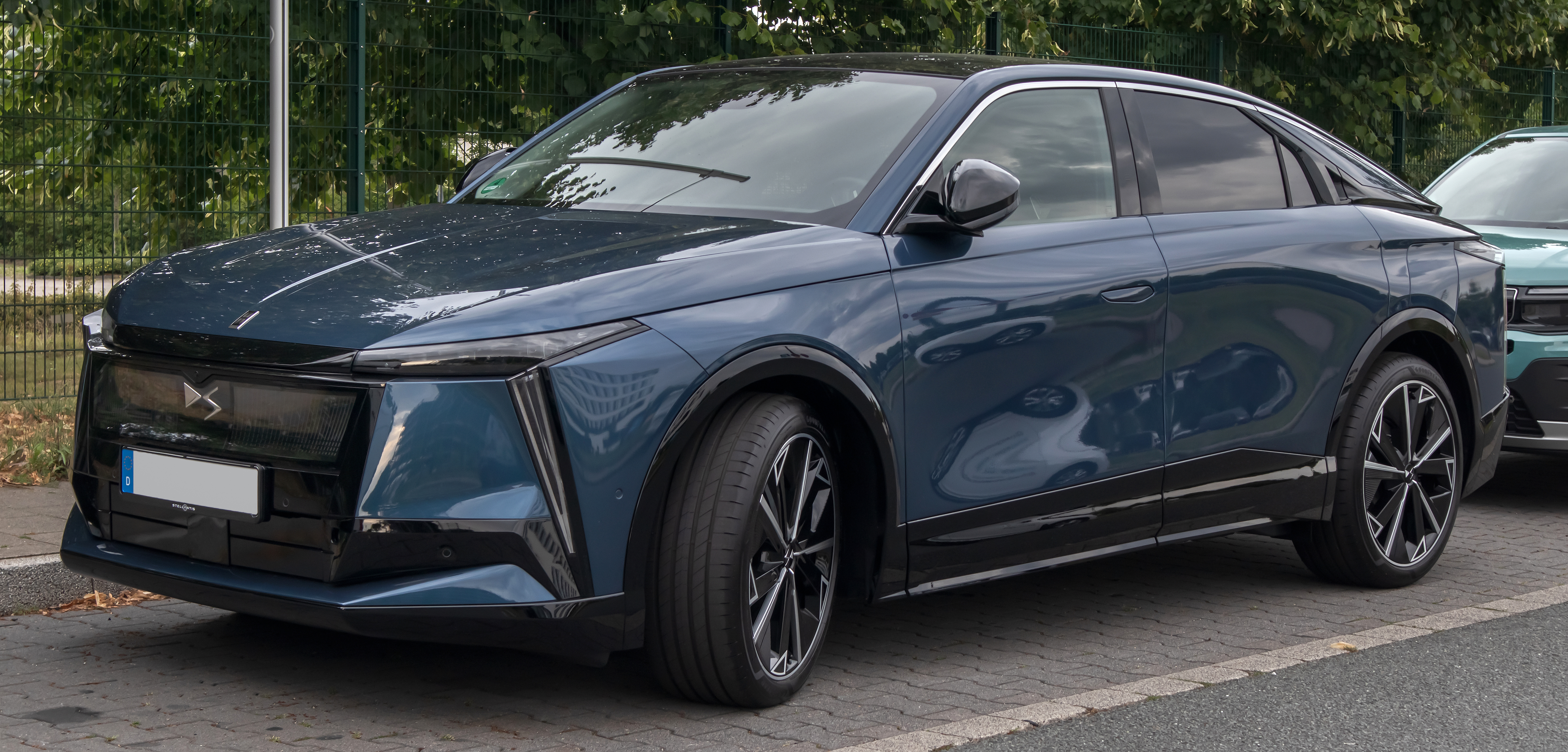
DS N°8
- STLA One Transverse, supporting products using transverse engine installations for B/C/Ds (Replacing STLA Medium in the North American market)
  - 2028– Chrysler Airflow (2027) (production)
  - 2028– Dodge GLH
  - 2029– Jeep Compass III (North America only)
  - 2029/30– Jeep Cherokee (seventh generation)
- STLA Large Transverse, supporting products using transverse engine installations for C/D/Es
  - Jeep Recon (2026)
  - Jeep Wagoneer S (2024)
  - Jeep Cherokee (KM) (2026)
  - Chrysler Airflow (2027) (concept only)
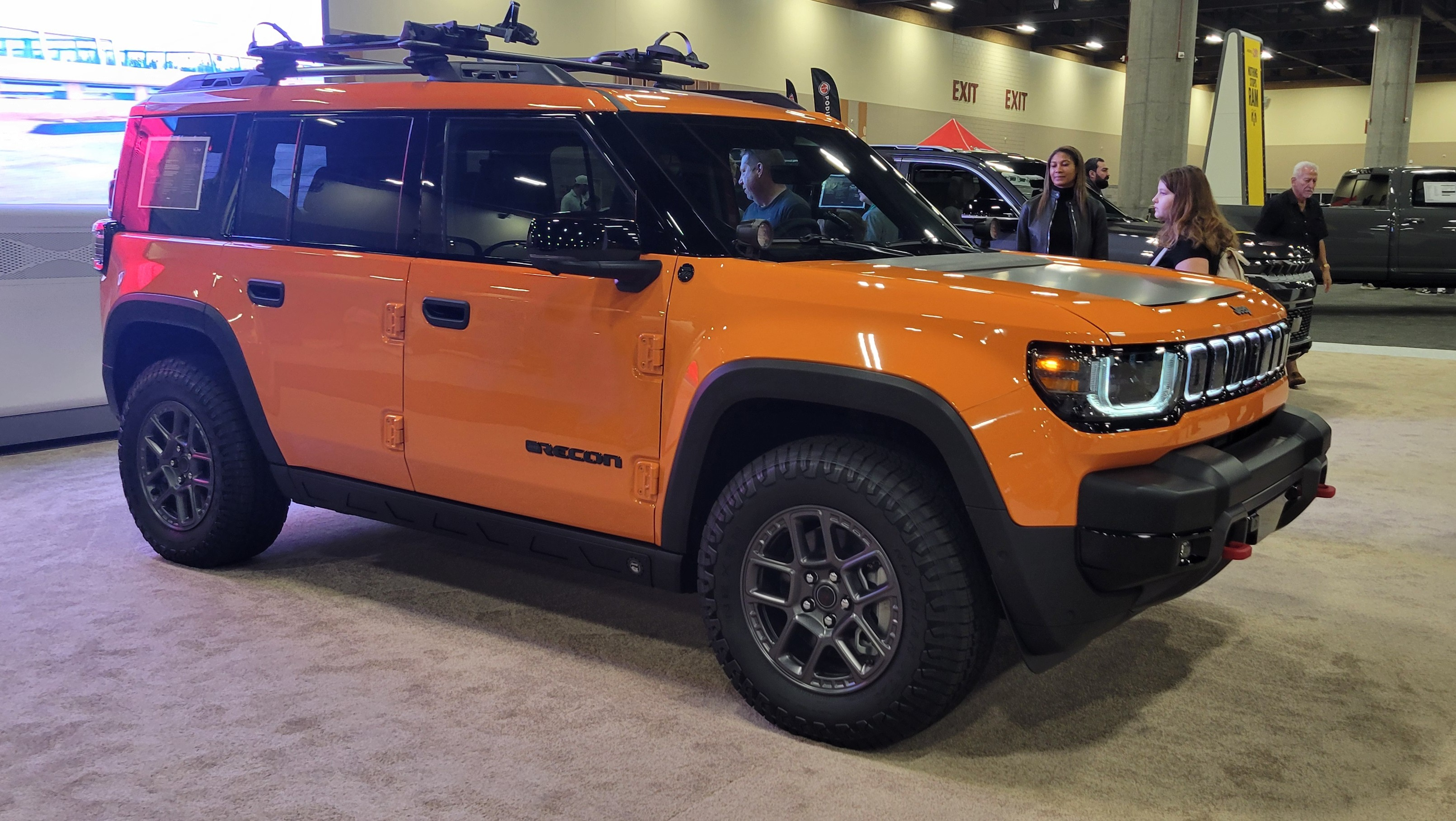
Jeep Recon

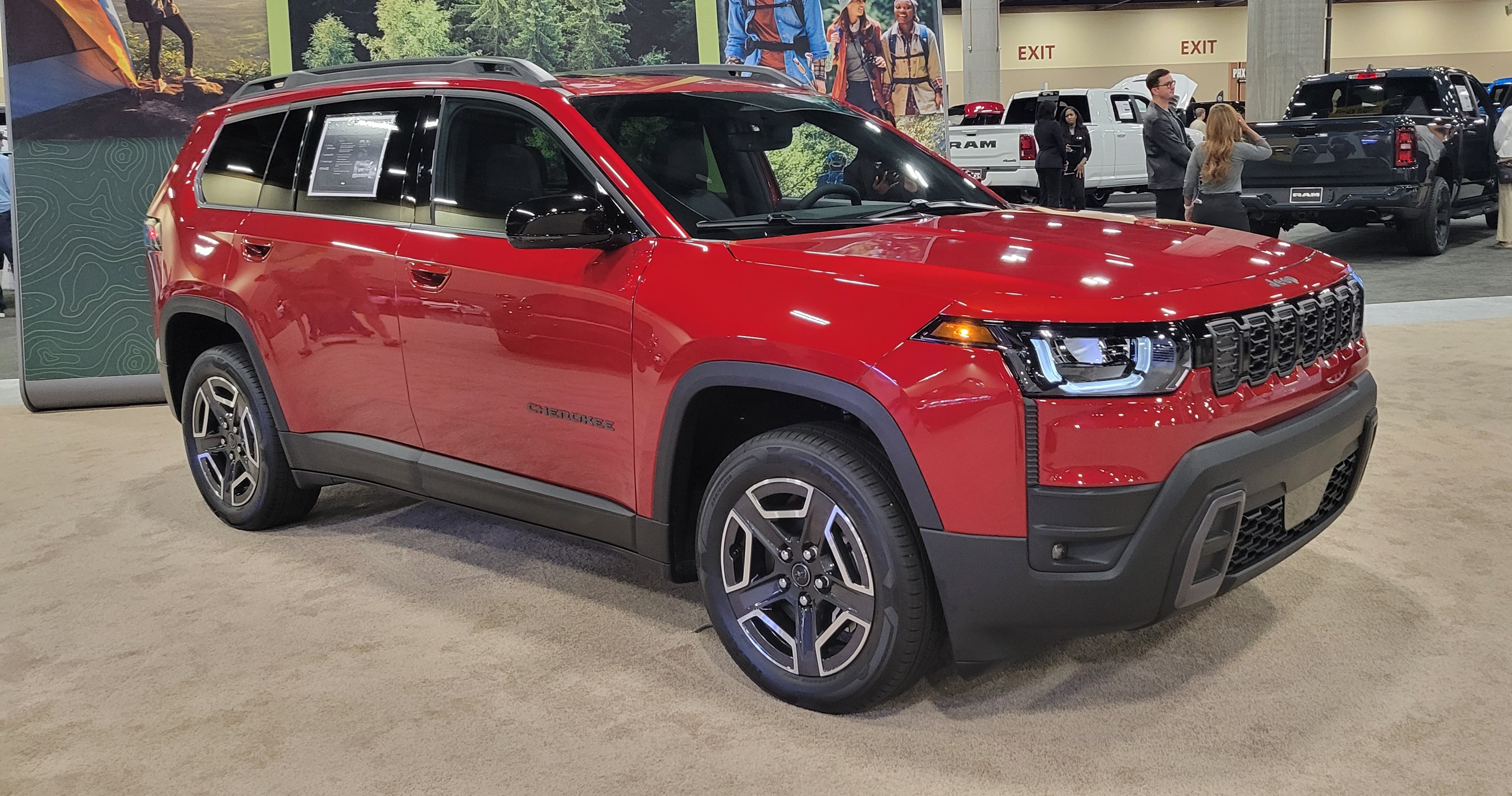
Jeep Cherokee (KM)

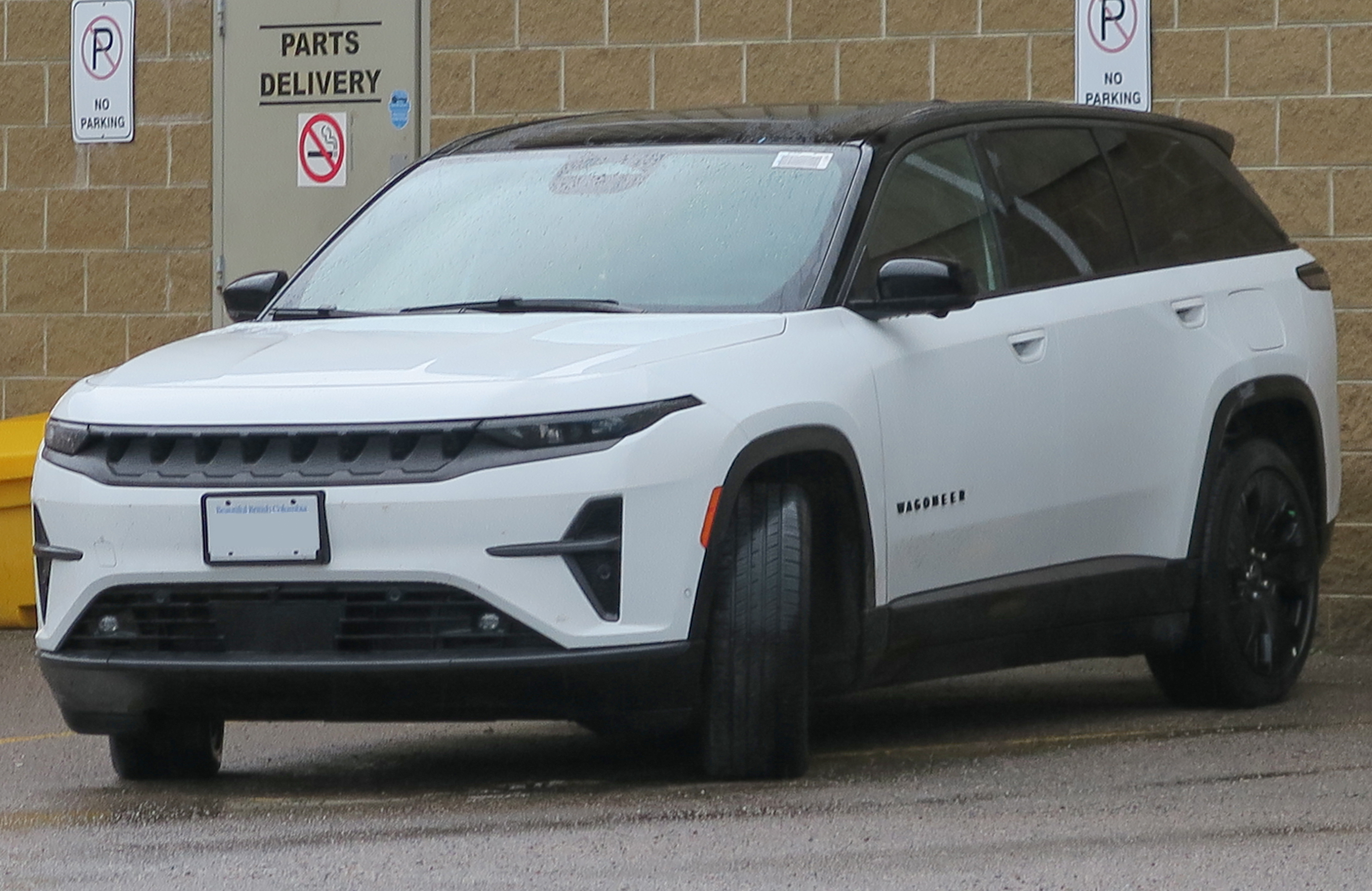
Jeep Wagoneer S
- STLA Large Longitudinal, supporting products using longitudinal engine installations for D/Es
  - Dodge Charger (2024)
  - Alfa Romeo Stelvio II (TBA)
  - Alfa Romeo Giulia II (TBA)
  - Maserati Levante II (TBA)
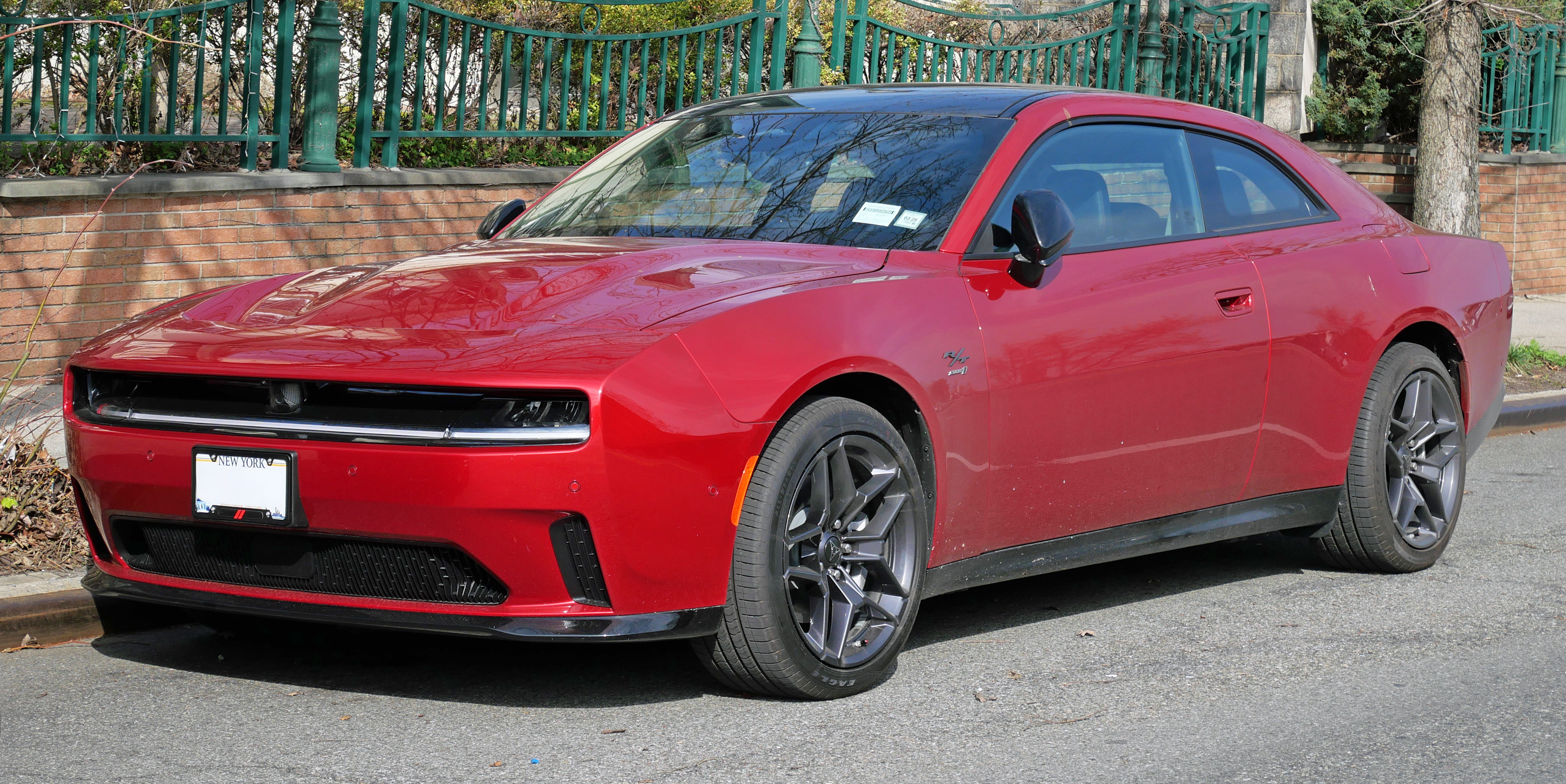
Dodge Charger (2024)
- STLA Frame, for large trucks and light commercial vehicles
  - Ram 1500 REV (2027)

=== Technology platforms ===
- STLA Brain
  - STLA AutoDrive, SAE level 3 with OTA
- STLA SmartCockpit

== See also ==
- Stellantis
- Category:Stellantis platforms
- List of Chrysler platforms
- List of PSA platforms
- List of Fiat platforms
