= Fiat Compact platform =

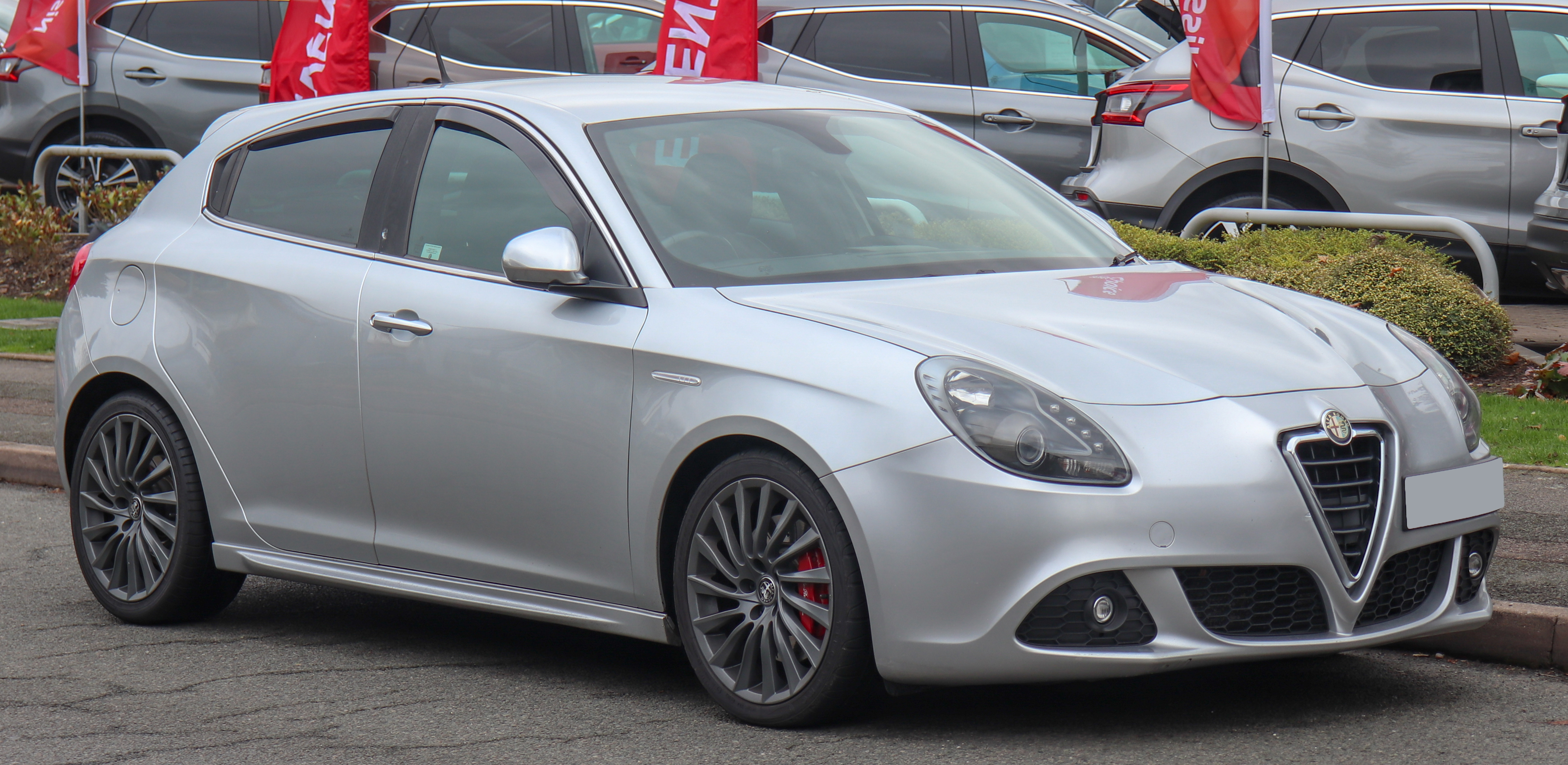

Overview
- Manufacturer: Fiat (2010–2014); Chrysler (2012–2014); FCA (2014–2021); Stellantis (2021–present)
- Also called: Short wheelbase: Compact; Long wheelbase: Compact-Wide
- Production: 2010–present

Body and chassis
- Class: Compact car platform
- Layout: Transverse Front-engine, front-wheel drive / four-wheel drive

Powertrain
- Engines: petrol: 1.4 L FIRE turbo I4; 1.4 L Multiair turbo I4; 1.75 L DI turbo I4; 2.0 L Tigershark I4; 2.4 L Tigershark Multiair I4; 3.2 L Pentastar V6; 3.6 L Pentastar V6; diesel: 1.6 L Multijet I4; 2.0 L Multijet I4

Chronology
- Predecessor: Fiat C-platform; Chrysler GS platform Chrysler RT platform
- Successor: STLA Large Transverse

The Compact platform (C-EVO) was developed by engineers of the Fiat Group for the construction of small family cars (compact cars) and large family cars (mid-size cars) with front-wheel drive or four-wheel drive. The first incarnation of this platform was the Alfa Romeo Giulietta which was unveiled in 2010. Fiat invested 100 million euros into the construction of the Compact Platform.

== Origin ==
Developed in Turin, Italy, the Compact platform (Known as C-EVO) was designed to adapt to future cars of both the Fiat Group and Chrysler Group. Developed a new high-performance platform that uses only a front central part of the floor from the old C-platform. The frame composition is 84% high-strength steel (as opposed to the old C-platform, 65% of which was high-strength steel) and 4% aluminum, and magnesium. The front suspension uses MacPherson Evo struts with aluminum uprights and is 4 kilograms (8.8 lb) lighter than the previous design with steel uprights (as used in the Fiat Bravo). The rear suspension uses an independent multi-link suspension and each of them consists of two lateral links with an aluminum longitudinal arm that mounts the hub and spring. Using aluminium rather than steel, which has a higher density, enabled a total combined weight-savings in the suspension bits of 14 kilograms. The framework for the rear seats and the magnesium alloy cross member reduced weight by 35% in comparison to earlier cars.

The platform offers a compact transverse engine at the front with either front or four-wheel drive. The total platform weight of the standard version (on the compact models) is 174 kilograms (384 lb).

== C-EVO/CUSW (Compact US Wide) ==
While Fiat's original employment of the compact platform is called C-EVO, Chrysler's employment of the platform is called Compact US Wide and was used for US-built models of Chrysler sedans like the Dodge Dart and Chrysler 200. CUSW first entered production in May 2012. The interchangeable modules make the basic platform suitable for vehicles of differing lengths up to 4.92 metres (16.1 ft). It was designed with additional features for a compact platform that could adapt to sports cars like Alfa Romeo.

The engine range, combined with the platform, consists of the compact four-cylinder petrol 1.4 Fire, 1.4 Multiair, 1.75 TBi turbocharged, the 2.0 or 2.4 Chrysler GEMA engine, the 3.2 or the 3.6 Chrysler Pentastar V6 engine, and the 1.6, 2.0 and 2.2 Multijet turbodiesel engines. Fiat and Chrysler planned to build about 1 million vehicles a year by 2014 based on this platform. Eight upcoming Chrysler Group vehicles are planned to be built on Fiat's Compact Wide platform, including the replacement for the Jeep Liberty.

=== Vehicles based on C-EVO/CUSW ===
  - 2010–2020 Alfa Romeo Giulietta
  - 2012–2017 Dodge Dart/Fiat Viaggio/Ottimo
  - 2015–2017 Chrysler 200
  - 2014–2023 Jeep Cherokee
  - 2018–2022 Jeep Grand Commander
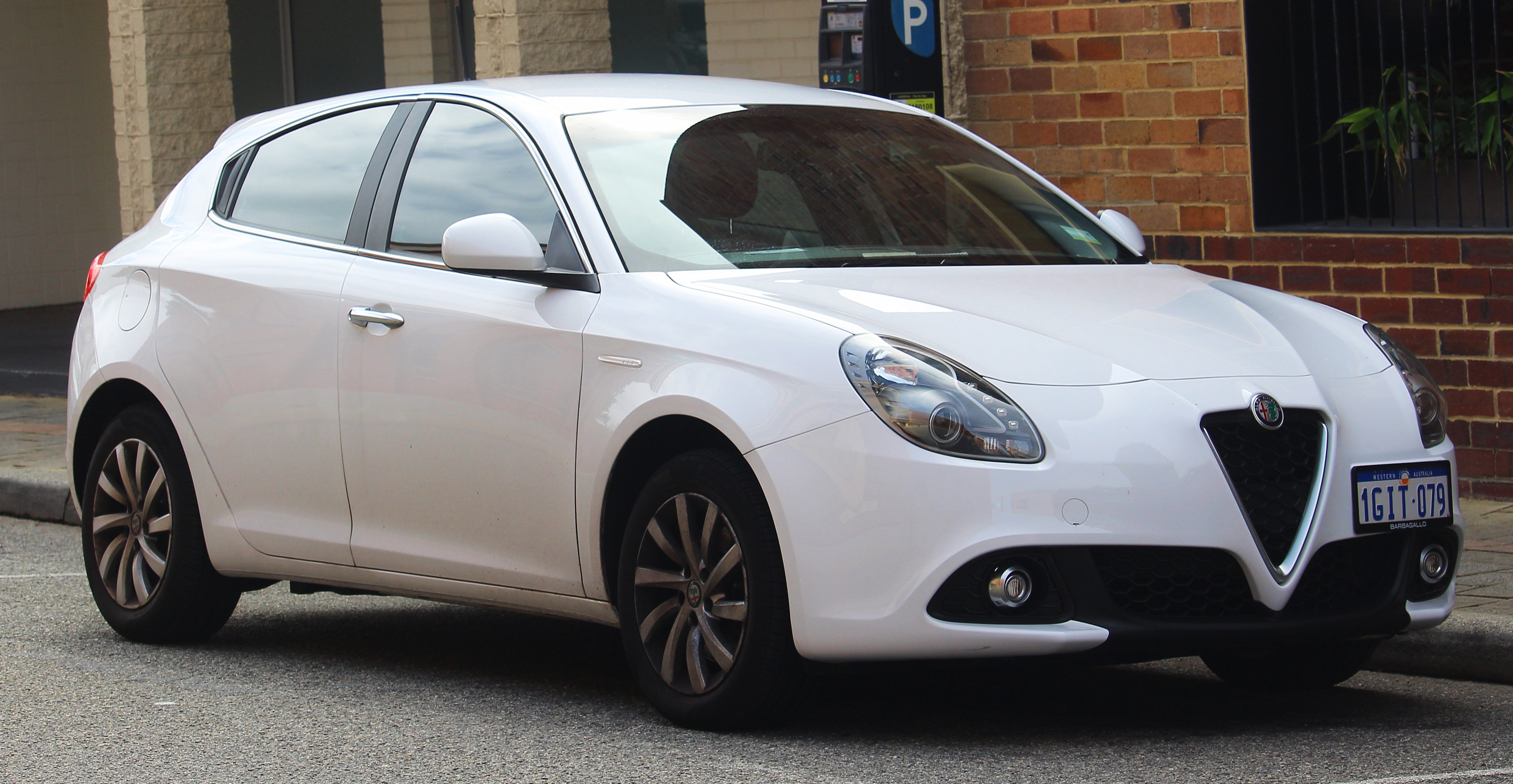
Alfa Romeo Giulietta

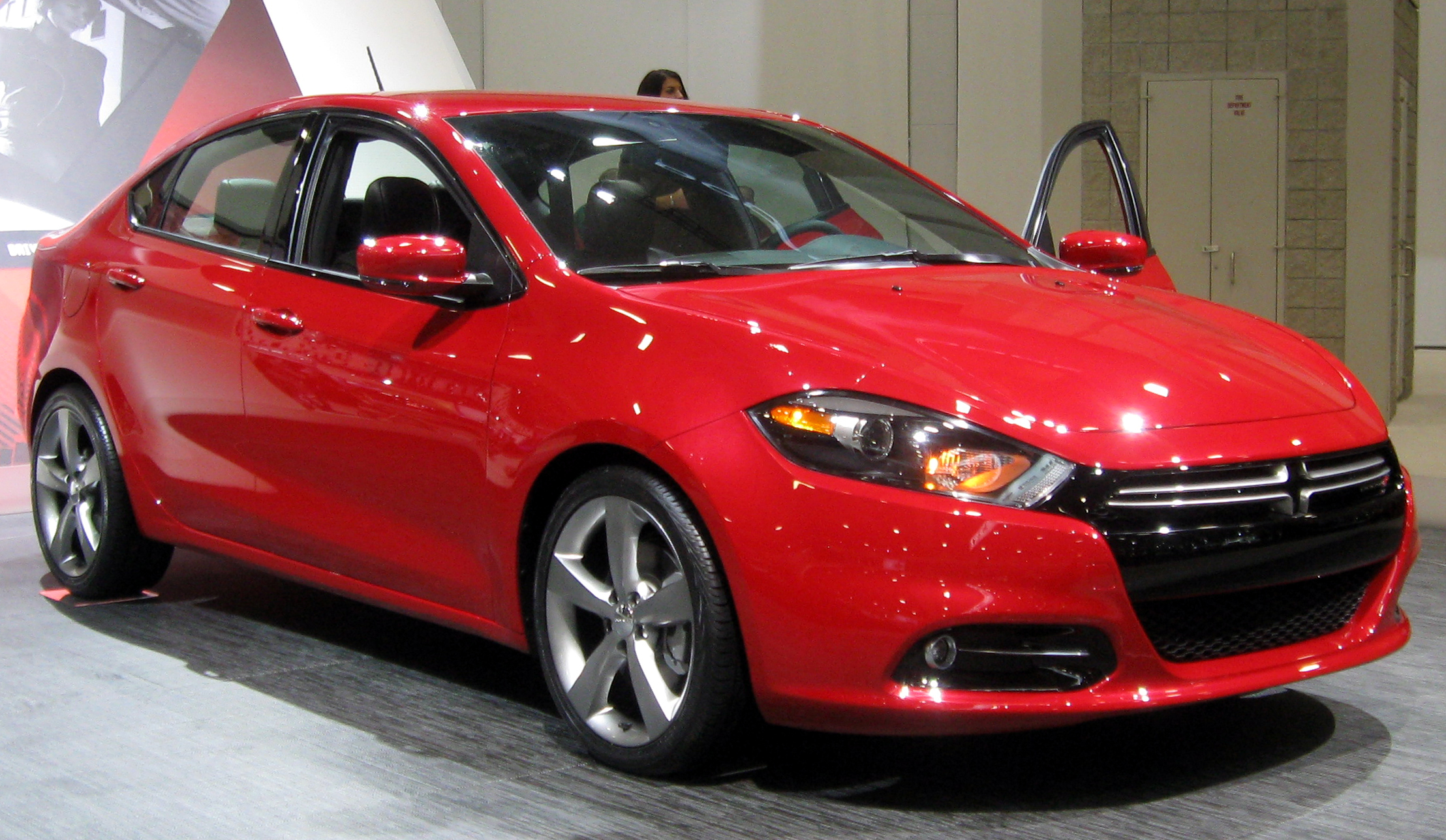
Dodge Dart

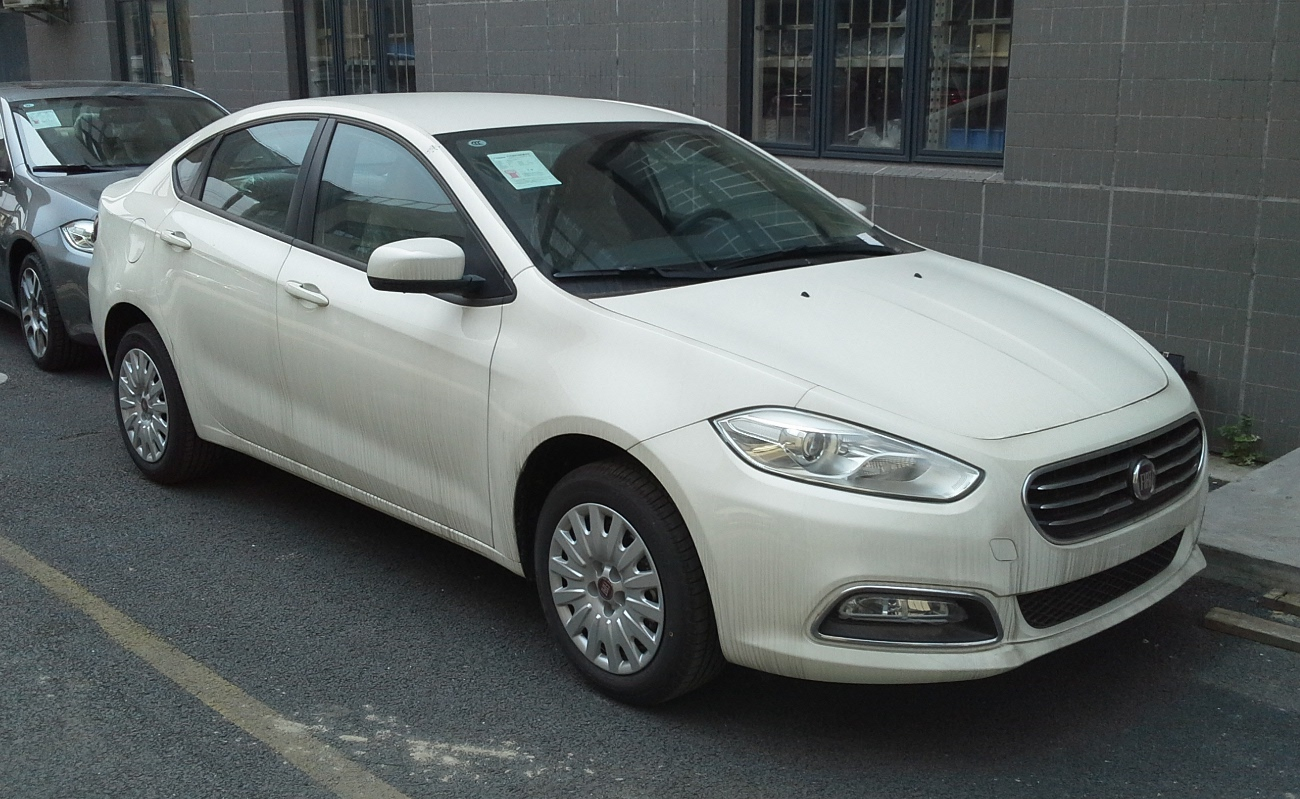
Fiat Viaggio

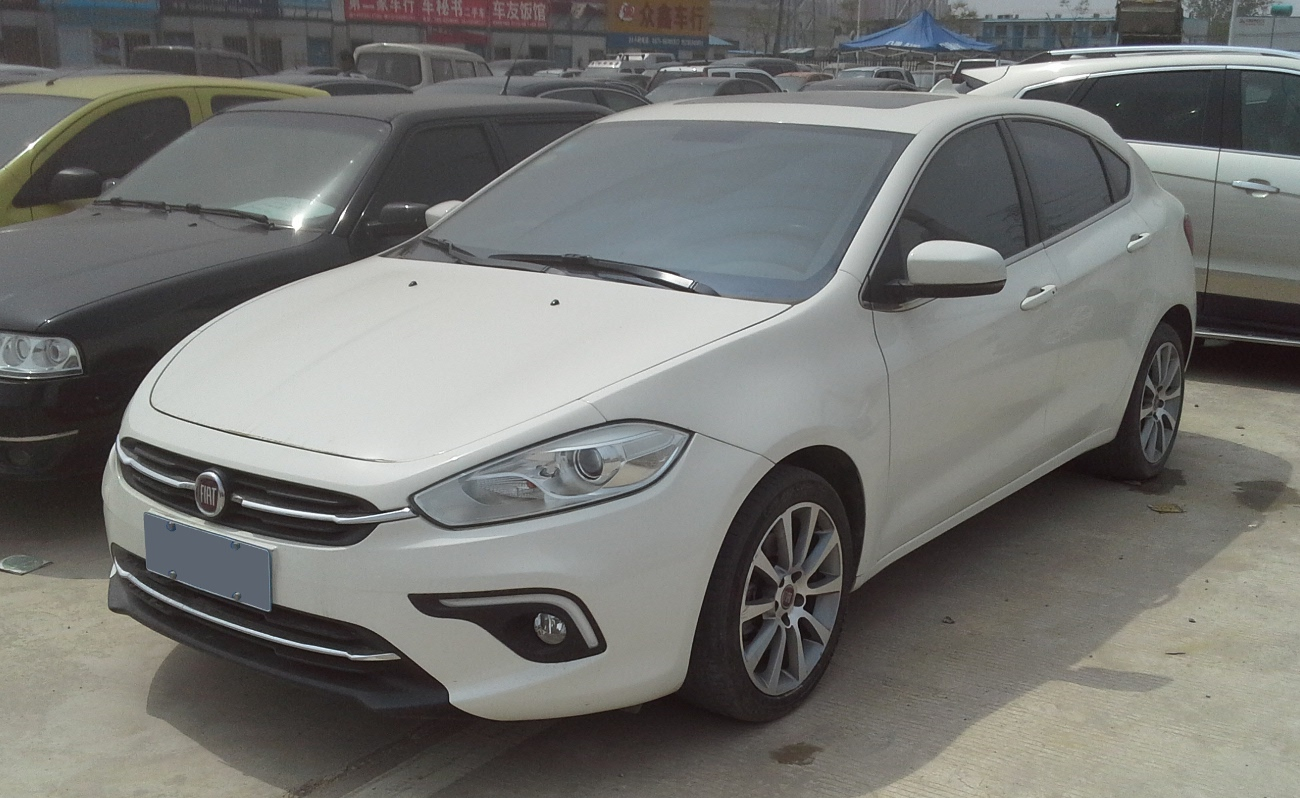
Fiat Ottimo

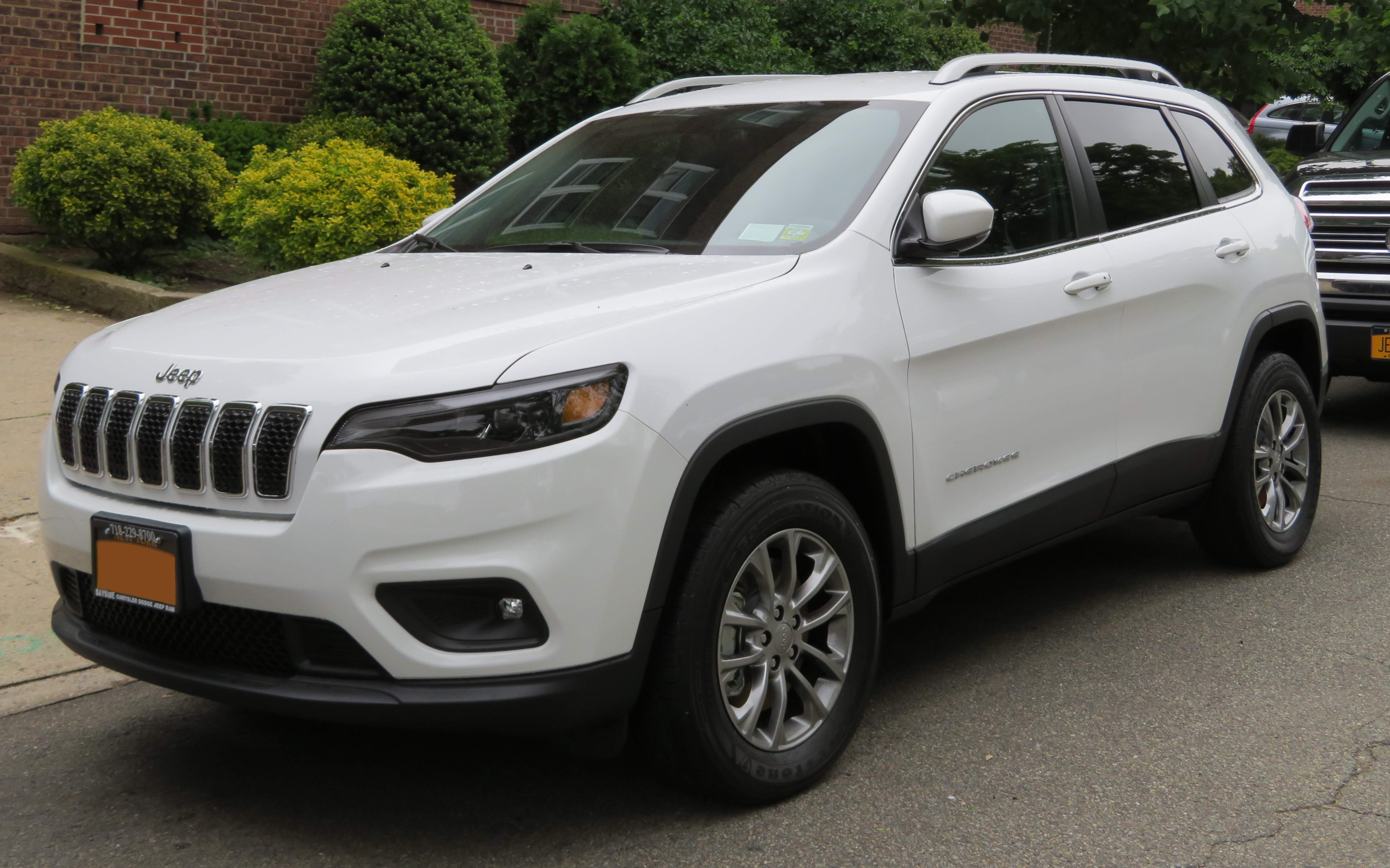
Jeep Cherokee

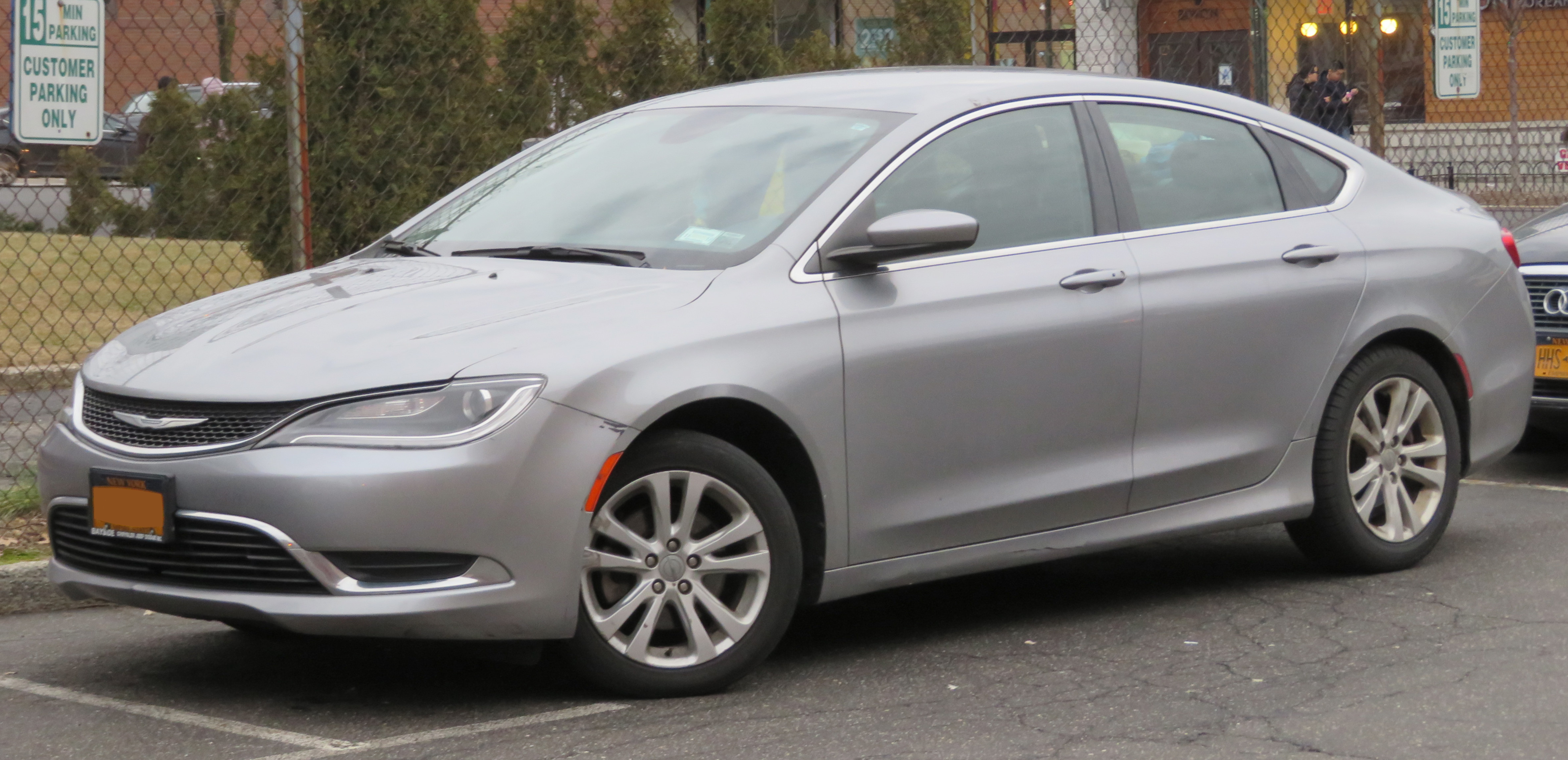
Chrysler 200

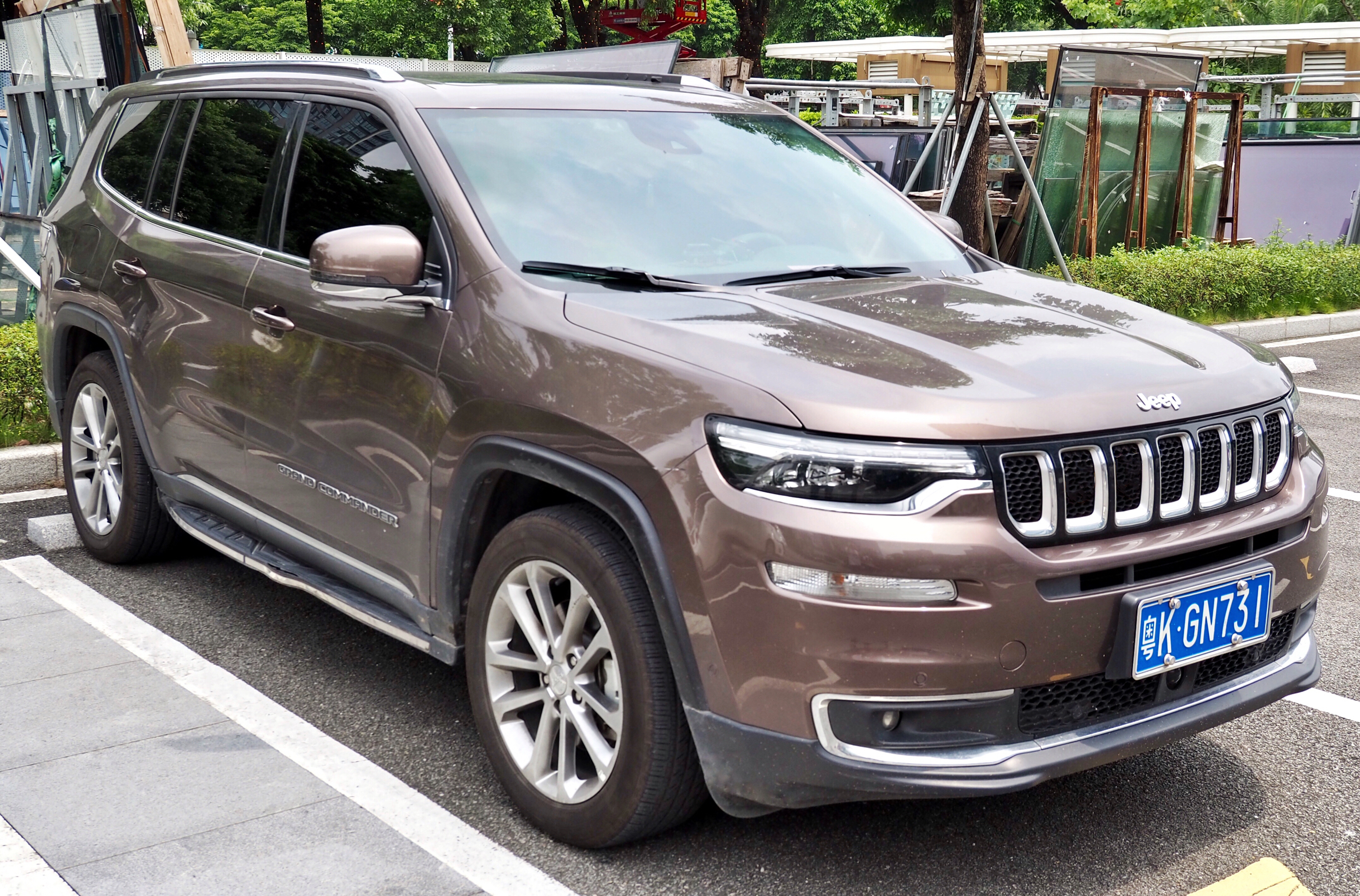
Jeep Grand Commander

== RU Platform ==
The Chrysler Pacifica and Voyager minivans (2016–) are derived from CUSW rather than being a clean-sheet design, though they are tracked as a separate platform. While the Pacifica's architecture is a derivative of the Compact U.S. Wide platform, and while the minivan shares CUSW assemblies, it is not classified as CUSW itself.

=== Vehicles based on RU ===
- 2016–present Chrysler Pacifica
- 2020–2026 Chrysler Voyager
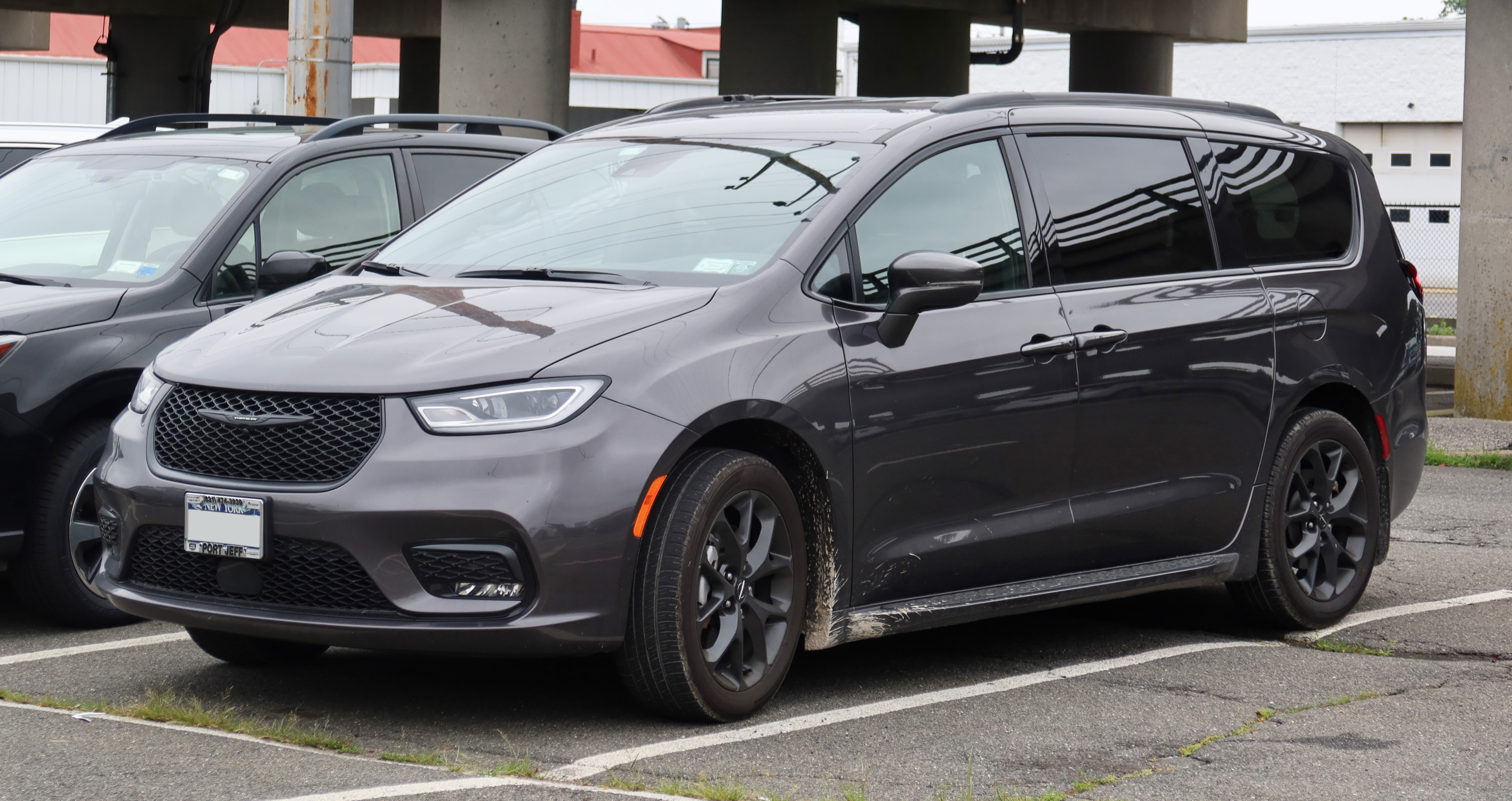
Chrysler Pacifica

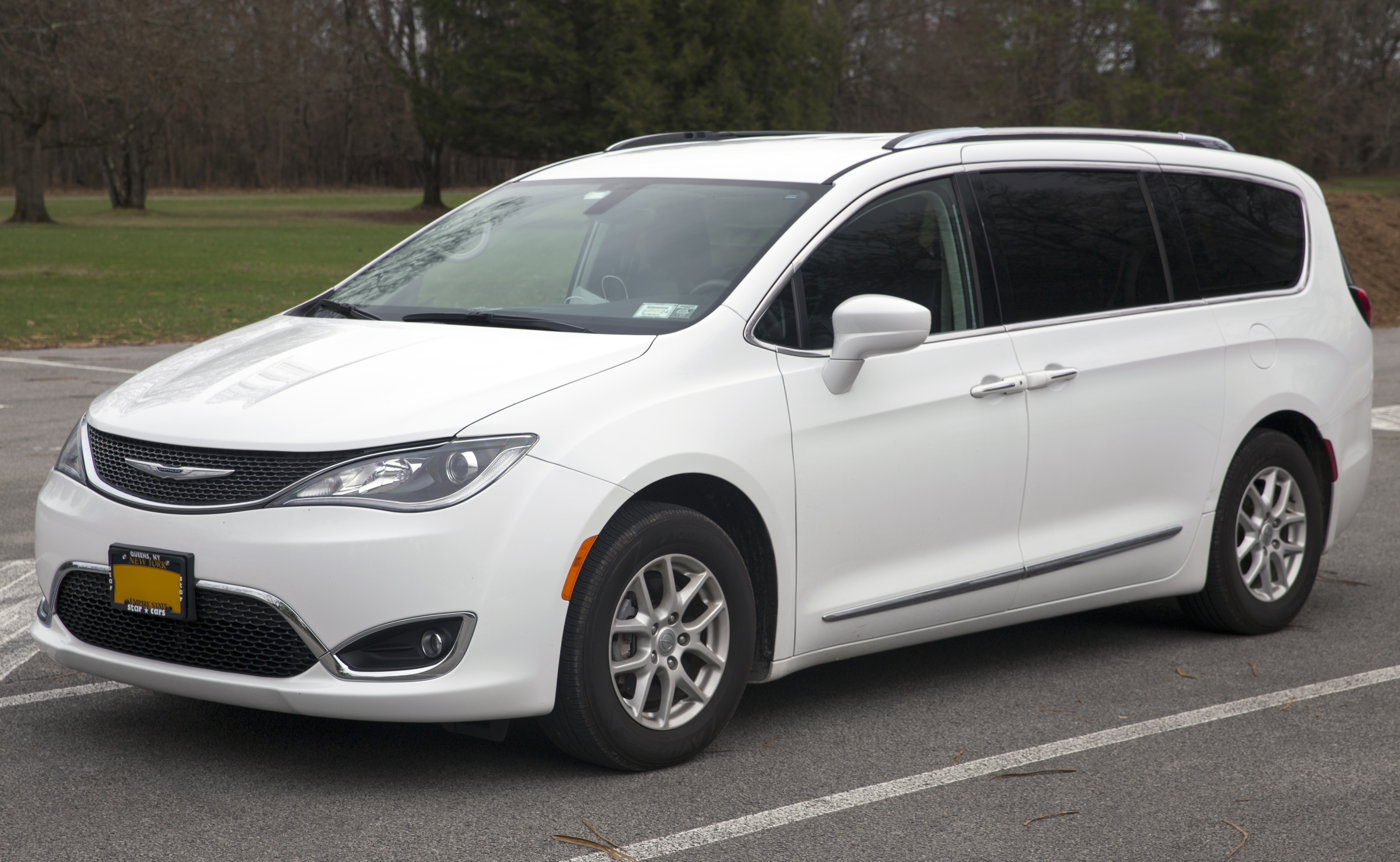
Chrysler Voyager

== STLA Large Transverse ==
STLA Large is less a clean-sheet design than a single name spanning two inherited architectures. Its transverse, front- and all-wheel-drive branch—designated STLA Large Transverse and used by the battery-electric Jeep Wagoneer S and Jeep Cherokee—is a continuation of FCA's earlier CUSW (Compact U.S. Wide) platform, whereas the rear-wheel-drive branch, STLA Large Longitudinal, which underpins the successors to the LX-platform cars such as the Dodge Charger, is instead derived from the Giorgio architecture. The original two donor platforms began as very different designs, and that the intent behind grouping them under STLA Large is to broaden the engineering they share and to equip both with a common, newly developed electrical and electrification architecture.

=== Vehicles based on STLA Large Transverse ===
- Jeep Wagoneer S (2024-)
- Jeep Cherokee (KM) (2025-)
- Jeep Recon (2026-)
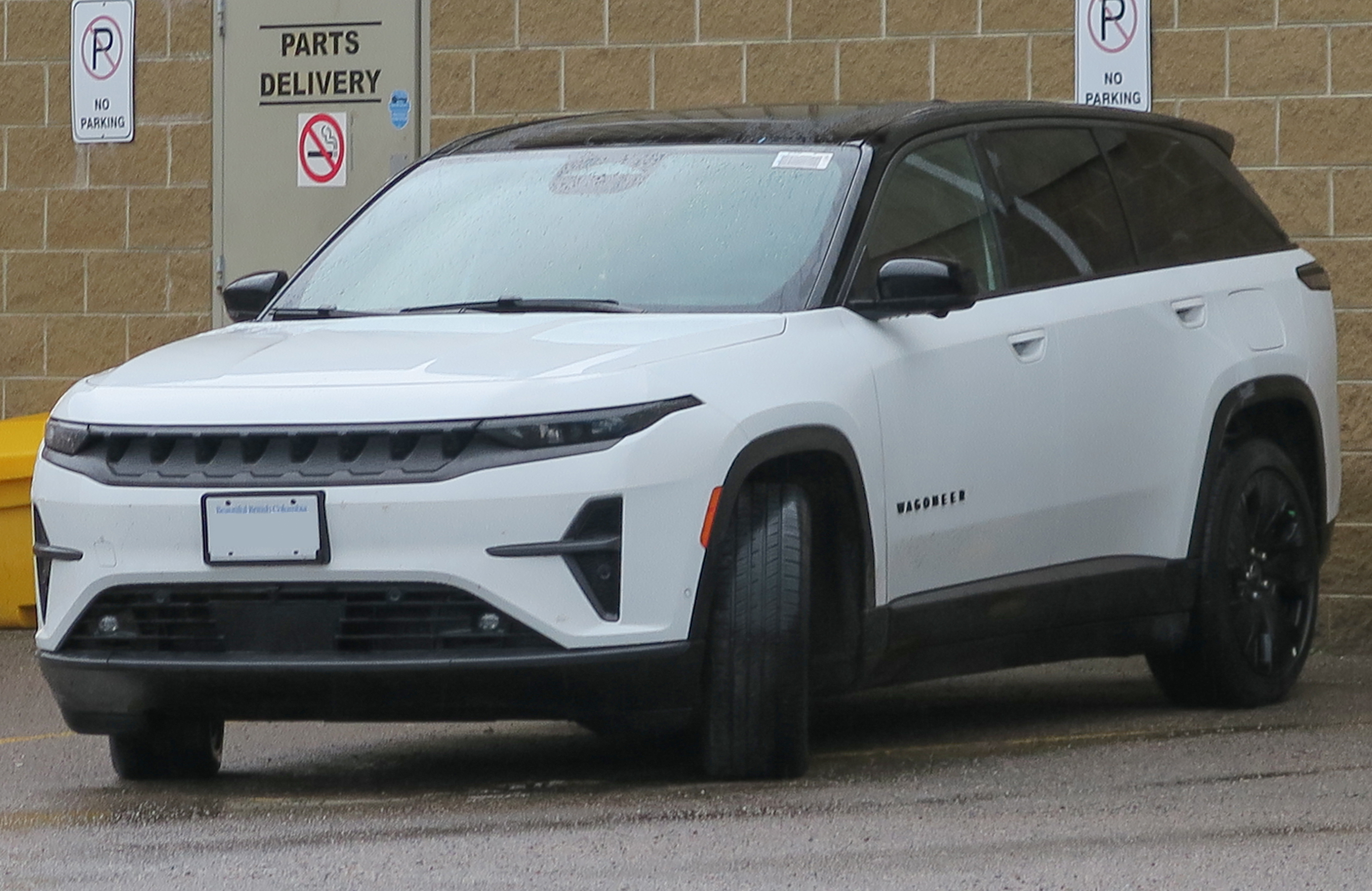
Jeep Wagoneer S

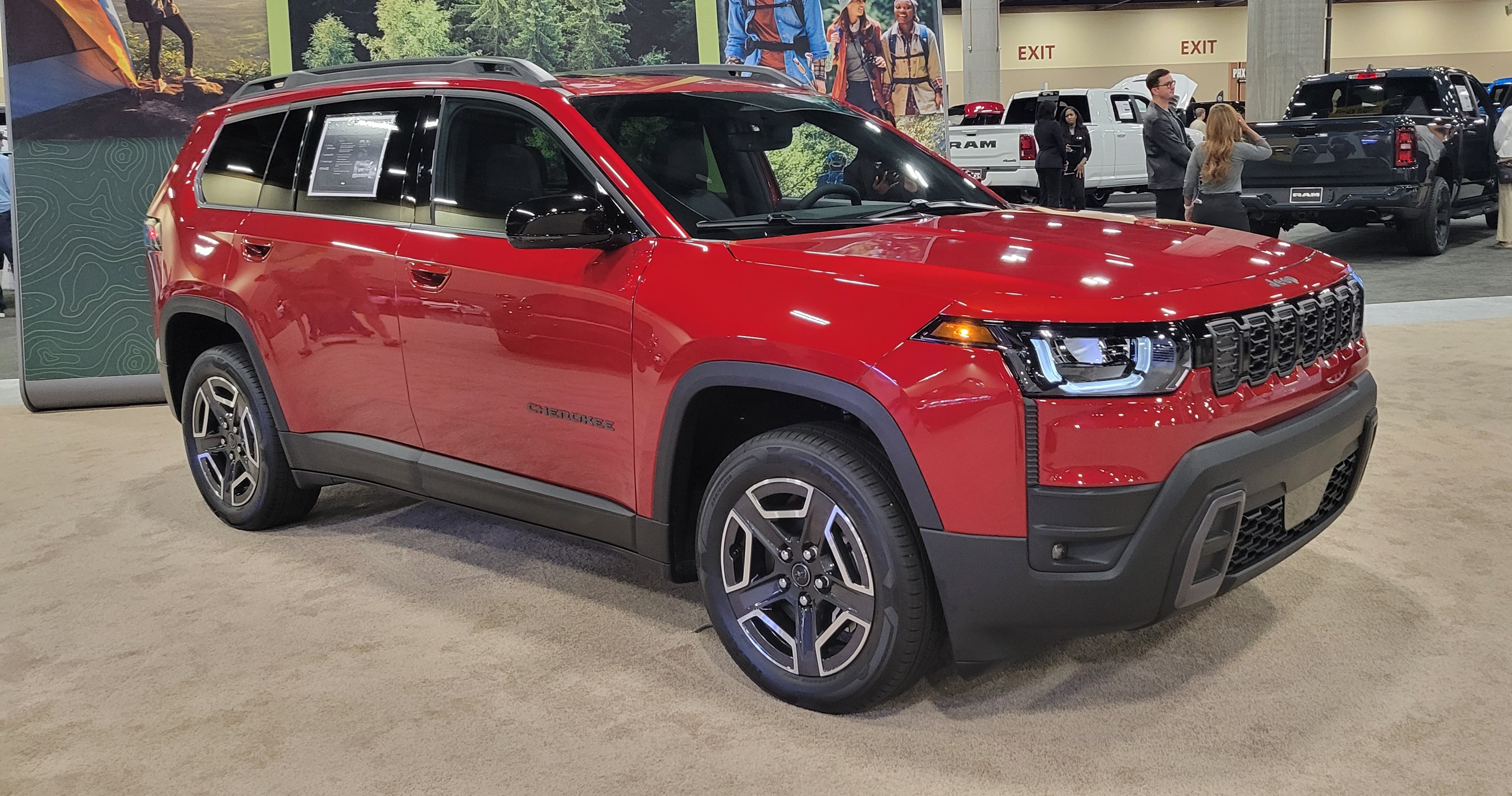
Jeep Cherokee (KM)

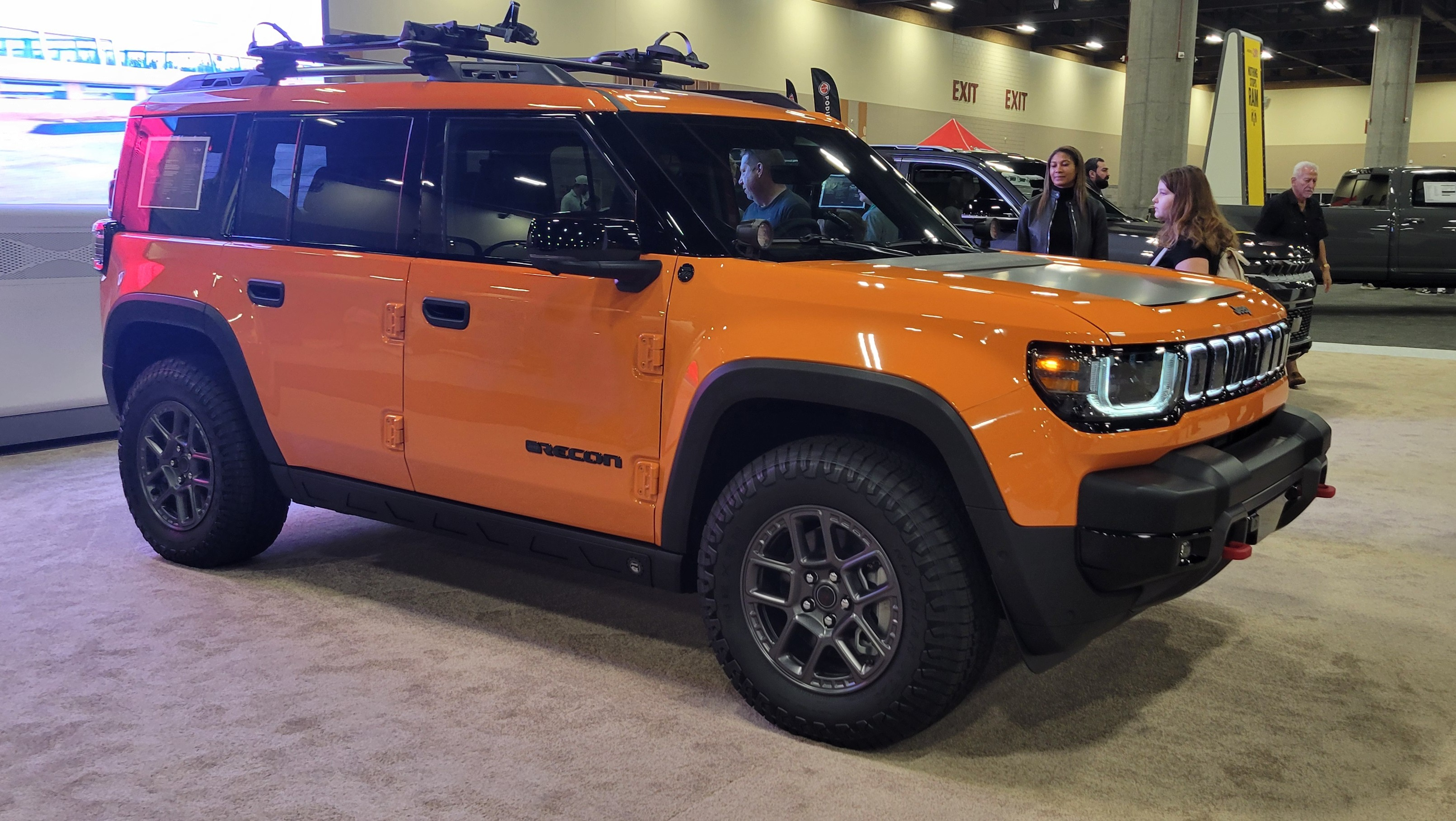
Jeep Recon
