= STLA =

STLA can refer to:

- the Socialist Trade and Labor Alliance, a non-extant socialist labor union in the United States
- Stellantis, a multinational automotive manufacturing corporation
  - the STLA electric vehicle platforms created by Stellantis
