= Chrysler Airflow (2027) =

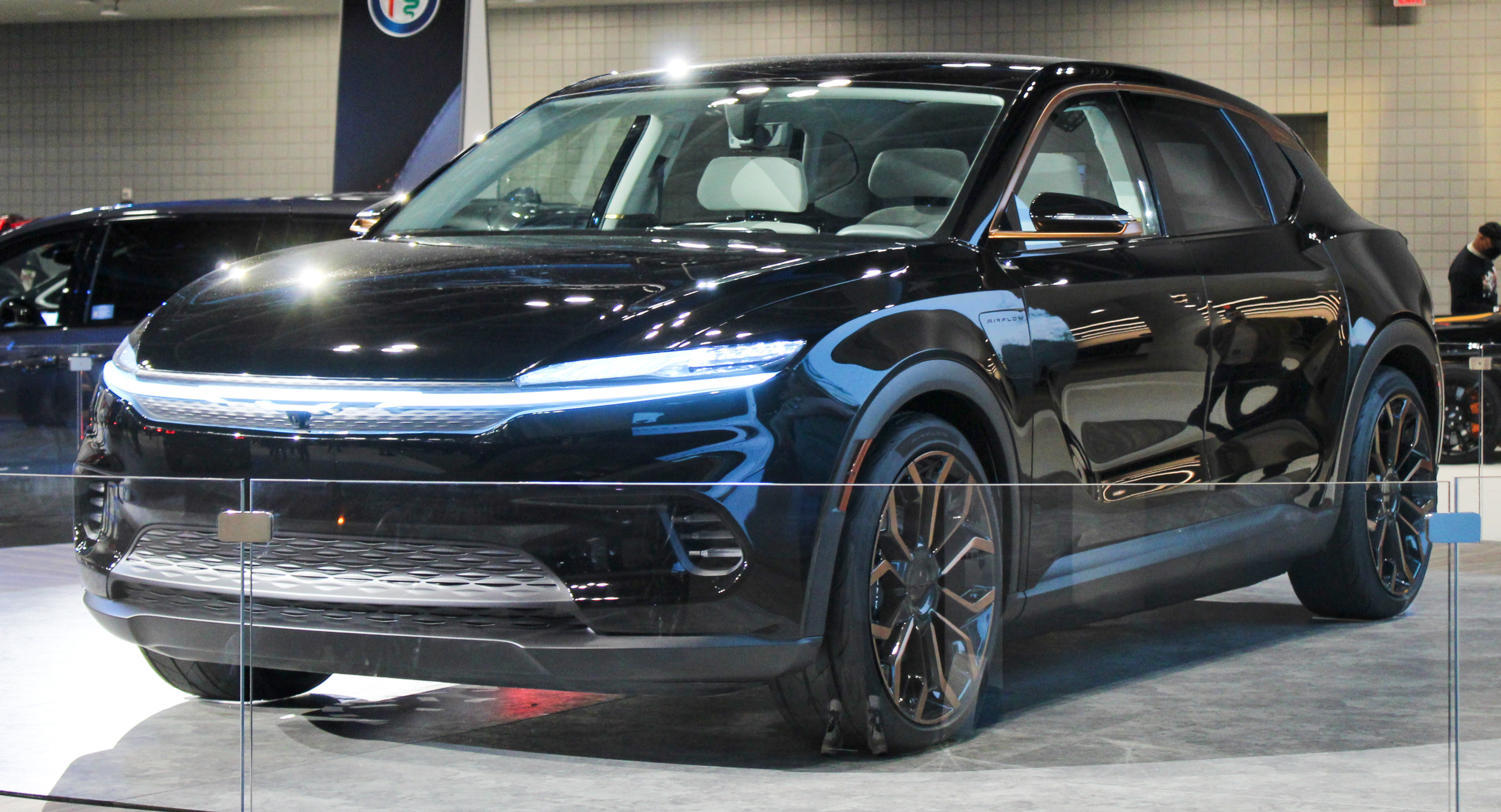

Overview
- Manufacturer: Chrysler (Stellantis North America)
- Model code: CA
- Production: Late 2027 (to commence)
- Model years: 2028 (planned)
- Assembly: United States: Belvidere, Illinois
- Designer: Randy Hjelm

Body and chassis
- Class: Mid-size crossover SUV
- Body style: 5-door crossover
- Layout: Front-motor, all-wheel drive
- Platform: STLA One
- Related: Jeep Compass (North America); Dodge GLH

The Chrysler Airflow is a concept mid-size crossover SUV developed by Chrysler.

== Launch and development ==
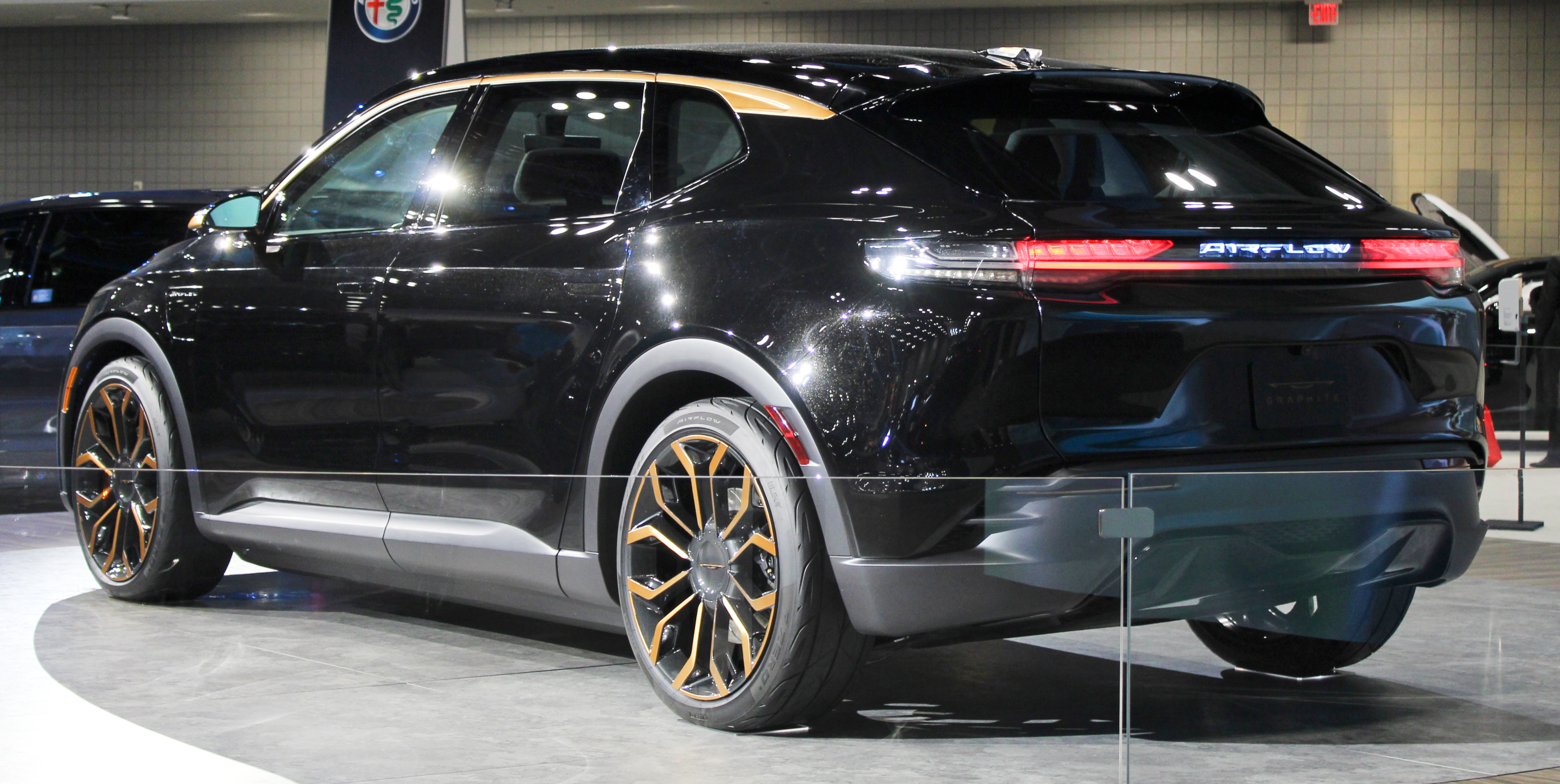
Rear view

The Chrysler Airflow Vision Concept was announced by the FCA USA at CES 2020 ahead of its official presentation two years later at CES 2022. A production-ready concept made its debut at the 2022 New York International Auto Show.

The Airflow is named after the original Chrysler Airflow, the first car whose design took into account the importance of aerodynamics. The goal is to show an evolution of the automobile as did its ancestor.

== Specifications ==
The Airflow is equipped with an electric motor and a futuristic design. Shaped like a compact SUV, the lines are fluid but muscular. The wheels are wrapped in their arches, and the grille features an illuminated Chrysler winged logo. Inside, all of the equipment is digital with the exception of the start button and the steering wheel navigation keys. The screen interface is customizable, each passenger having access to vehicle information in real time. The vehicle control system will be one of the first to leverage the STLA Brain software architecture, an AI driven driver assist and experience ecosystem for Stellantis vehicles.

== Production ==
While the Airflow was making its way to a production schedule, in mid-2023, the head of design indicated that an already-in-progress alternative design would take over for the design that the public had seen for the previous two years. It was originally expected to debut for the 2025 model year.

In January 2025, a leaked email to suppliers suggested that development of the production version of the Airflow, known internally as "C6X (CA)", was delayed to re-evaluate powertrain strategies, but is expected to resume development in Summer 2025, with a pre-production reveal in early to mid 2026. The actual production model will debut in the second half of 2026 as a 2027MY. At the Chrysler Carlisle Nationals event in June 2025, Chrysler (brand) CEO Christine Feuell announced that C6X development was resumed and that the production version will be a hybrid along with gas-powered/internal combustion(ICE) models. The powertrain at launch will be the upcoming 1.6L Stellantis Prince engine Turbocharged I-4 Hybrid engine which debuted later in August 2025, in the 2026 Jeep Cherokee (KM).

At Stellantis’s investor day on May 21, 2026 for the company’s FaSTLane 2030 plan, Head of North American Brands Tim Kuniskis and Chrysler Brand CEO Matt McAlear announced that the production version would officially be named the “Airflow” and would be moving to the company’s new STLA One platform and away from the initially expected STLA Large platform. Production is expected to start at Belvidere Assembly in fall 2027 for 2028MY. It is expected to launch with the 1.6L EP6CDTX I4-T in both a base (gas/ice non-hybrid) variant and the hybrid setup variant that debuted in the Jeep Cherokee (KM) and the 2.0L Hurricane 4 EVO I4-T will serve as the upgrade for the Gas version.
