= Toluca Car Assembly =

Chrysler automobile assembly plant in Mexico

Coordinates: 19°17′24″N 99°36′19″W

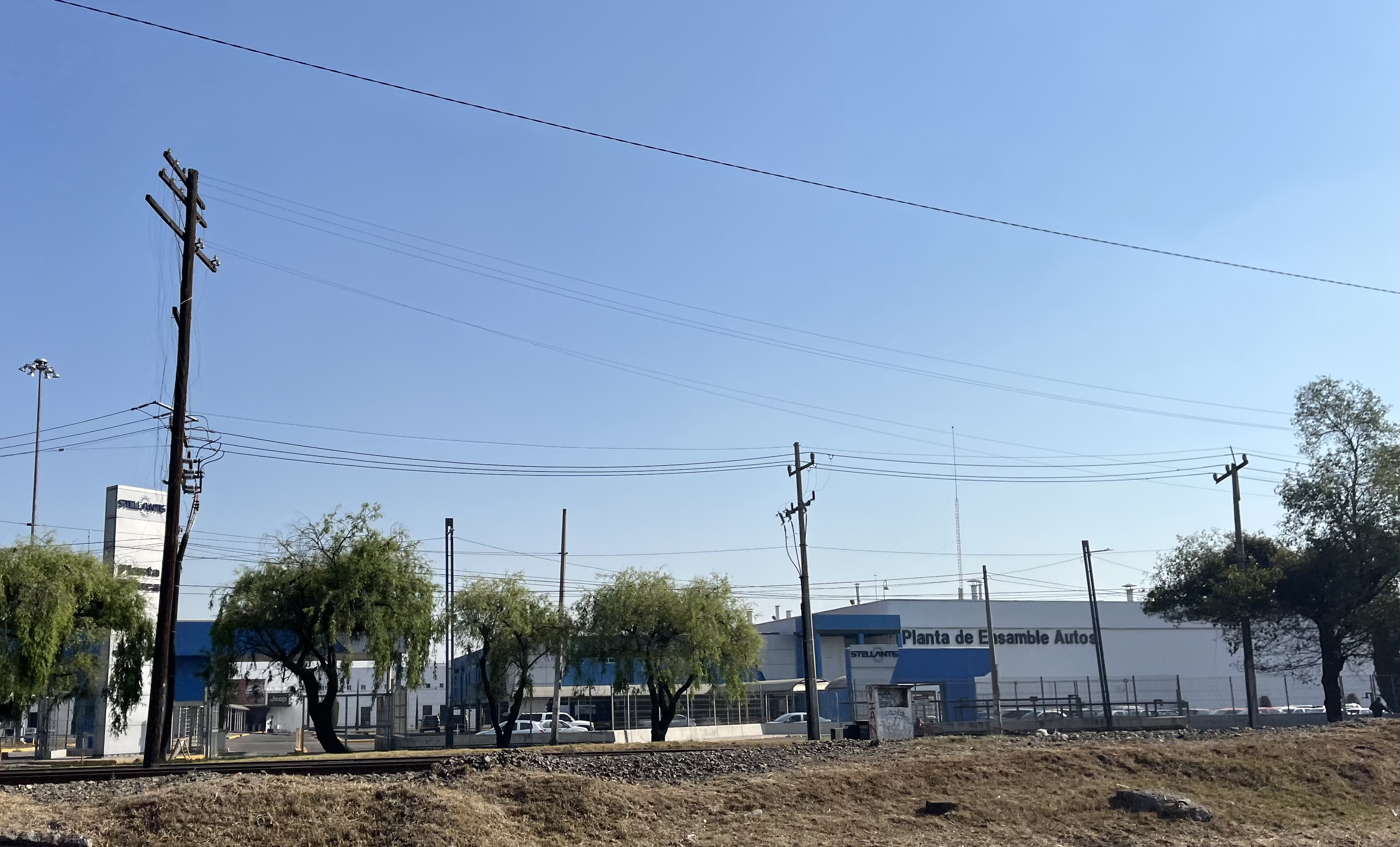
Toluca Car Assembly

Toluca Car Assembly is a 220-acre (89 ha) Stellantis (ex-Chrysler Group) car factory in the Toluca, State of Mexico, opened in 1968.

== History ==
In March 2006, DaimlerChrysler announced a US$1 billion investment in the plant creating a flexible manufacturing system to allow simultaneous production of vehicles of differing car platforms.

The expanded Chrysler Park adjoins the plant and represents a joint venture of eight outside suppliers, including TRW, Magna Intier, IPO, Seglo, HBPO, Android, Brose and Gestamp.

== Products ==
=== Current ===
- Jeep Wagoneer S (2024–2025; 2027 planned)
- Jeep Recon (2026–present)
- Jeep Cherokee (KM) (August 2025–present)

=== Past ===
- Jeep Compass (January 2017–2026)
- Fiat 500 (2011–2019)
- Fiat Freemont (2011–2015)
- Dodge Journey (2008–2020)
- Chrysler PT Cruiser (2000–2010)
- Chrysler Sebring (1995–2000) (convertible only)
- Chrysler Cirrus (1995–2000)
- Chrysler/Dodge/Plymouth Neon (1994–2005) (4-door sedan only)
- Plymouth Acclaim (1989–1995)
- Dodge Spirit (1989–1995)
- Dodge Stratus and Plymouth Breeze (1995–2000)
- Dodge Shadow and Plymouth Sundance (1987–1994)
- Dodge 600 sedan (1986–1989) (Marketed as "Dart" by Chrysler)
- Dodge Aries and Plymouth Reliant sedans, coupés and wagons (1981–1989) (marketed as "Dodge Dart K" and "Valiant Volare K")
- Dodge Magnum (1981–1982)
- Chrysler LeBaron sedan, coupé and wagon (1977–1995) (4-door sedan (1984–1985) sometimes marketed as "Chrysler 600")
- Dodge Diplomat sedan, coupé and wagon (1980–1982) (marketed as "Dodge Dart")
- Plymouth Volare coupé (1976–1980) (marketed as "Valiant Volare")
- Dodge Aspen and Plymouth Volare sedan, coupé and wagon (1976–1980) (marketed as "Dodge Dart"; coupés marketed as "Valiant Volare" and "Valiant Super Bee")
- Dodge Dart sedan and coupé (1968–1976) (marketed as "Dodge Dart", "Valiant" and "Dodge Super Bee")
- Plymouth Valiant coupé (1968–1976) and sedan (1968–1970) (marketed as "Valiant")
