= Jeep Recon =

Battery electric mid-size SUV

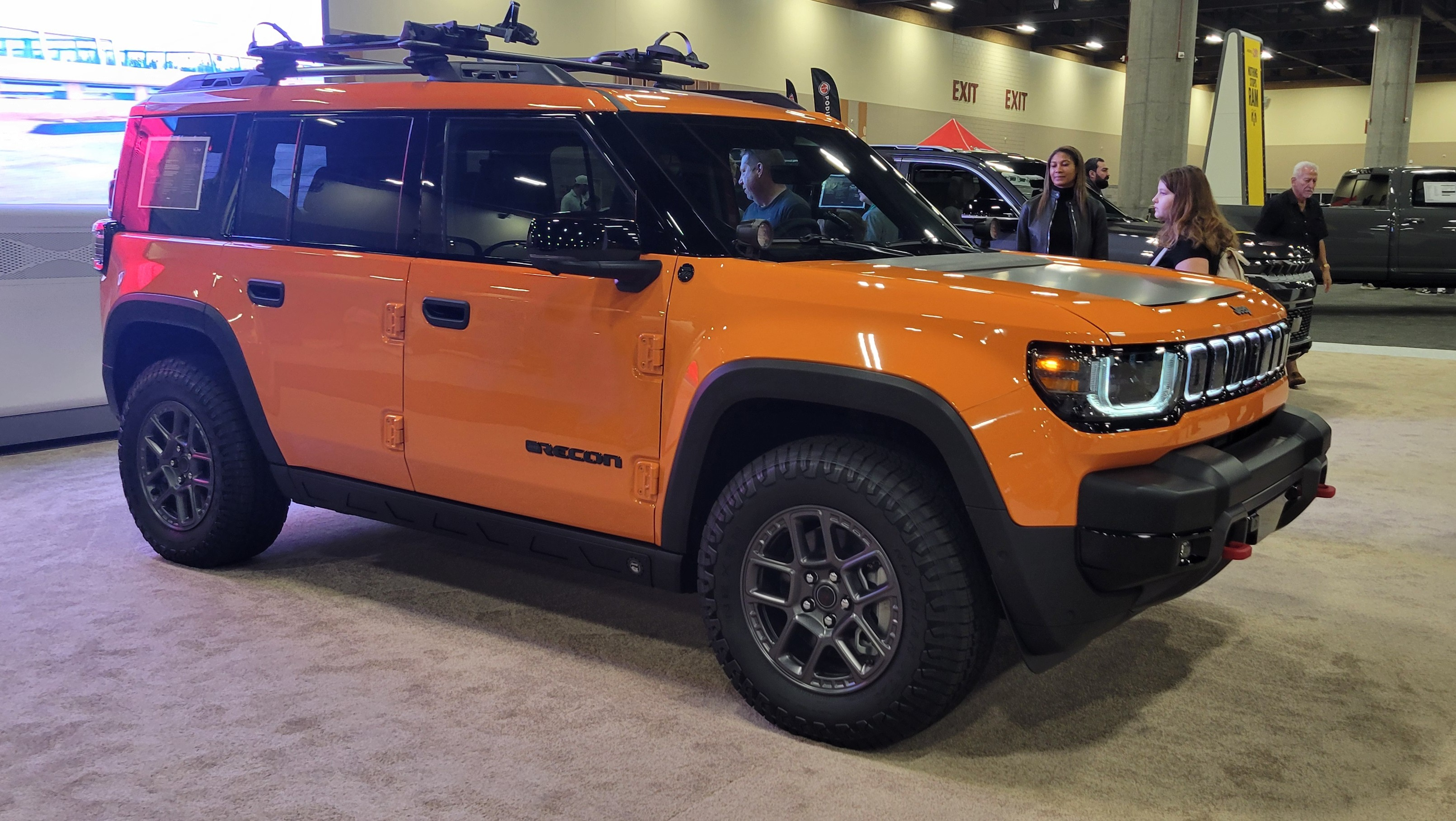

Overview
- Manufacturer: Jeep (Stellantis)
- Production: 2026–present
- Model years: 2026
- Assembly: Mexico: Toluca (Toluca Car Assembly)
- Designer: Josh Holly

Body and chassis
- Class: Mid-size SUV
- Body style: 5-door SUV
- Layout: Dual-motor, all-wheel-drive
- Platform: STLA Large
- Chassis: Unibody
- Related: Jeep Wagoneer S; Jeep Cherokee (KM)

Powertrain
- Power output: 650 horsepower (480 kW)

Dimensions
- Wheelbase: 2,868 mm (113 in)
- Length: 4,911 mm (193 in)
- Width: 1,900 mm (75 in)
- Height: 1,875–1,899 mm (74–75 in)
- Curb weight: 2,772 kg (6,111 lb)

The Jeep Recon is a battery electric mid-size SUV that entered the market in 2026. Presented in a set of images in September 2022 alongside two other Jeep models, it is an off-road-oriented SUV that is heavily inspired by the Jeep Wrangler, and will be sold alongside it. A Wrangler variant was previously marketed as the Recon.

The Recon is based on Stellantis' STLA Large platform, with fully independent suspension. The vehicle will have removable doors, retractable roof, electronic locking differentials, Selec-Terrain traction management functions, skid plates, tow hooks, off-road-rated tires, and underbody protection. It will be produced in North America and will be available for the global market.

== Production and release ==
The Recon is scheduled for production at the Toluca Car Assembly plant in Toluca, Mexico, with manufacturing commencing in 2026 ahead of its arrival at North American dealerships on June 26, 2026, to be followed by other regions. Although Auto Express reported later that month that the Recon and Wagoneer S would no longer be sold in Europe as planned, Jeep later confirmed its plans to bring the Recon to Europe in 2027.

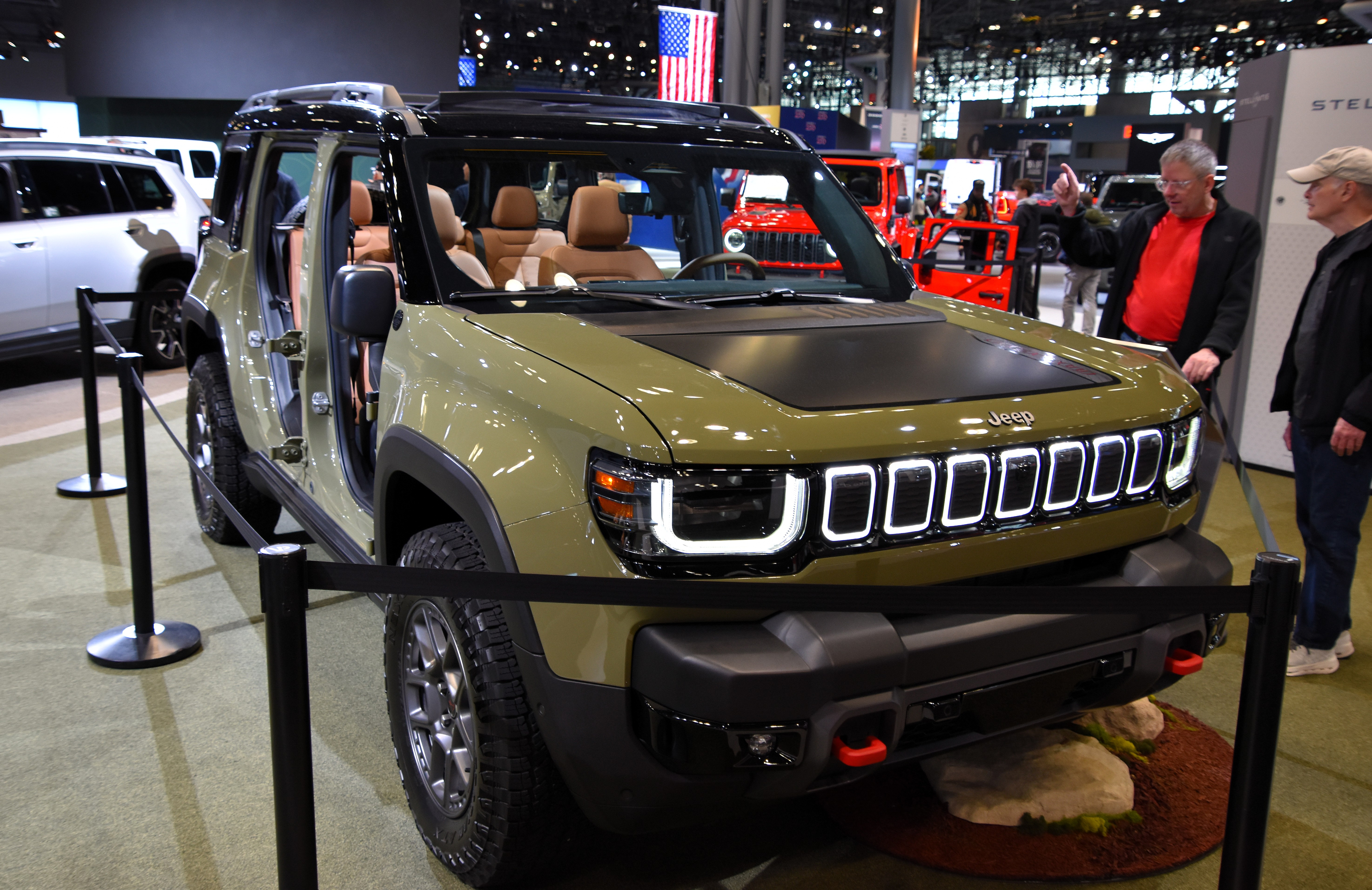
Recon Moab

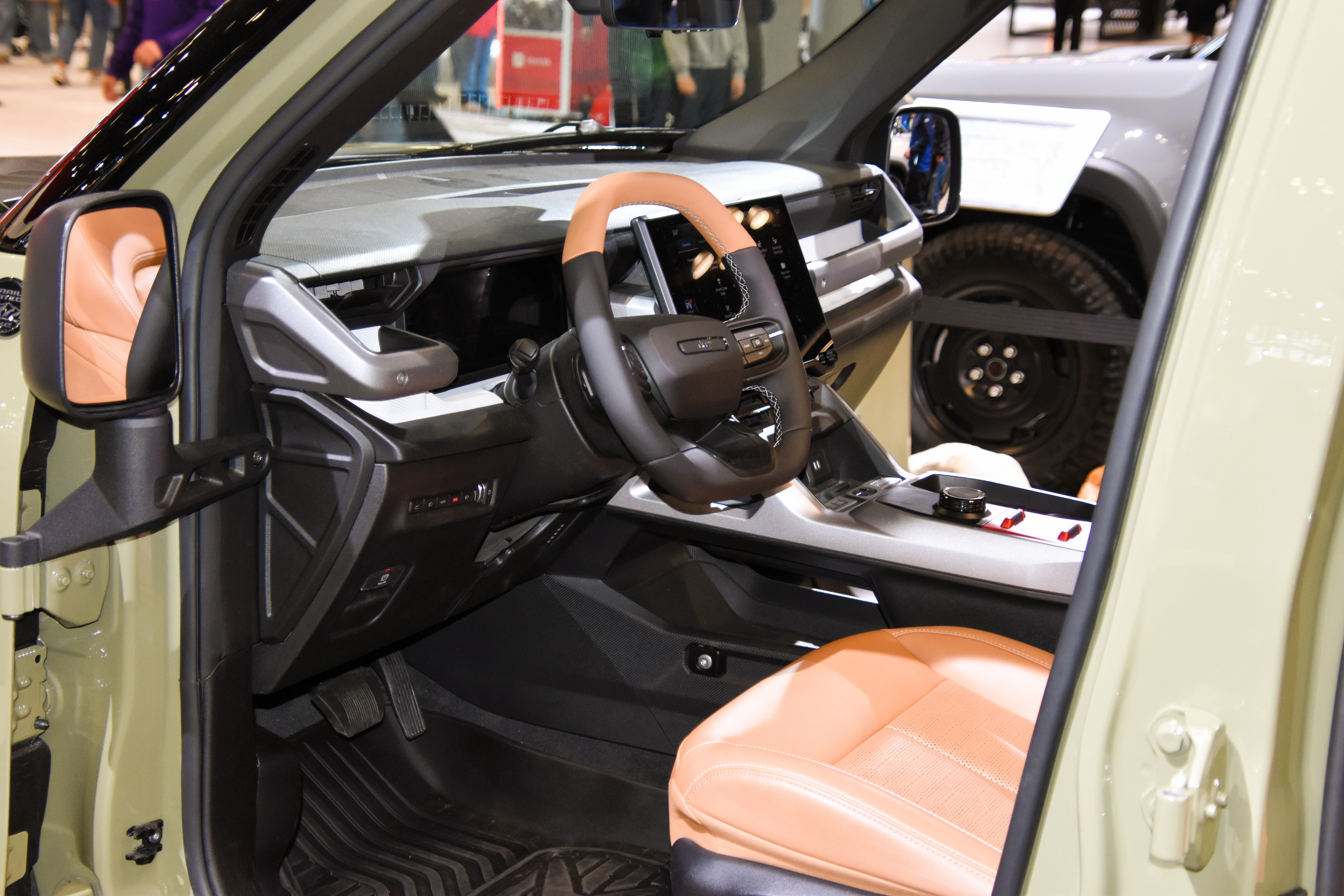
Interior

=== Design and features ===
The exterior uses an illuminated seven-slot grille, Wrangler-like square protruding taillights, bumpers with prominent tow hooks, and a swing-out tailgate carrying a standard full-size spare. Standard equipment is projected to include removable doors and a dual-pane power-opening sunroof, with an available Sky One-Touch Power Top. The Recon uses a frame-like design for the tiered center console and prominent grab handles with exposed rivets. A 12.3-inch digital gauge cluster and 14.5-inch central touchscreen are standard with on-screen climate controls complemented by volume and tuning knobs.

== Moab trim ==
The Moab trim uses most design elements used by the regular Recon. However it comes with wider fender flares, available rock rails, and Jeep badges with topographical etching.

=== Moab-exclusive features ===
The Moab trim has an electronic locking differential at the rear with 15:1 final drive ratio. The front differential is still an open differential. The locker is activated by a switch on the dashboard. Jeep's Selec-Terrain management system has a Rock mode exclusive to the Moab.

== Powertrain ==
The Recon uses a dual-motor, all-wheel-drive layout producing 650 horsepower and 620 pound-feet of torque. A 100 kWh battery and a rear locking differential comes standard. All trims besides the Moab get a range of 250 miles, the Moab gets a range of 230 miles. The battery of the Recon uses nickel manganese cobalt chemistry. It also uses a 400-volt architecture.
