= Jeep Wagoneer S =

Electric car by Jeep

Overview
- Manufacturer: Jeep (Stellantis)
- Production: 2024–present
- Model years: 2024–2025; 2027 (planned)
- Assembly: Mexico: Toluca (TCA)
- Designer: Ralph Gilles

Body and chassis
- Class: Mid-size crossover SUV
- Body style: 5-door SUV
- Layout: Dual-motor, four-wheel-drive
- Platform: STLA Large
- Chassis: Unibody
- Related: Jeep Cherokee (KM); Jeep Recon

Powertrain
- Electric motor: Launch Edition: two electric motors, combined: 600 hp (447 kW), 617 lb⋅ft (837 N⋅m); Limited: two electric motors, combined: 500 hp (373 kW), 520 lb⋅ft (705 N⋅m)
- Battery: 100.5 kWh/93.9 kWh (gross/net capacity) Li-ion
- Electric range: EPA: Launch Edition, Pirelli tires: 270 mi (435 km); Launch Edition, Falken tires: 303 mi (488 km)
- Plug-in charging: DC: 20%-80% in 23 minutes; AC: 11 kW

Dimensions
- Wheelbase: 2,870 mm (113.0 in)
- Length: 4,887 mm (192.4 in)
- Width: 1,899 mm (74.8 in)
- Height: 1,645 mm (64.8 in)
- Curb weight: 2,570 kg (5,666 lb)

The Jeep Wagoneer S is a battery electric mid-size crossover SUV produced and marketed under the Jeep brand. It was introduced in 2024 and is based on the STLA Large platform.

== History and overview ==
Rear view

The Wagoneer S was unveiled in 2024. It is a smaller vehicle than the Wagoneer, actually smaller in exterior dimensions than the current (2024) Grand Cherokee.

Multiple journalists made references to the Range Rover brand, either in a positive or a negative sense, when describing the vehicle. First units arrived at dealerships in January 2025, though they were 2024 model year, in the Launch Edition trim (the only trim initially available). Later, the Limited trim was added to the lineup.

Although first launched in North America, Jeep said the Wagoneer S would also go on sale in other markets, including Europe. However, in June 2026, Jeep later said that the Wagoneer S and Recon would no longer be sold in Europe as planned.

== Powertrain ==
The power output is 600 hp, coming from two electric motors. The vehicle accelerates from 0 to 60 mph in 3.4 seconds, which is faster than the Grand Cherokee Trackhawk. The gross battery capacity is slightly over 100 kWh.

As of 2025, Jeep added a new Limited trim level, which joined the existing Launch Edition. In this entry-level option, the two-motor electric powertrain delivers 500 hp (373 kW) and 520 lb-ft (705 N⋅m) of torque. The 600-hp powertrain (from the Launch Edition) can still be ordered as an extra option.

The addition of this new trim lowers the starting price of the Wagoneer S by $5,000, to $66,995 (including destination charges). Both the Limited and Launch Edition trims use the same two-motor, four-wheel-drive layout and both come with the same 100.5-kWh battery pack.

== Exterior, suspension, and brakes ==
The unibody SUV is made of galvanized steel and aluminum. 20-inch wheels are standard. The vehicle is equipped with a "giant" rear wing mounted to the tops of the D-pillars; its purpose is to give the vehicle an appropriate silhouette without sacrificing aerodynamics.

Despite four-wheel drive, the high torque of the motors, and selectable "snow" and "sand" drive modes, the Wagoneer S has a low ground clearance for a Jeep (6.4 inches), and Jeep mostly uses imagery of the Wagoneer S on paved roads, rather that off-road, in its advertising. A "Trailhawk" off-road variant was shown as a concept but has not entered production.

The suspension uses MacPherson struts in the front and a multi-link configuration in the rear, and is passive (as opposed to active or adaptive). The vehicle is equipped with ventilated disc brakes on all wheels; it is also equipped with regenerative braking, which can be set to one of two settings ("Min" or "Max").

== Interior ==
The instrument panel is a digital display, but is located in the traditional place (in front of the driver). In addition to this, there are two screens on the central console and one for the front passenger.

Reviewers were generally positive about the styling of the interior, and the quality of interior materials (including those who were unenthusiastic about the vehicle overall). Multiple color variants of the interior are available, including some in a two-color configuration (in one of the more conspicuous ones, commonly used in advertising for the Launch Edition, many interior elements are red including the seats, the bottom of the dashboard, and the lower portion of the door trim).

Both front and rear seats are heated and ventilated. 16-way power adjustable front seats (with a massage option) are available.

== Sales ==
| Calendar year | United States | Canada |
|---|---|---|
| 2024 | 231 | 13 |
| 2025 | 10,864 | 690 |
