= Jeep Cherokee (KM) =

Compact crossover SUV

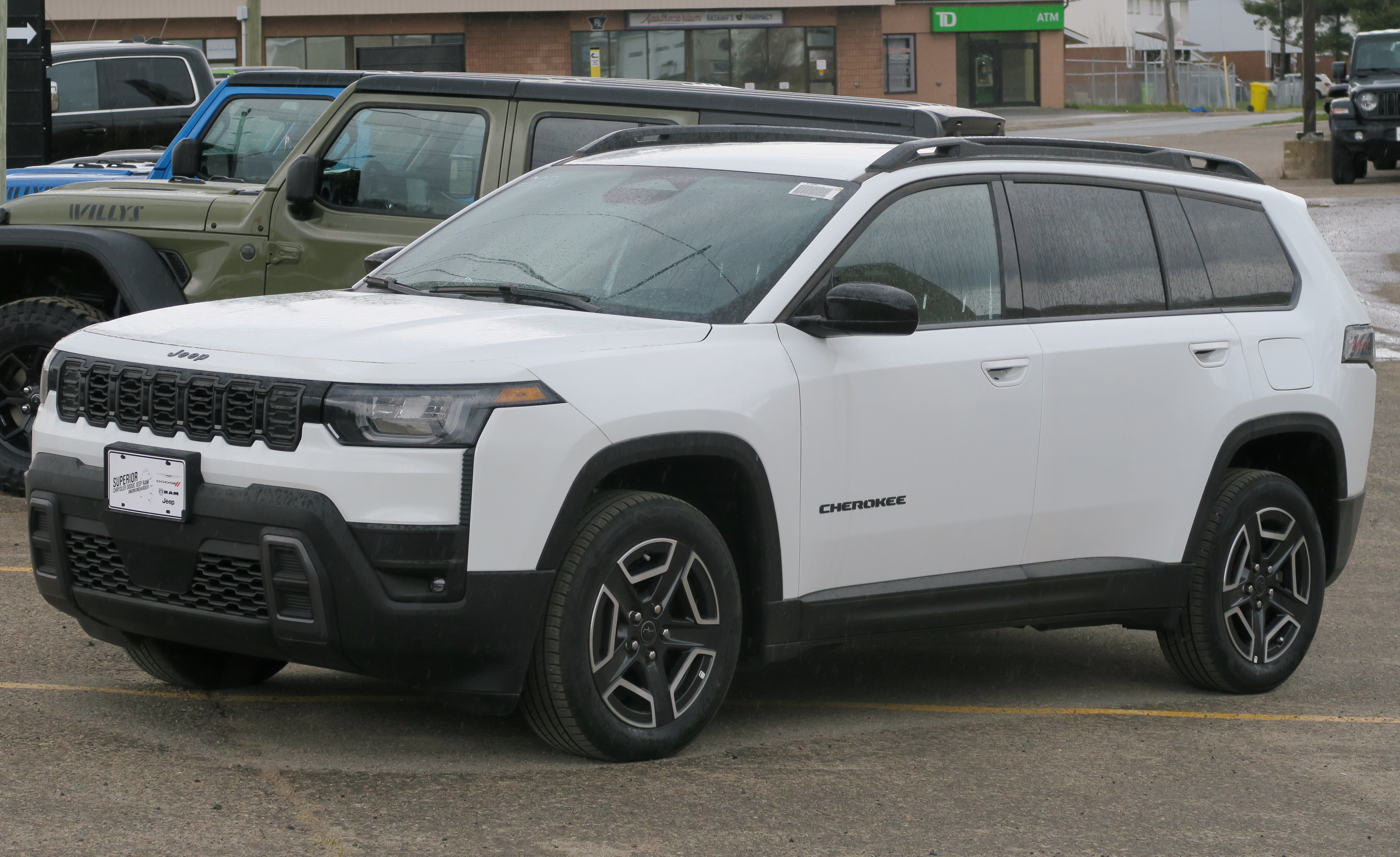
- 2026 Jeep Cherokee Laredo (Canada)

Overview
- Manufacturer: Jeep (Chrysler)
- Model code: KM
- Production: August 2025–present
- Model years: 2026–present
- Assembly: Mexico: Toluca (Toluca Car Assembly)

Body and chassis
- Class: Compact crossover SUV (Note: Attributed to multiple references:)
- Body style: 5-door SUV
- Layout: Front-engine, four-wheel-drive
- Platform: STLA Large Transverse
- Chassis: Unibody
- Related: Jeep Wagoneer S; Jeep Recon

Powertrain
- Engine: Gasoline hybrid: 1.6 L EP6CDTX turbo I4
- Transmission: eCVT (hybrid)

Dimensions
- Wheelbase: 113.0 in (2,870 mm)
- Length: 188.0 in (4,775 mm)
- Width: 74.7 in (1,897 mm)
- Height: 67.5 in (1,714 mm)
- Curb weight: 4,295 lb (1,948 kg)

Chronology
- Predecessor: Jeep Cherokee (KL)

The Jeep Cherokee (model code KM) is a compact crossover SUV manufactured and marketed by the Jeep marque of Chrysler, replacing the fifth-generation Jeep Cherokee (KL). It occupies a position between the smaller Jeep Compass and the larger Jeep Grand Cherokee in Jeep's global lineup.

== History ==
Jeep announced and teased the sixth-generation Cherokee (KM) on May 29, 2025, after a 2-year hiatus off sale. The Cherokee (KM) was officially unveiled on August 21, 2025, with deliveries scheduled to commenced in late 2025 for the 2026 model year. All model year 2026 Cherokee KM models will be built and assembled in the Toluca Car Assembly plant in Toluca, Mexico.

However on October 14, 2025, a Stellantis press release stated that as a part of a $13 billion U.S. investment, "Stellantis intends to invest more than $600 million to reopen the Belvidere Assembly Plant to expand production of the Jeep Cherokee and Jeep Compass for the U.S. market. With an initial production launch expected in 2027, these actions are anticipated to create around 3,300 new jobs."

== Specifications ==
The first unveiled powertrain is a 1.6-liter turbocharged gasoline hybrid paired with two electric motors for a combined output of 210 hp (157 kW; 213 PS), combined with a 1.08 kWh lithium-ion battery. The 1.6L is based on the latest iterations of the Prince engine originally designed by PSA Peugeot Citroën and BMW, and is produced at FCA's Dundee Engine Plant in Michigan. The sole transmission offered is a two-motor electric continuously variable transmission (eCVT) supplied by BluE Nexus, a Japanese supplier affiliated with Toyota. Suspension modules are supplied by ZF Chassis Modules Inc., a joint venture between ZF and Foxconn.

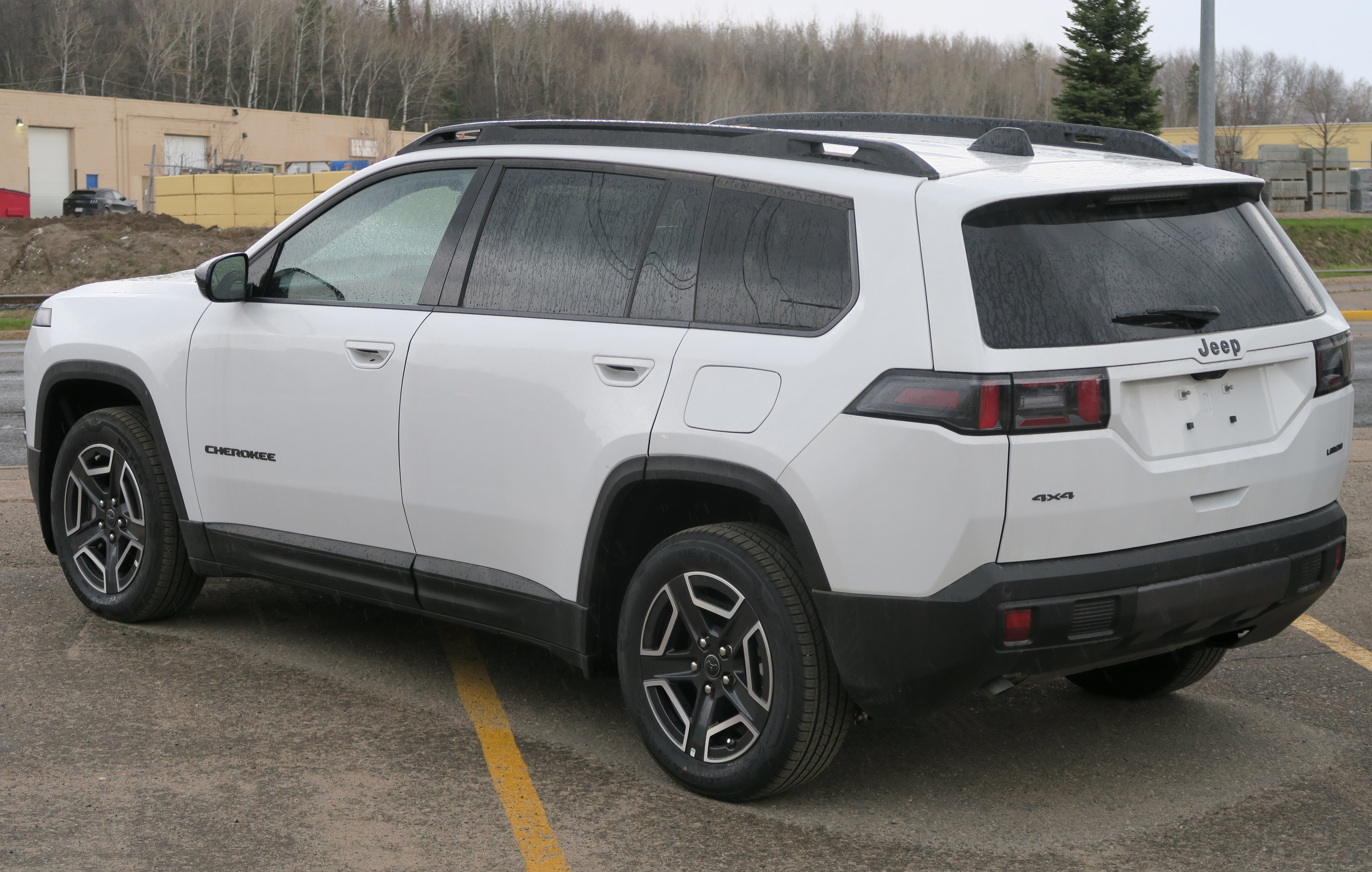
Rear view
