= FCA Giorgio platform =

Alfa Romeo Giorgio Platform

Overview
- Manufacturer: Alfa Romeo
- Production: 2015–present
- Assembly: Italy: Cassino Plant, Piedimonte San Germano (FR)

Body and chassis
- Class: Mid-size D-segment platform; Full-size E-segment platform
- Layout: Front-engine, rear-wheel-drive; Front-engine, all-wheel-drive
- Body styles: 5-door SUV; 4-door sedan/saloon

Chronology
- Predecessor: Chrysler WK/WK2 platform; Fiat Premium platform
- Successor: STLA Large Longitudinal

The FCA Giorgio Platform is an automobile platform made by Alfa Romeo since 2015, debuting in the Alfa Romeo Giulia. Although following the merger with Groupe PSA to form Stellantis in 2021 the future of the Giorgio platform became uncertain, the platform is currently being modified to better accommodate both plug-in hybrid, and electric power plants, with not only the hybrid Jeep Grand Cherokee and fully electric Maserati Gran Turismo using the Giorgio platform, but also the future Maserati Levante, and future Giorgio platform cars using the company's V6 engine. Some models however, will transition to the STLA Large Longitudinal platform, the evolution of Giorgio.

== Vehicles based on Giorgio platform ==
| Manufacturer | Model | Image | Production Years | Segment | Body(s) | Assembly line |
|---|---|---|---|---|---|---|
| Alfa Romeo | Giulia (952) | | 2015–present | D | Sedan | Italy: Cassino Plant, Piedimonte San Germano (FR) |
| Alfa Romeo | Stelvio | | 2016–present | D | Crossover SUV | Italy: Cassino Plant, Piedimonte San Germano (FR) |
| Maserati | Grecale | | 2022–present | D | Crossover SUV | Italy: Cassino Plant, Piedimonte San Germano (FR) |
| Maserati | GranTurismo | | 2023–present | S | Grand tourer | Italy: Mirafiori Plant, Turin (Piedmont), Modena |
| Maserati | GranCabrio | | 2024–present | S | Grand tourer | Italy: Mirafiori Plant, Turin (Piedmont), Modena |
| Jeep | Grand Cherokee L | | 2021–present | E | Crossover SUV | United States: Detroit, Michigan (Mack Avenue Assembly Complex) |
| Jeep | Grand Cherokee | | 2022–present | E | Crossover SUV | United States: Detroit, Michigan (Jefferson North Assembly Plant) |

== STLA Large Longitudinal ==
STLA Large is less a clean-sheet design than a single name spanning two inherited architectures. Its rear-wheel-drive branch (designated STLA Large Longitudinal) is derived from Giorgio and underpins the rear-drive replacements for the LX-platform cars, beginning with the Dodge Charger, together with the planned next-generation Alfa Romeo Giulia and Stelvio and the Maserati Levante. The transverse, front- and all-wheel-drive branch, STLA Large Transverse, is instead a continuation of FCA's earlier CUSW (Compact US Wide) platform. The two donor platforms began as very different designs, and that the intent behind grouping them under STLA Large is to broaden the engineering they share and to equip both with a common, newly developed electrical and electrification architecture.

=== Vehicles based on STLA Large Longitudinal platform ===
- Dodge Charger (2024)
- Alfa Romeo Stelvio (2028) II
- Alfa Romeo Giulia (2028) II
- Maserati Levante II (TBA)
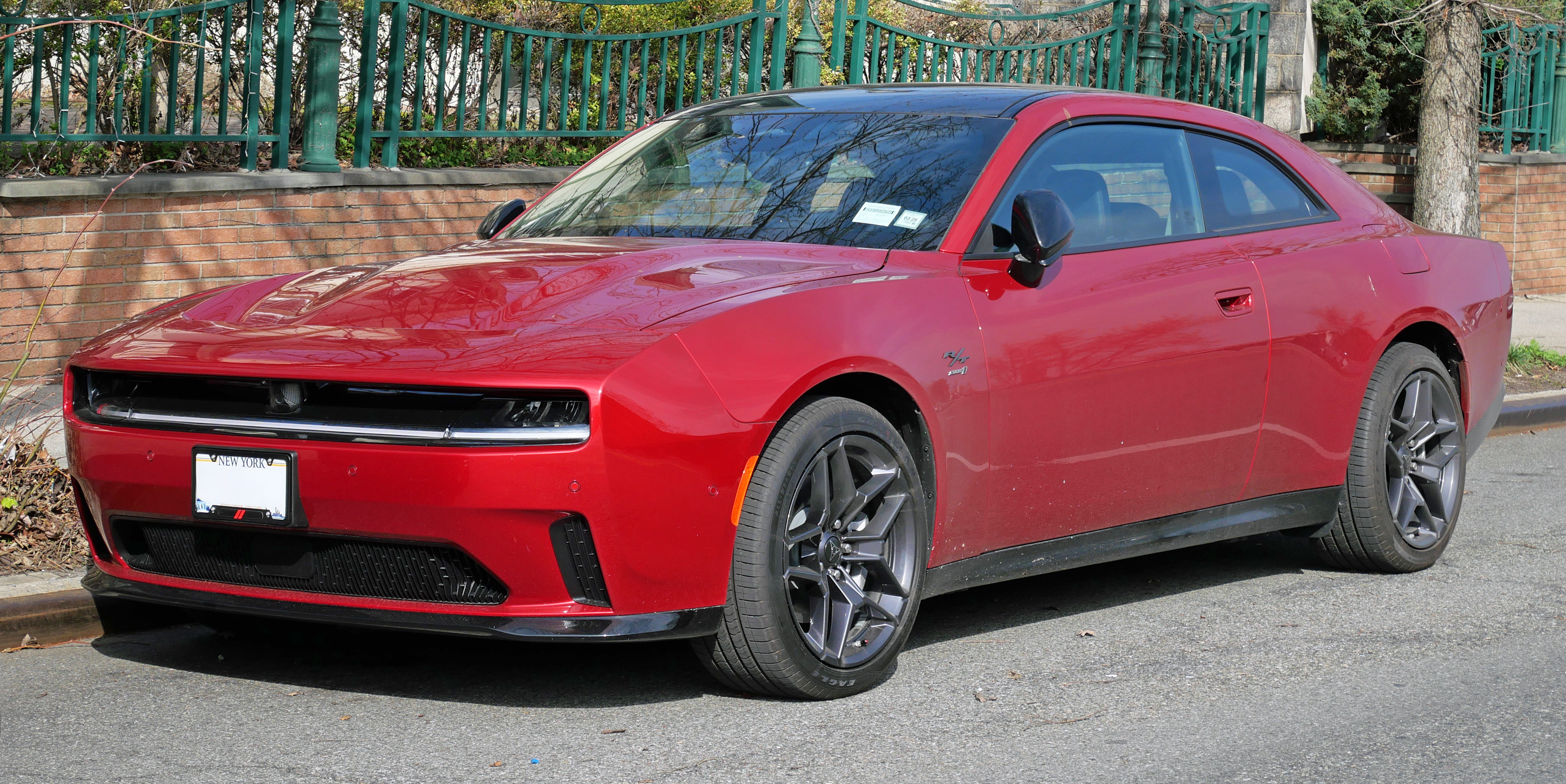
Dodge Charger (2024)
