= Ottimo =

Ottimo, Italian for "excellent" (cognate with English optimum), may refer to:

- Fiat Ottimo, a version of the Fiat Viaggio modified for the Chinese market
- L'Ottimo Commento della Divina Commedia ("The Excellent Commentary"), a commentary on Dante's Divine Comedy written by an anonymous Florentine circa 1333. (Not to be confused with the commentary of L'Anonimo Fiorentino, written circa 1400.) The Ottimo's first printed edition was edited by Alessandro Torri and published in Pisa, 1827–1829; a new critical edition edited by Giovanni Battista Boccardo, Massimiliano Corrado, and Vittorio Celotto was published in 2018.
