= Belvidere Assembly Plant =

Stellantis automobile assembly plant in Illinois

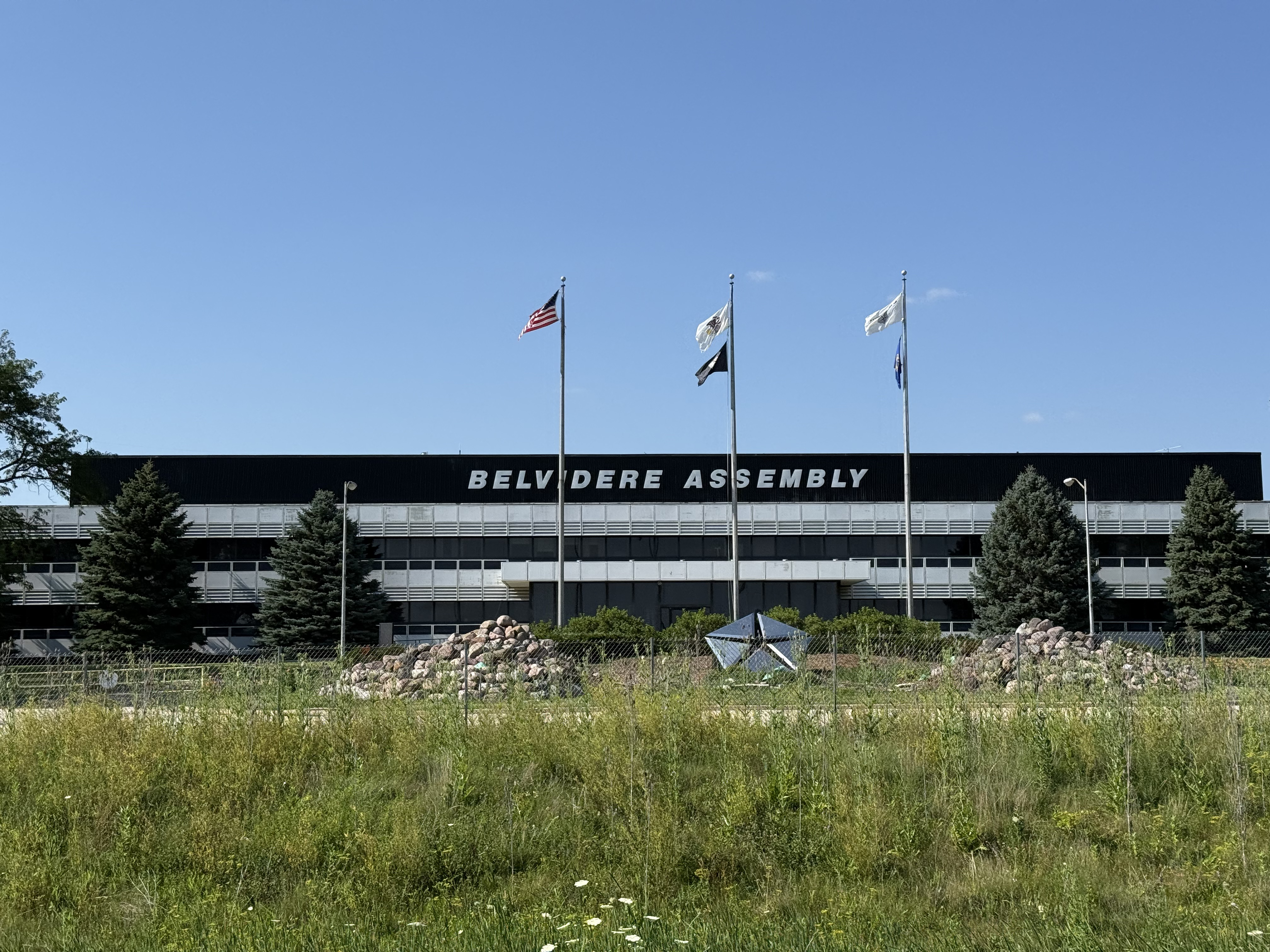
- Built: 1964–65
- Operated: July 1965
- Location: 3000 West Chrysler Drive; Belvidere, Illinois, United States
- Coordinates: 42.236°N 88.871°W
- Industry: Automotive
- Products: Automobiles
- Employees: 1,258 (2022)
- Area: 280 acres (1.1 km^{2})
- Volume: 5,300,000 sq ft (490,000 m^{2})
- Owners: Chrysler (1964–1998); DaimlerChrysler (1998–2007); Chrysler (2007–2014); Fiat Chrysler Automobiles (2014–2021); Stellantis (2021–present)

The Belvidere Assembly Plant (BVAP), a currently idled automobile production facility, is slated for production of the next-generation Jeep Cherokee in the second half of 2029. Stellantis North America, who own and operate the plant, announced in October 2025 that they are investing $600 million in restarting production at the facility. The factory opened in 1965 in Belvidere, Illinois, United States, and last assembled the Jeep Cherokee in 2023.

== History ==
The factory was built in 1964 and 1965 in the south part of Belvidere, Illinois, adjacent to U.S. Route 20. The first production line vehicle was made on 7 July 1965, assembling the new Chrysler C platform vehicles.

Less than 2 years after it opened, the plant was affected by an F4 tornado on 21 April 1967, which passed nearby. While the plant was not directly hit, 300 new cars and 100 employee cars were destroyed.

The Belvidere Assembly Plant is adjacent to the Chrysler-operated Belvidere Satellite Stamping Plant. The stamping plant produces sheet metal parts for the production line. The factory has 5,300,000 square feet (490,000 m^{2}) of floor space over 280 acres (1.1 km^{2}) of land, and had produced 5.9 million vehicles by the end of the 1993 model year.

In 2006, the factory became the first Chrysler plant to use a body shop consisting entirely of robotics. The 780 robots in the body shop could make necessary tool changes automatically, within a 47-second cycle time. The factory is capable of building three models of vehicles as well as test-building a fourth vehicle.

The Simulation (SIM) Room comprises 38,000 square feet (3,500 m^{2}) of the factory and is used to create a miniature production process and to test the layout of job stations, and creating standard work instructions. A two-foot grid is painted on the floor to measure dimensions and employee walk-time during simulated production and efficiency modeling.

In October 2010, it was announced that $600 million were to be invested into the Belvidere Assembly Plant in preparation for 2012 model year vehicles to be built there. The Dodge Dart (PF) was announced in December 2011 to be built at the plant.

On 9 December 2022, Stellantis announced that Belvidere Assembly would be placed into an "indefinite closure" effective 28 February 2023. The Belvidere site was a point of contention in 2023 United Auto Workers strike, with the United Auto Workers and Stellantis negotiating a future use for the site. The resulting contract, announced on 28 October 2023, includes the reopening of the plant in early 2025, reportedly to assemble a new mid-size Ram Dakota pickup truck. A planned expansion would also add an electric vehicle battery plant, creating 1,100 new jobs at the facility.

On 31 March 2023, the plant was struck by a second tornado, which removed two air handlers from the roof of the plant, causing a gas leak (the same tornado also caused the collapse of Belvidere's Apollo Theatre).

On 9 November 2023, President Joe Biden visited Belvidere and held a speech with local UAW leaders on the reopening of the plant.

In August 2024, Stellantis has said that it was delaying investments in the plant.

In January 2025, Stellantis announced that it would restart the plant, which will assemble a currently unnamed new Ram mid-size truck model that is scheduled to release in 2027.

In October 2025, Stellantis announced to move production of the Dakota pickup to Toledo; the Jeep Compass, and Cherokee, to Belvidere. Production start was further delayed to 2027. The Compass was previously committed to Brampton, Canada during the contract renewal with Unifor. The Brampton plant was undergoing retooling at the time.

As of November 2025, Stellantis plans to begin pilot production and testing of the Jeep Compass line in December 2026 with sellable units starting production in December 2027. Jeep Cherokee production will start in November 2028.

As of August 2026, the automaker expects to take an additional year to retool the plant and pilot production of the Jeep Cherokee is further delayed to the first half of 2028, volume production to the second half of 2029. The company moved the vehicle to be built at Belvidere to the STLA One vehicle platform. The current generation Jeep Cherokee is produced at Toluca, Mexico. At the time, the company refused to confirm to the Free Press if Belvidere would still build the Compass.

== Labor ==
In 1985, there were around 4,000 employees working at the plant. At the start of the Neon car production, there were 3,250 hourly and 250 salaried employees working as of 10 November 1993.

At the start of 2007 model year Jeep Compass production, 2,650 employees were working at the factory, up from 1,700 in 2005 when one shift of employees was in place. However, the third shift, which was first instituted in 2006, was discontinued in 2008. The plant was idled during the Chrysler bankruptcy filing and became a one-shift operation from July 2009. A temporary second shift was added by October 2009. In May 2019, Chrysler laid off 1,403 employees after the "C" shift was eliminated.

Production of vehicles dropped from 263,521 in 2008 to 84,609 in 2009.

The workforce is represented by the United Auto Workers, Local 1268 and 1761. There have been two UAW-ordered strikes in the plant's history. In 1973, there was a nine-day strike over the right to turn down overtime, pension funding, and health and safety measures. In 1981, there was a nine-day strike to receive pay parity with Ford and GM workers. Chrysler proposed eliminating several job classifications so workers could be required to perform more than one task.

In 2009, the future of the plant was uncertain. Haig Stoddard, a Global Insight analyst, cited the plant as one of three plants that had been considered in a plan to close one plant.

== Awards ==
In 2005, the factory was the recipient of Plant Engineering's Top Plant Award for efficient turnover in the changeover from Neon production to Caliber production.

The Chrysler Group has been awarded the American College of Occupational and Environmental Medicine's (ACOEM) Corporate Health Achievement Award after a tour of the plant.

The plant received a Green Cross for Safety award from the National Safety Council for 2004.

The J.D. Power Award for Manufacturing Quality (Bronze rating) was given to the plant in 2020.

== Vehicles produced ==
=== Future Products ===
Stellantis assigned the Jeep Cherokee (KM) and Jeep Compass (J4U) to Belvidere Assembly, a 600 million dollar planned investment.The company moved the Jeep Cherokee to be built by the plant to STLA One vehicle platform, with pilot production postponed to 2028.

On Stellantis Capital Markets on May 21, 2026, as part of the company's FaSTLane 2030, Stellantis CEO Antonio Filosa announced that production version of the Chrysler Airflow SUV will be produced at Belvidere Assembly along side it’s smaller sibling the upcoming Dodge GLH SUV and the North American-spec next generation beginning in late 2027 for the 2028 model year, with the Jeep Compass (J4D) following in mid-2028 for the 2029 model year, which will now join the Airflow and GLH on the new STLA One platform. Also the Cherokee (KM) will be staying permanently in Toluca, Mexico and continue to be sold as the “Cherokee Classic” with the next-gen Cherokee (KN) joining the STLA One platform in late 2029 for the 2030 model year.

=== Past ===
Some of the past models made at the plant included:

- Dodge Polara/Plymouth Fury/Chrysler Town & Country (station wagon)
- Dodge Omni/Plymouth Horizon (1978–1987)
- Dodge Charger (L-body) (1982–1987)
- Chrysler New Yorker (1988–1993)
- Dodge Dynasty (1988–1993)
- Chrysler Imperial (1990–1993)
- Chrysler Newport (1961–1981)
- Chrysler New Yorker Fifth Avenue (1990–1993)
- Plymouth Neon (1994–2001)
- Dodge Neon (1994–2005)
- Dodge Caliber (2007–2012)
- Dodge Dart (1965–1968; 2013–2016)
- Jeep Compass (2007–2016)
- Jeep Patriot (2007–2016)
- Jeep Cherokee (2017–2023)
