= Dodge Dart (PF) =

Compact car produced by Chrysler

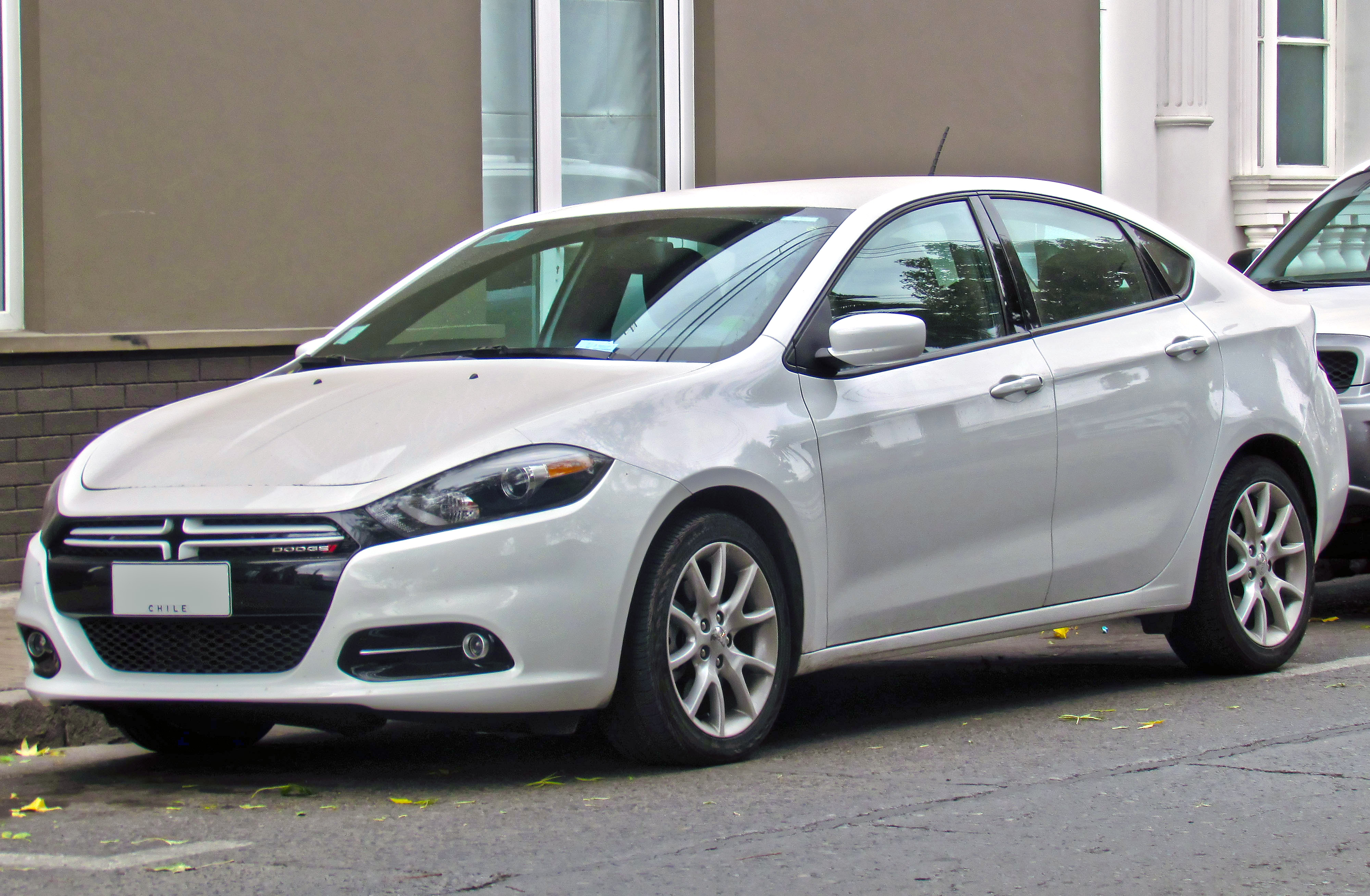
- 2014 Dodge Dart Rallye

Overview
- Manufacturer: Dodge (Note: Chrysler Group LLC (2013–2014); FCA US LLC (2014–2016))
- Also called: Fiat Viaggio (China); Fiat Ottimo (China, hatchback)
- Production: May 2012 – September 2016; June 2012 – March 2017 (China)
- Model years: 2012–2016 (China); 2013–2016
- Assembly: United States: Belvidere, Illinois (FCA Belvidere Assembly Plant); China: Changsha, Hunan (GAC Fiat Chrysler)
- Designer: Tim Doyle, Michael Nicholas; Roberto Giolito (Ottimo)

Body and chassis
- Class: Compact car (C)
- Body style: 4-door sedan; 5-door hatchback (Fiat Ottimo)
- Layout: Front-engine, front-wheel drive
- Platform: Compact US Wide
- Related: Alfa Romeo Giulietta Chrysler 200 (UF)

Powertrain
- Engine: Gasoline: 1.4 L Fiat FIRE I4 turbo; 2.0 L GEMA/Chrysler Tigershark I4; 2.4 L GEMA/Chrysler Tigershark I4
- Transmission: 5-speed manual (China); 6-speed FPT C635 manual 6-speed FPT C635 DCT; 7-speed FPT C725 DCT (China); 6-speed Powertech 6F24 automatic

Dimensions
- Wheelbase: 106.4 in (2,703 mm); 106.6 in (2,708 mm) (Viaggio/Ottimo)
- Length: 183.9 in (4,671 mm); 184.2 in (4,679 mm) (Fiat Viaggio); 178.9 in (4,544 mm) (Fiat Ottimo)
- Width: 72.0 in (1,829 mm); 72.8 in (1,849 mm) (Viaggio/Ottimo)
- Height: 57.7 in (1,466 mm); 57.9 in (1,471 mm) (Fiat Viaggio); 58.1 in (1,476 mm) (Fiat Ottimo)
- Curb weight: 3,186–3,348 lb (1,445–1,519 kg)

Chronology
- Predecessor: Dodge Caliber; Dodge Avenger sedan
- Successor: Dodge Neon (third generation) (Mexico)

The Dodge Dart is a front-engine, front-wheel drive, four-door compact sedan that was manufactured and marketed by then FCA US LLC, a subsidiary of Fiat Chrysler Automobiles. The automobile debuted at the 2012 North American International Auto Show in Detroit, Michigan. In some non-US markets, the Dodge Dart is sold as the Fiat Viaggio.

Reviving a nameplate used by Dodge in model years 1960–1976 for a succession of full-size, mid-size, and finally compact models, the Dart (PF) was the brand's first compact sedan since 2005, when the Neon was discontinued.

== History ==
A mini MPV concept car was designed and developed by Chrysler and revealed in 2006 as the Dodge Hornet to be sold exclusively in Europe. It was Dodge's first attempt at building a vehicle of this small size, and the car was expected to be released in 2010. However, this concept was dropped because of the Great Recession and the restructuring of the Chrysler Group.

After Chrysler's merger with Fiat in late 2010, the small Dodge Hornet concept took on a new form to share a Fiat platform. In December 2011, the automaker announced the new small sedan would be called the Dodge Dart to replace the Dodge Caliber.

The Dart was initially scheduled for U.S. dealership sales beginning in late June 2012. The Aero model began production in the third quarter of 2012. The GT began production in the second quarter of 2013.

On March 4, 2014, at the Geneva Motor Show, Sergio Marchionne commented on the possible production of a hatchback model for the North American market, saying, "our North American consumers will be gradually offered alternatives for same or close to expense" and that potential buyers might account for either Fiat 500X or Jeep Renegade.

== Features ==
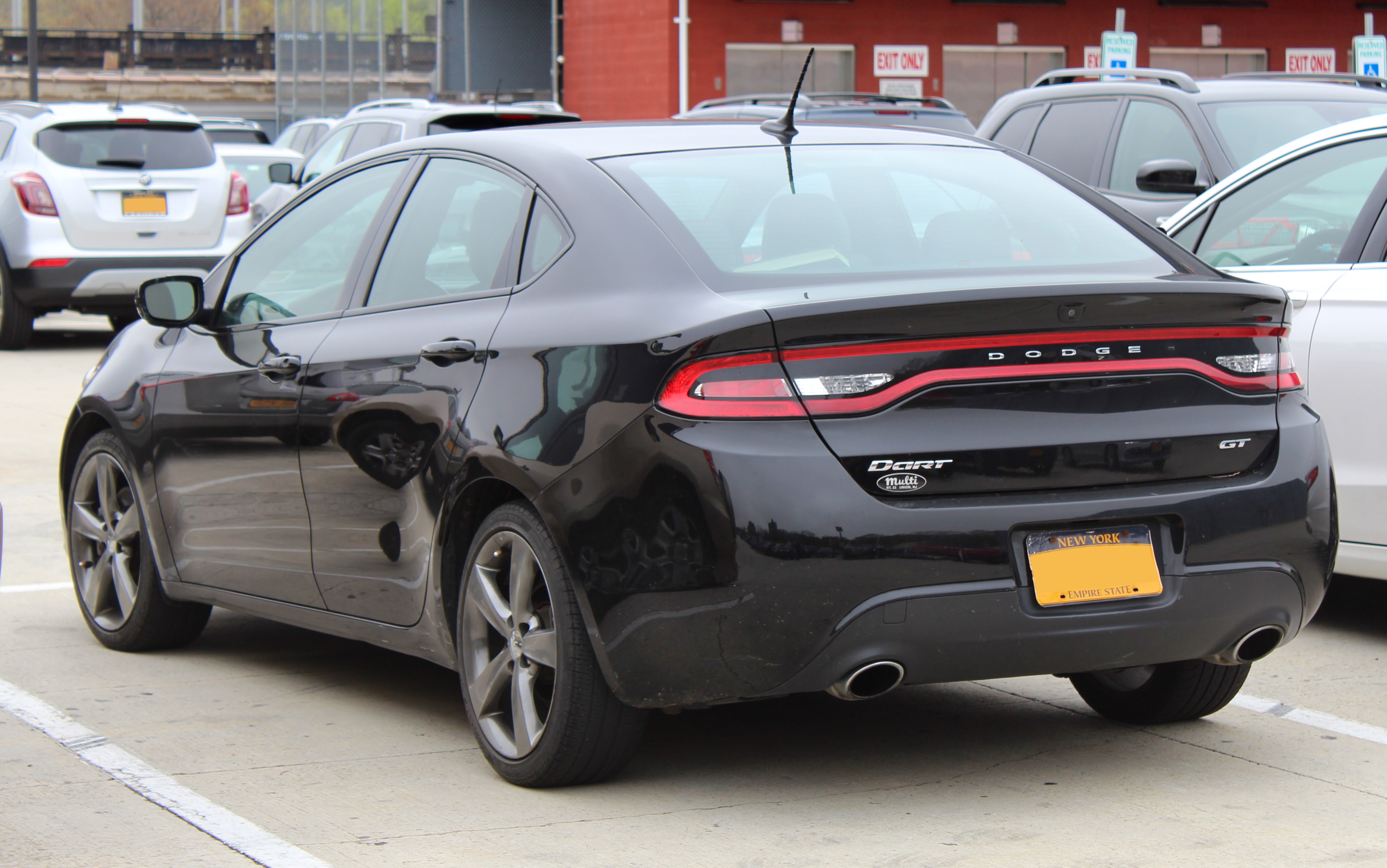
Dodge Dart GT (rear)

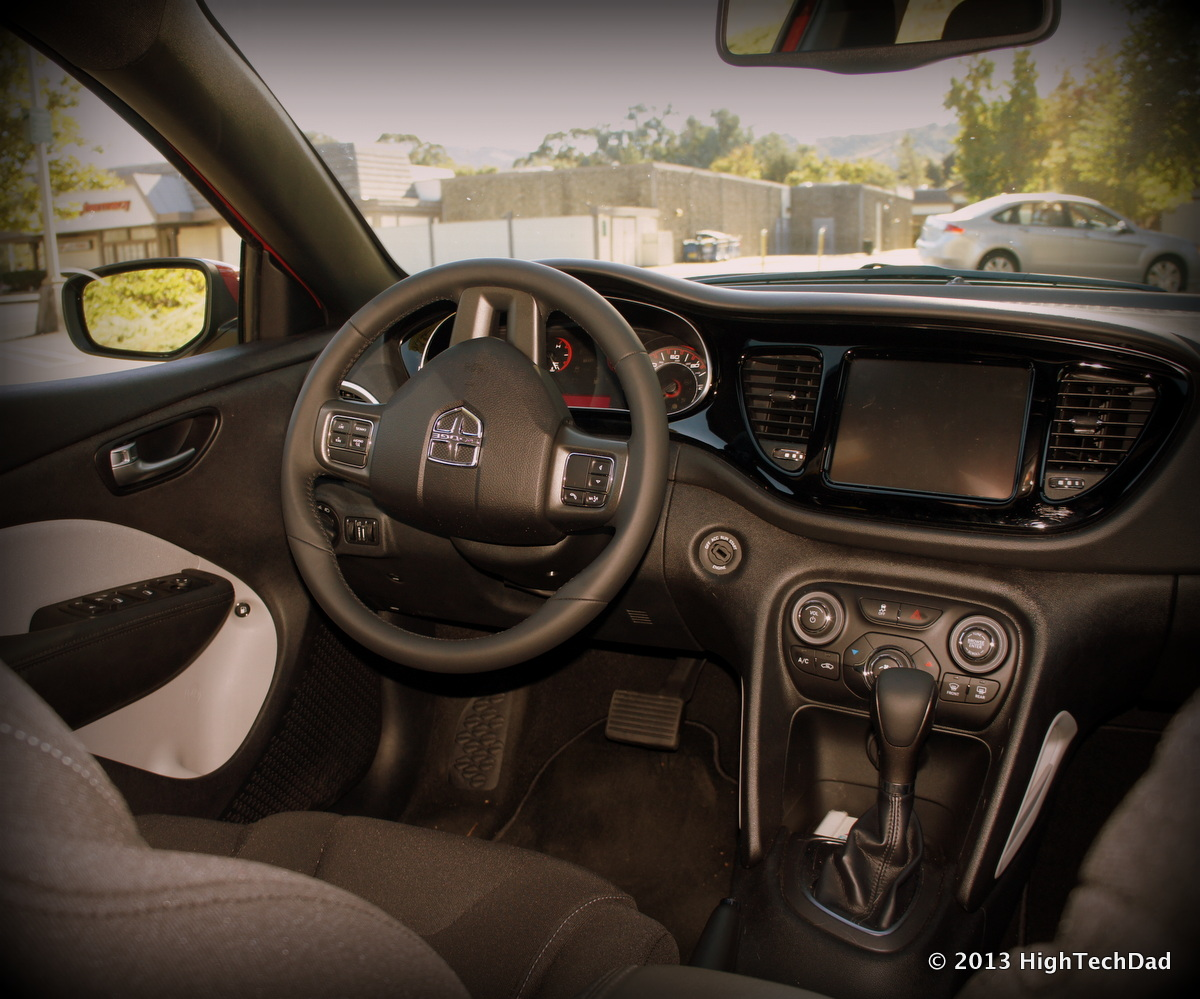
Interior

The Dart had three transmission options, and available electrically boosted power steering that has a sensor and electric motor mounted to the rack itself. Interiors were customizable with 12 different color/fabric combinations, optional ambient lighting systems, and optional leather seats. The dashboard featured a 7-inch (178 mm) color TFT display with trip computer and navigation system. Storage included a glove box, center console with auxiliary electronics jacks, and console map pockets. Trunk volume is 13.1 cu ft (370 L).

In 2014, all Darts aside from the SE got standard U Connect Bluetooth telephone for 2014. A Blacktop Package, featuring black alloy wheels and black accents, for all models except SE and Limited, as well as a California Appearance Package for the SXT and Limited, both became available for 2014.

The Dart was the first compact sedan to feature a rear obstacle detection system and blind spot monitoring. A Dart version managing an unadjusted combined driving 40 miles per US gallon (5.9 L/100 km; 48 mpg_{‑imp}) made it possible for Fiat to acquire an additional 5% share of Chrysler Group.

The Dart uses a similar suspension system to that of the Alfa Romeo Giulietta: in front it has independent MacPherson struts, coil springs, twin-tube dampers, and stabilizer bar while in the rear it has independent multilink suspension. According to Dart chief engineer the suspension is slightly softened compared with the Alfa, "We've taken a little edge off it," "It's a blast to toss around."

== Models ==
The Dart came in several different trim levels during its four-year production run, each model having its own distinct level of standard and optional equipment:

=== SE ===
The SE was the base Dart model between 2013 and 2016. It offered the following standard equipment: 160-horsepower 2.0L Tigershark I4 engine, six-speed manual transmission, AM/FM stereo with single-disc CD/MP3 player with auxiliary and USB inputs, four-speaker audio system, heater (no air conditioning), power windows and door locks, cloth seating surfaces, dual manually-adjustable front bucket seats, split-folding rear bench seat, full instrumentation, fifteen-inch black-painted steel wheels with plastic wheel covers, and black door handles and side mirrors. Additional options available for this model included a SE Popular Equipment Group that added equipment such as air conditioning, U Connect Bluetooth with streaming audio, SiriusXM Satellite Radio, a six-speaker audio system, keyless entry, and exterior color-keyed side mirrors. A six-speed automatic transmission was also available for this trim level. In mid-2016, the SE trim level of the Dodge Dart was discontinued.

=== SXT ===
The SXT was the "mid-level" trim level of the Dart between 2013 and 2016. It added the following equipment to the base SE trim level: sixteen-inch aluminum-alloy wheels (2014 and newer models), U Connect Bluetooth with streaming audio, SiriusXM Satellite Radio, a six-speaker audio system (four-speaker audio system after mid-2016), air conditioning, keyless entry, and exterior color-keyed door handles and side mirrors. Additional options for this trim level included sixteen-inch aluminum-alloy wheels (standard on 2014 and newer models), the U Connect 8.4-inch touch-screen infotainment system, a nine-speaker, 506-watt Alpine premium amplified surround-sound audio system, remote start, a six-speed automatic transmission, a 160-horsepower 1.4 L MultiAir Turbocharged I4 engine, the Rallye Package, a seven-inch TFT instrument cluster display, and a power-adjustable front driver's bucket seat. During the final few months of Dodge Dart production, this model was known as the SXT Sport, and with the discontinuation of the previously base-model SE trim level, became the base trim level of the Dodge Dart.

=== Limited ===
The Limited was the "up-level" Dart trim level between 2013 and 2016. It added the following equipment to the "mid-level" SXT trim level: seventeen-inch aluminum-alloy wheels, the U Connect 8.4-inch infotainment system, a power-adjustable front driver's bucket seat, Nappa luxury leather-trimmed seating surfaces (2014 and later models), dual heated front seats, a seven-inch TFT instrument cluster display, a six-speed automatic transmission, a 160-horsepower 1.4 L MultiAir Turbocharged I4 engine, a 184-horsepower 2.4 L Tigershark Inline Four-Cylinder engine (standard on later models), seventeen-inch polished aluminum-alloy wheels, GPS navigation, Keyless Enter-'n'-Go with push-button start, a nine-speaker, 506-watt Alpine premium amplified surround-sound audio system, and Nappa luxury leather-trimmed seating surfaces (optional on 2013 models only). In mid-2016, the Limited trim level of the Dodge Dart was discontinued.

=== Aero ===
The Aero trim level of the Dart, available from 2013 until 2016 and based on the "mid-level" SXT trim level, was focused on fuel economy, and added the following features to that model: U Connect 8.4-inch touch screen infotainment system and 160-horsepower 1.4 L MultiAir I4 engine. Additional features on this trim level included aluminum-alloy wheels, a six-speed dual-clutch automatic transmission, and remote start. The Aero trim level of the Dodge Dart achieved an EPA fuel economy rating of 41 MPG Highway. In mid-2016, the Aero trim level of the Dodge Dart was discontinued.

=== GT ===
The GT was the top-of-the-line Dart trim level between 2013 and 2016. It added the following equipment to the Limited trim level: Nappa luxury leather-trimmed seating surfaces, Keyless Enter-'n'-Go with push-button start, eighteen-inch Granite Crystal-finished aluminum-alloy wheels, a nine-speaker, 506-watt Alpine premium amplified surround-sound audio system and a 184-horsepower 2.4 L Tigershark I4 engine. Additional options on this trim level included eighteen-inch Hyper Black-finished aluminum-alloy wheels, a six-speed automatic transmission, and a remote start. During the final few months of Dodge Dart production, this model was known as the GT Sport.

== Engines ==
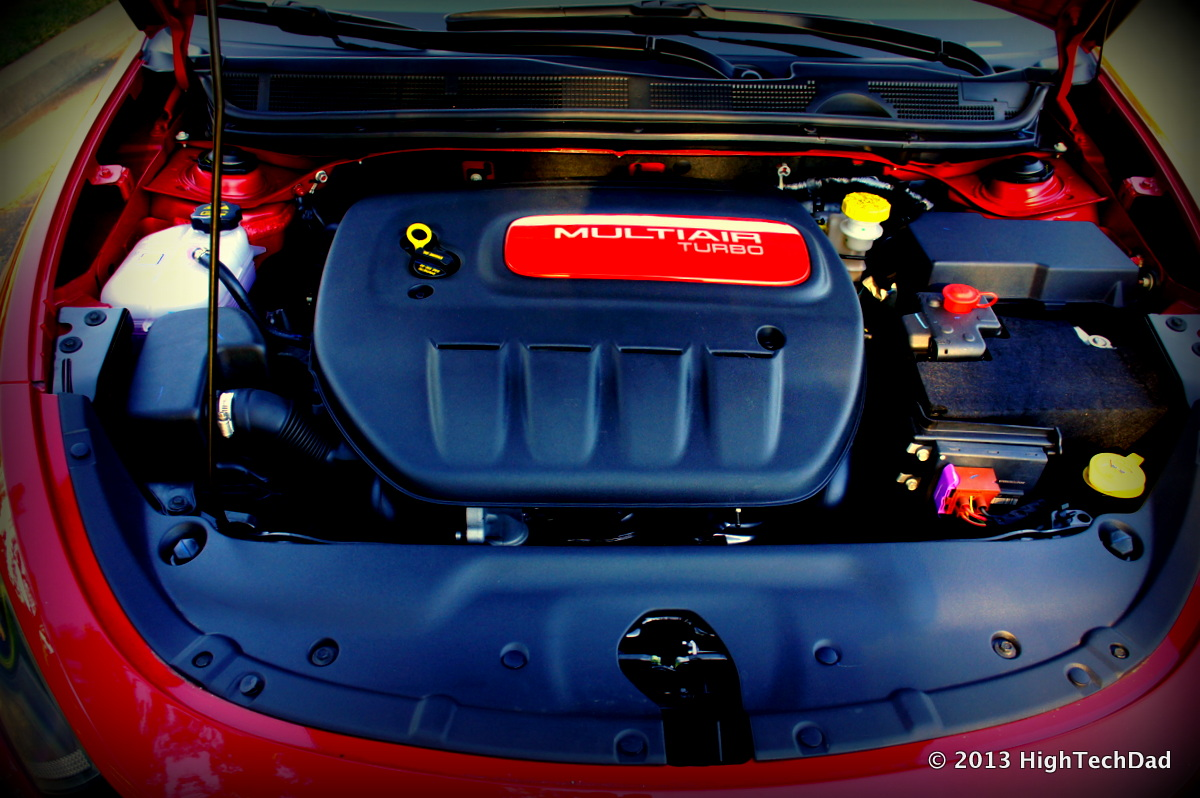
Dodge Dart Rallye engine bay

The Dart had three engine options: a Tigershark 16-valve 2 L engine, a "Tigershark" 16-valve 2.4 L MultiAir 2 four-cylinder engine, and a 16-valve 1.4 L MultiAir Intercooled turbo engine used also in the Alfa Romeo Giulietta. That engine has been retuned for American use (changing the required grade of oil to one widely available in the U.S. and Canada, for example) in the Fiat 500 Abarth. The 1.4T Dart also will have more torque than the Abarth. A 6-speed manual transmission was available with all engines. A six-speed automatic was optional on the 2.0 L and 2.4 L engines while a six-speed dual-clutch transmission was available on the 1.4 L turbo version. Marchionne stated that a 9-speed automatic would be available sometime later, but the Dart ended production before it could be added. All Dart engines were built in Dundee, Michigan.

In 2014, the Dart SXT and Limited included a 2.4 L I4 engine with increased horsepower ratings, while making the 2.0 L Tigershark I4 engine only available in the base SE model. The 2.4 L I4 engine was offered in late 2013 with the introduction of the Dart GT model. The Dart Aero, Rallye, SXT, and Limited models are the only models available with the 1.4 L MultiAir turbocharged I4 engine.

Model	Engine type	Displacement	Power	Torque	Fuel consumption (City/Highway) EPA est.	Notes
SE, SXT (2013), SXT Sport, Rallye, Limited (2013)	Chrysler 2.0 L I4 Tigershark	1,999 cc (122 cu in)	160 bhp (119 kW) at 6,400 rpm	148 lb⋅ft (201 N⋅m) at 4,600 rpm	25 mpg_{‑US} (9.4 L/100 km; 30 mpg_{‑imp})/36 mpg_{‑US} (6.5 L/100 km; 43 mpg_{‑imp})	-
SXT (2013), Rallye, Limited (2014)	Fiat 1.4 L I4 FIRE MultiAir Turbo	1,368 cc (83.5 cu in)	160 bhp (119 kW) at 5,500 rpm	184 lb⋅ft (249 N⋅m) at 2,500 rpm	27 mpg_{‑US} (8.7 L/100 km; 32 mpg_{‑imp})/39 mpg_{‑US} (6.0 L/100 km; 47 mpg_{‑imp})	-
Aero	Fiat 1.4 L I4 FIRE MultiAir Turbo	1,368 cc (83.5 cu in)	160 bhp (119 kW) at 5,500 rpm	184 lb⋅ft (249 N⋅m) at 2,500 rpm	27 mpg_{‑US} (8.7 L/100 km; 32 mpg_{‑imp})/41 mpg_{‑US} (5.7 L/100 km; 49 mpg_{‑imp})	-
SXT, Limited, GT, GT Sport	Chrysler 2.4 L I4 Tigershark MultiAir 2	2,360 cc (144 cu in)	184 bhp (137 kW) at 6,250 rpm	171 lb⋅ft (232 N⋅m) at 4,800 rpm	23 mpg_{‑US} (10 L/100 km; 28 mpg_{‑imp})/33 mpg_{‑US} (7.1 L/100 km; 40 mpg_{‑imp})	-

*Source:

Engine and transmission configurations
Engine model	Years	Transmissions
Tigershark 16-valve 2.0-liter four-cylinder	2012–16	6-speed manual, 6-speed automatic (Powertech 6F24)
Fiat 1.4-liter MultiAir Intercooled Turbo	2012–16	6-speed manual, 6-speed dual dry clutch
2.4-liter Tigershark MultiAir 2	2012–16	6-speed manual, 6-speed automatic (Powertech 6F24)

== Safety ==
The Dart is equipped with numerous safety features, such as: brake assist, brake-lock differential, rainy brake support, hydraulic boost compensation, electronic stability control, traction control, anti-lock braking system, electronic roll mitigation, hill-start assist, trailer-sway control, rear backup camera and rear park assist. The Dart has 10 airbags standard; it also has a reactive head-restraint system for the front seats, and other available systems are blind-spot monitoring and rear cross path detection. The Giulietta, on which the Dart is based, has achieved the highest rating for a compact car in the Euro NCAP tests.

The Insurance Institute for Highway Safety (IIHS) gave the 2013 Dart a five-star safety rating in the frontal offset barrier, rollover, and side impact crash tests. The Dart also earned an IIHS Top Safety Pick for 2012.

Insurance Institute for Highway Safety (IIHS) was safety tested by IIHS in 2013

IIHS Dodge Dart scores:
Small overlap front:driver-side	Acceptable
Moderate overlap front	Good
Side	Good
Roof strength	Good
Head restraints & seats	Good

NHTSA 2013 Dodge Dart:
Overall:	5/5 stars
Frontal driver:	5/5 stars
Frontal passenger:	5/5 stars
Side driver:	5/5 stars
Side passenger:	5/5 stars
Side Pole Driver:	5/5 stars
Rollover:	/ 10.70%

== Motorsports and SRT ==
At the New York International Auto Show in 2012, a Dodge Dart turbo four-wheel drive rally car was shown. The blue-and-white SRT-badged car entered the 2012 Global RallyCross Championship, driven by four-time Rally America champion Travis Pastrana and his teammates.

Based on the 2013 Dodge Dart, it included a 2.0 L 4-cylinder, 16-valve turbocharged engine rated at 600 hp (447 kW) and over 550 lb⋅ft (746 N⋅m) of torque, and a Sadev four-wheel drive transmission. The Dart continued in the 2013 Global RallyCross Championship season, but after Pastrana placed 10th in the driver's standings for both years, Dodge pulled out of the series and he returned to Subaru Rally Team USA in 2014.

The Dart SRT 4 was originally planned for production starting in December 2016, based on the 2014 five-year plan of the Fiat Chrysler Automobiles (FCA) group. However, due to the decision to end production of the Dart, due to poor sales numbers, the SRT 4 version was canceled.

== Fiat models ==
The Fiat Viaggio ("journey", "voyage" in English), also called fēi xíang (菲翔), is a sedan version of the Dodge Dart for the Chinese market, designed by the Fiat Group Style Centre in Turin, Italy. A 1.4 L T-Jet engine producing 120 PS (88 kW) or 150 PS (110 kW), was available paired to a 5-speed manual or 6-speed dual clutch gearbox for 2012 and 2013. A 7-speed Dual Dry Clutch gearbox was standard from 2015 to 2017.

The Viaggio was unveiled at the 2012 Beijing International Auto Show, and went on sale in the third quarter 2012, with delivery by the end of 2012.

The Fiat Ottimo is a 5-door hatchback version of the Viaggio for the Chinese market. It was introduced at 2013 Guangzhou Auto Show and was designed by Roberto Giolito. The Ottimo offers the same engine and gearboxes that comes standard in the Viaggio.

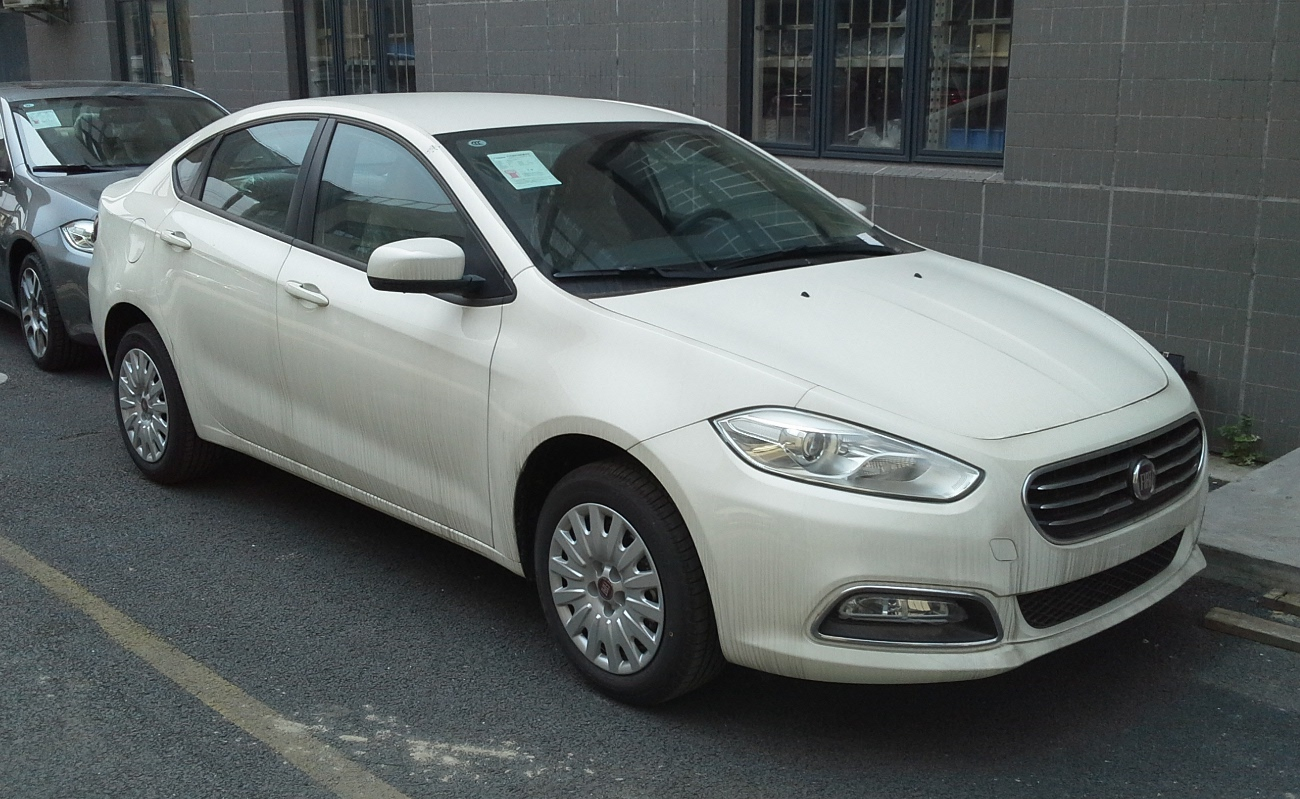
Fiat Viaggio (front)

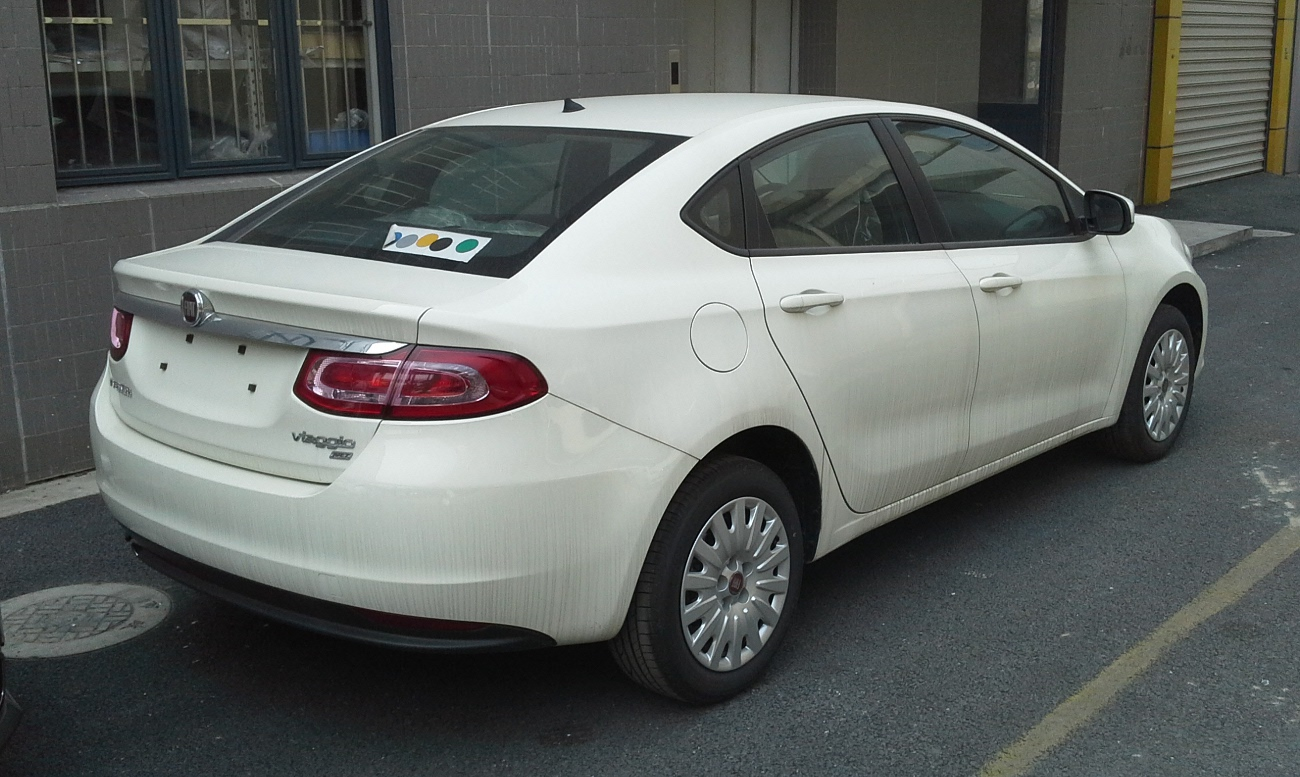
Fiat Viaggio (rear)

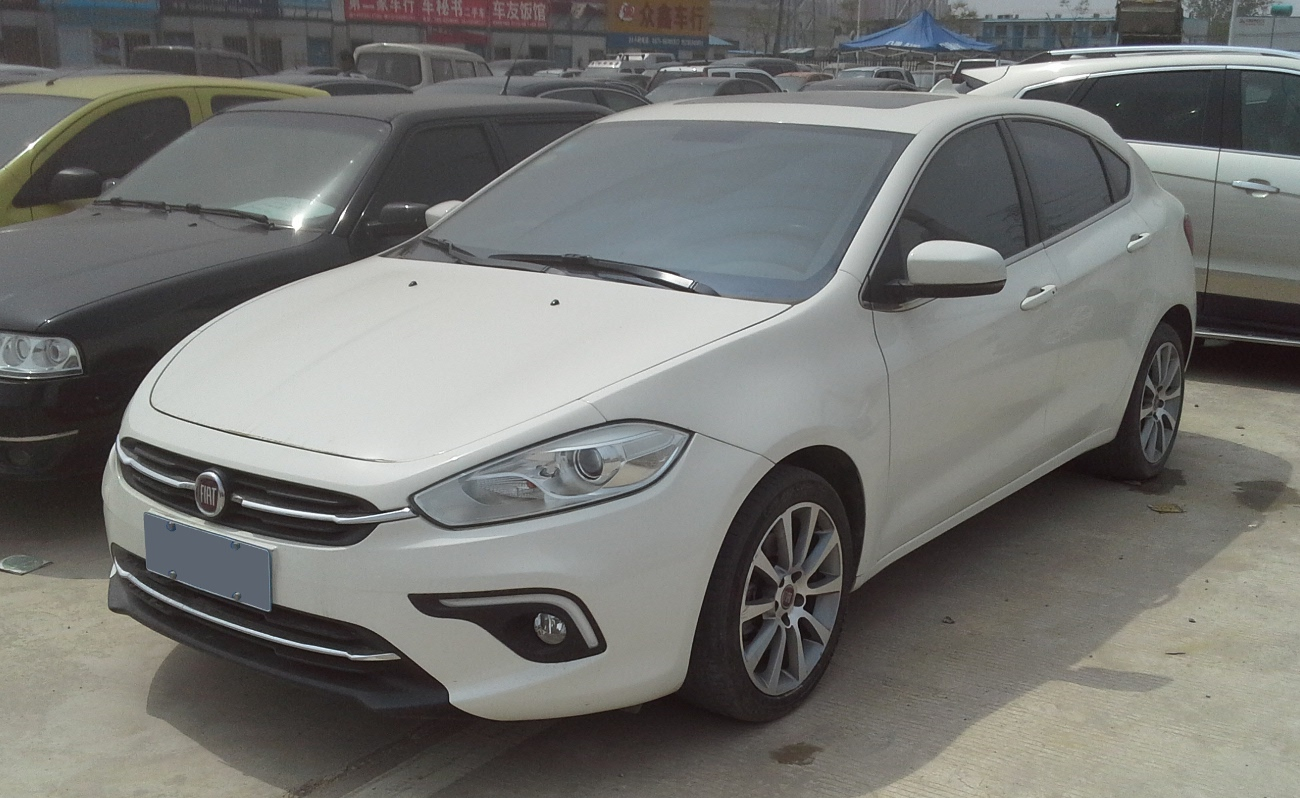
Fiat Ottimo (front)

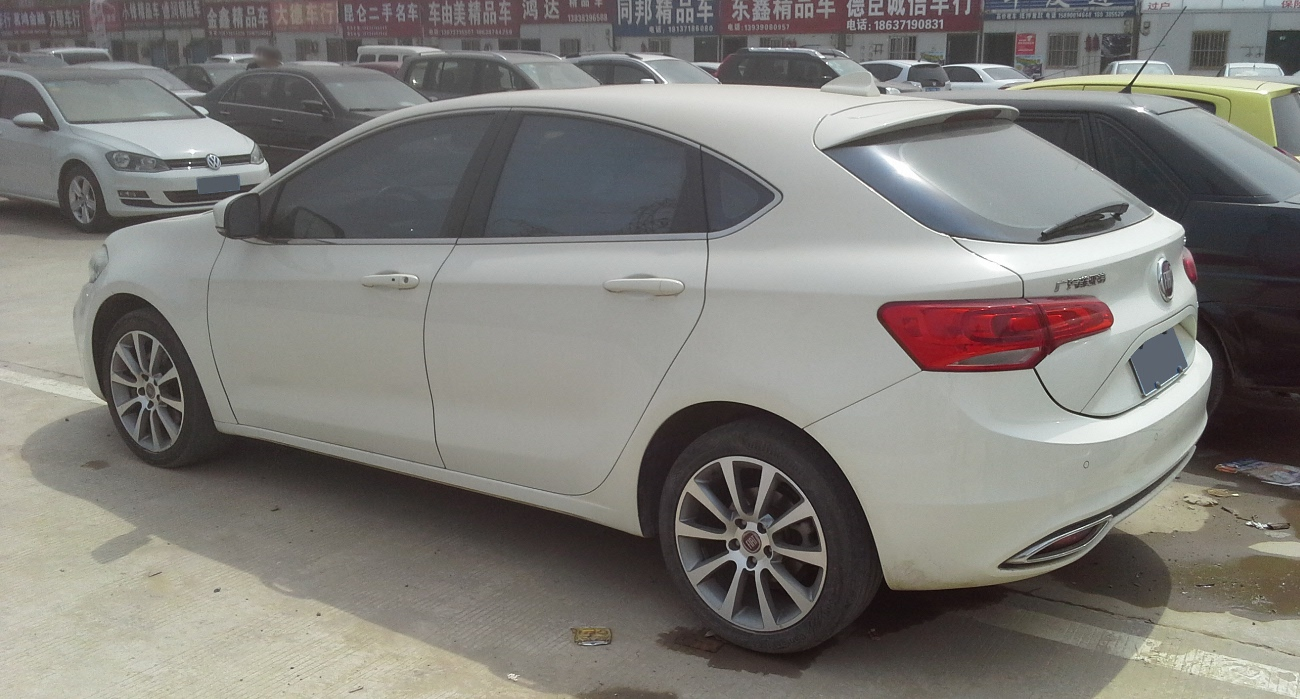
Fiat Ottimo (rear)

=== Engines ===
Model	Years	Type/code	Power at rpm, Torque at rpm
1.4T 120 HP	2012–2017	1,368 cc (83.5 cu in) I4 turbo (T-Jet turbo)	120 PS (88 kW; 118 hp) at 5,500, 206 N⋅m (152 lb⋅ft) at 2,500
1.4T 150 HP	2012–2017	1,368 cc (83.5 cu in) I4 turbo (T-Jet turbo)	150 PS (110 kW; 148 hp) at 5,500, 230 N⋅m (170 lb⋅ft) at 3,000

=== Transmissions ===
Model	Years	Types
Wyatt Exclusive Edition 1.4T 120 HP	2012–	5-speed manual, 6-speed dual dry clutch
Enjoy Edition 1.4T 120 HP	2012–	5-speed manual, 6-speed dual dry clutch
Energizer Enjoy Edition 1.4T 120 HP	2012–	6-speed dual dry clutch
Exclusive Edition 1.4T 150 HP	2012–	6-speed dual dry clutch

== Production ==
The Dart was manufactured at Chrysler's Belvidere Assembly Plant, where the Dodge Caliber (2006–2011), Jeep Compass, Jeep Patriot, the first and second generation Dodge Neon (1995–2005) and Dodge Neon SRT4 (2003–2005) were all manufactured.

The Dart used a modified variant of the Fiat Compact Platform, shared with the Alfa Romeo Giulietta, widened by 1.5 in (38 mm) and lengthened by 3.7 in (94 mm) to its wheelbase — creating the Compact U.S. Wide (CUSW) platform. The modified platform, adapted to U.S. requirements and subsequently redesignated the PF platform, was designed over approximately 18 months at a cost of US$1 billion.

== Marketing ==
In July 2012, the first television advertisement for the Dodge Dart aired during the broadcast of the Major League Baseball All-Star Game, featuring the bassline from Kanye West's "No Church in the Wild", a spoof on the Reliant Robin and a cameo by NFL's Tom Brady.

In May 2013, the Dodge Dart was marketed as a tie-in to promote the film Fast & Furious 6, despite not appearing on the film. The car appears in Fast & Furious 6 : The Game.

== Discontinuation ==
On January 27, 2016, Fiat Chrysler announced the end of Dodge Dart and Chrysler 200 production to redirect its focus towards crossover vehicles. A plan to move production from its Belvidere Assembly Plant to Mexico was in the works but later scrapped.

The Dart ended production on September 2, 2016, after failing to meet sales expectations. A revived Dodge Neon based on the Fiat Tipo replaced it in the Mexican market.

During a press conference held at the 2017 Detroit Auto Show, FCA President Sergio Marchionne said: "I can tell you right now that both the Chrysler 200 and the Dodge Dart, as great products as they were, were the least financially rewarding enterprises that we've carried out inside FCA in the last eight years," adding "I don't know one investment that was as bad as these two were."

The Dart's discontinuation has attributed to declining sales of passenger cars in general and particularly in the compact car segment. Moreover, there was shift in consumer preference towards SUVs and trucks which made the automaker focus on more profitable Jeep and Ram models. There was no reason to continue building a low-priced compact sedan that needed incentives such as interest-free financing to attract customers when buyers looked forward to higher-priced Jeeps with profit-driving high-end trims and option packages. The Dart's domestic competitors, the Chevrolet Cruze and Ford Focus, also suffered steep drops in sales, in contrast to Japanese models such as the Honda Civic and Toyota Corolla whose sales declined much more gradually during the shift towards SUVs. FCA's decision not to replace the Dart and 200 in favor of more crossover vehicles would later prove to be justified when Ford Motor Company announced in 2018 it was ending production of all non-truck vehicles except the Ford Mustang in North America, followed by the paring down of other passenger car models from other automakers.

During the COVID-19 pandemic in 2020, some remaining Dart models were sold to customers due to production issues of other models as a result of the pandemic.

== Sales ==
Sales of the Viaggio and Ottimo ended in September 2017 due to low sales performance, recording only 1,623 Viaggio and 650 Ottimo cars sold during its ending year of production.

Year	United States	Canada	Mexico	China	
Year	United States	Canada	Mexico	Fiat Viaggio	Fiat Ottimo
2012	25,304	3,460	2,526	11,288	
2013	83,388	9,870	1,066	48,375	
2014	83,858	7,623	849	43,922	24,168
2015	87,908	3,061	292	21,399	10,082
2016	43,402	1,424	44	7,618	5,081
2017	10,082	533		1,623	650
2018	386	4		248	21
2019	16	1		23	
2020	5				
2021	10	1			
2022	5				
2023	3				
2025	6				

Dodge reported the sale of one new Dart as during September 2024, eight years after production ended. They later reported selling another six in the third quarter of 2025.
