= Jeep Compass =

Compact crossover SUV

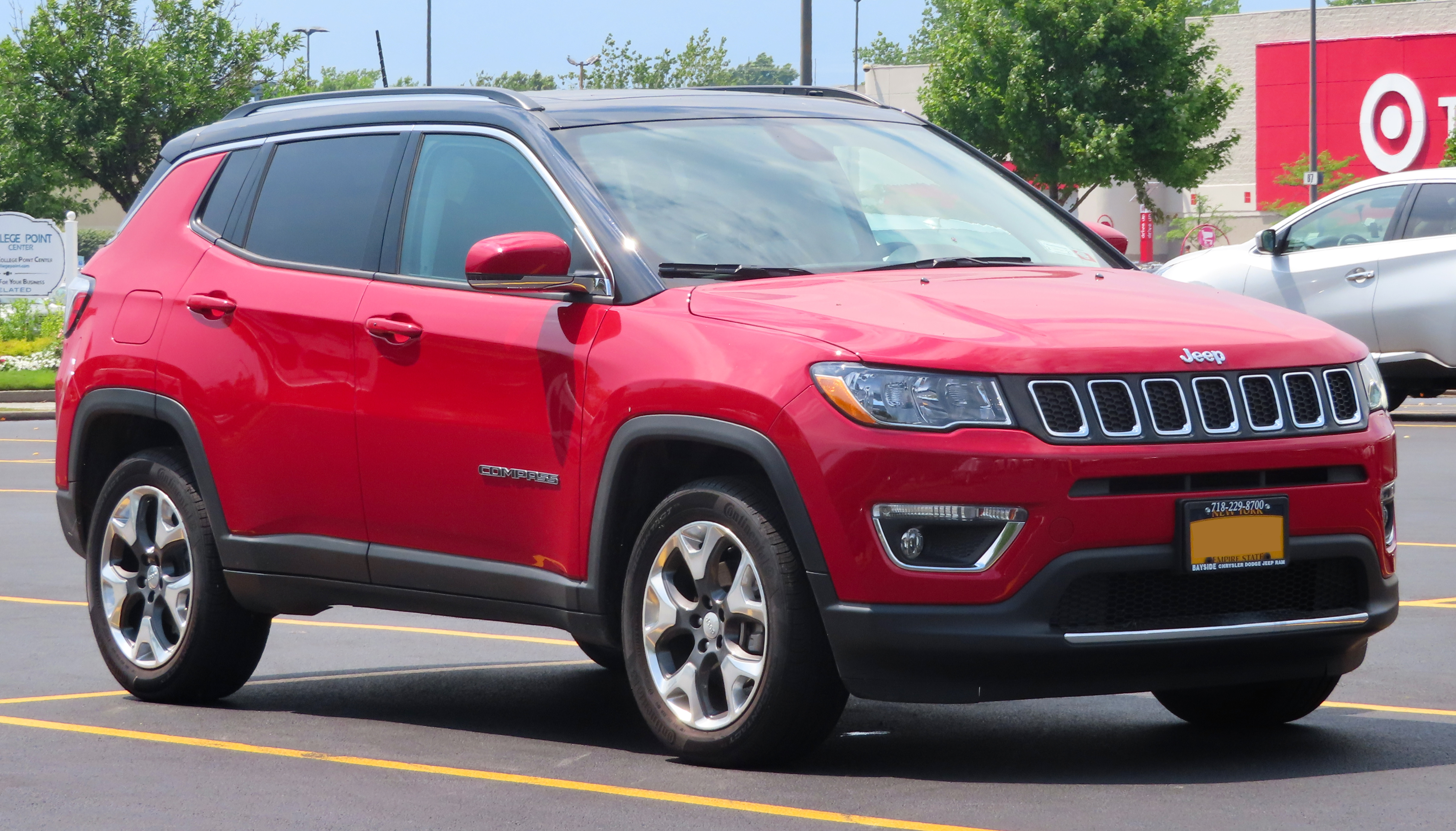
- 2019 Jeep Compass

Overview
- Manufacturer: Jeep (Note: DaimlerChrysler (2006–2007); Chrysler LLC (2007–2009); Chrysler Group LLC (2009–2014); FCA US LLC (2014–2021); Stellantis North America (2021–present))
- Production: 2006–present
- Model years: 2007–present

Body and chassis
- Class: Compact crossover SUV (C)
- Body style: 5-door SUV
- Layout: Front-engine, front-wheel drive or all-wheel drive
- Chassis: Unibody

The Jeep Compass is a compact crossover SUV, introduced in 2006 for the 2007 model year. The first generation Compass and Patriot, its rebadged variant, were among Jeep's first crossover SUVs.

The second-generation Compass debuted in September 2016 in Brazil and at the Los Angeles International Auto Show in November 2016, sharing a modified platform with the Renegade. It is positioned between the smaller Renegade and the larger Cherokee globally or the Commander in South America.

The third-generation Compass debuted in May 2025 and is built on the Stellantis-developed STLA Medium platform, shared with other PSA Groupe vehicles.

== Concept ==
Four years before the production Jeep Compass was introduced, a concept vehicle with the same name had its world premiere in Detroit at the 2002 North American International Auto Show. It featured a two-door body, all-wheel drive, and a 3.7-liter V6 engine.

The 3.7 L Power-Tech V6 engine from the Jeep Liberty was not available in the new 2007 Compass, though the production model Compass retained the concept car's styling cues and some of its features. The production model Compass also had four doors instead of the two doors on the concept car.

== First generation (MK49; 2006) ==
First generation
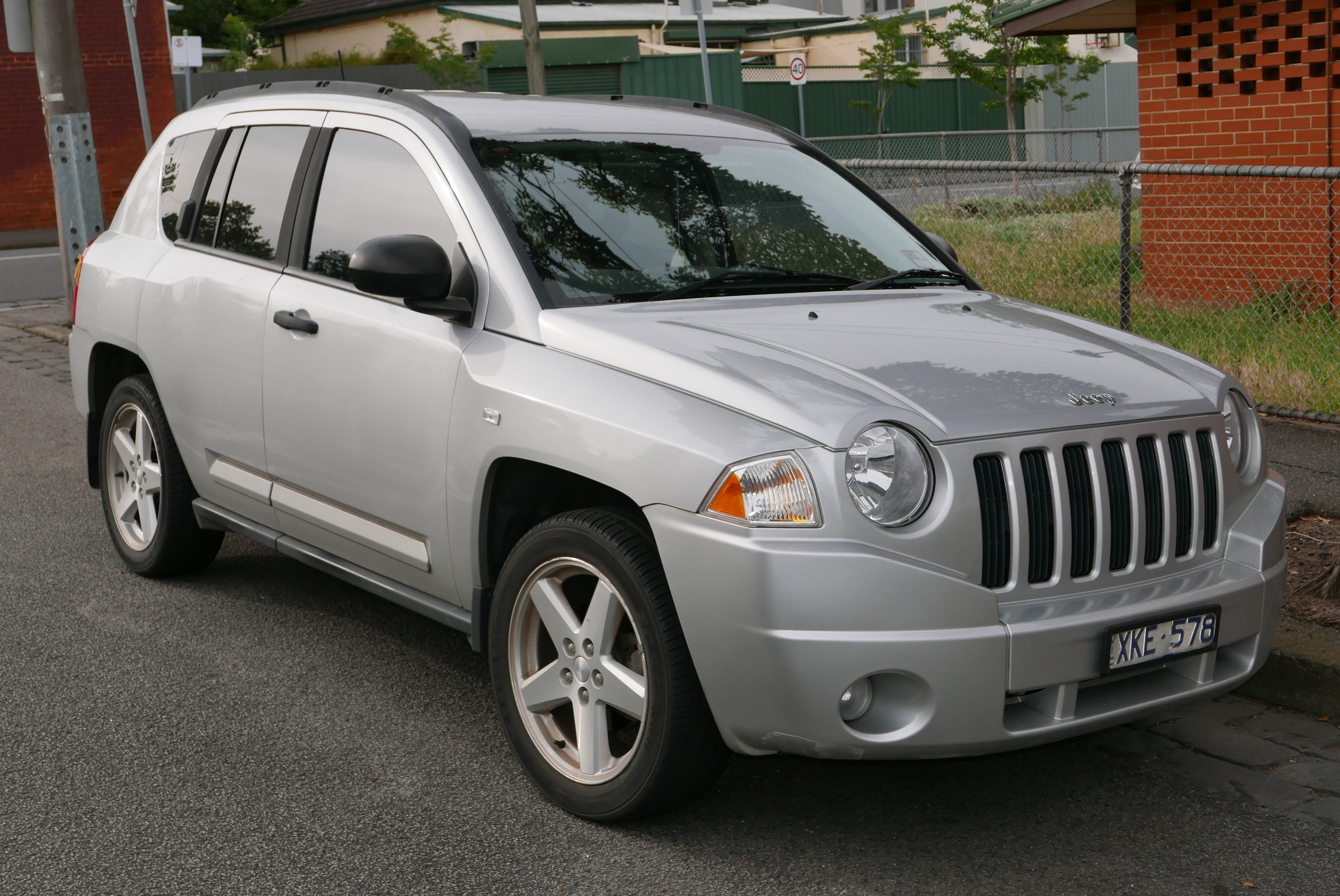
- 2008 Jeep Compass Sport

Overview
- Production: 2006–2016
- Model years: 2007–2017
- Assembly: United States: Belvidere, Illinois (Belvidere Assembly Plant)

Body and chassis
- Platform: Chrysler PM/MK platform
- Related: Dodge Caliber; Jeep Patriot; Mitsubishi ASX

Powertrain
- Engine: Gasoline: 2.0 L GEMA/Chrysler World I4; 2.4 L GEMA/Chrysler World I4; Diesel: 2.0 L VAG EA188 CRD PD I4 turbo-diesel; 2.2 L Mercedes-Benz OM651 CRD I4 turbo
- Transmission: 5-speed Magna T355 manual; 6-speed Aisin BG6 manual; 6-speed Hyundai 6F24 automatic; CVT Jatco JF011E automatic

Dimensions
- Wheelbase: 103.7 in (2,635 mm)
- Length: 173.4 in (4,404 mm)
- Width: 69.3 in (1,760 mm)
- Height: 64.2 in (1,631 mm) 2007–09; 65.2 in (1,656 mm) 2010–:
- Curb weight: 1,460–1,685 kg (3,219–3,715 lb)

Jeep debuted the production version of the Compass at the 2006 North American International Auto Show in January. The first Compass was assembled on May 30, 2006, in Belvidere, Illinois, where the Dodge Neon was produced.

The Compass did not carry the "Trail Rated" badge found on other SUVs in the Jeep family for the 2007-2010 model years, but received the "Trail Rated" badge for the 2011 model year. The Compass targets first-time Jeep buyers and those who drive primarily on paved roads.

The Compass and Patriot are both based on the DaimlerChrysler/Mitsubishi GS platform. These vehicles are differentiated by their styling and marketing: The Patriot is a traditionally styled 4-door Jeep wagon, while the Compass has a softer hatchback look, similar to the Dodge Caliber.

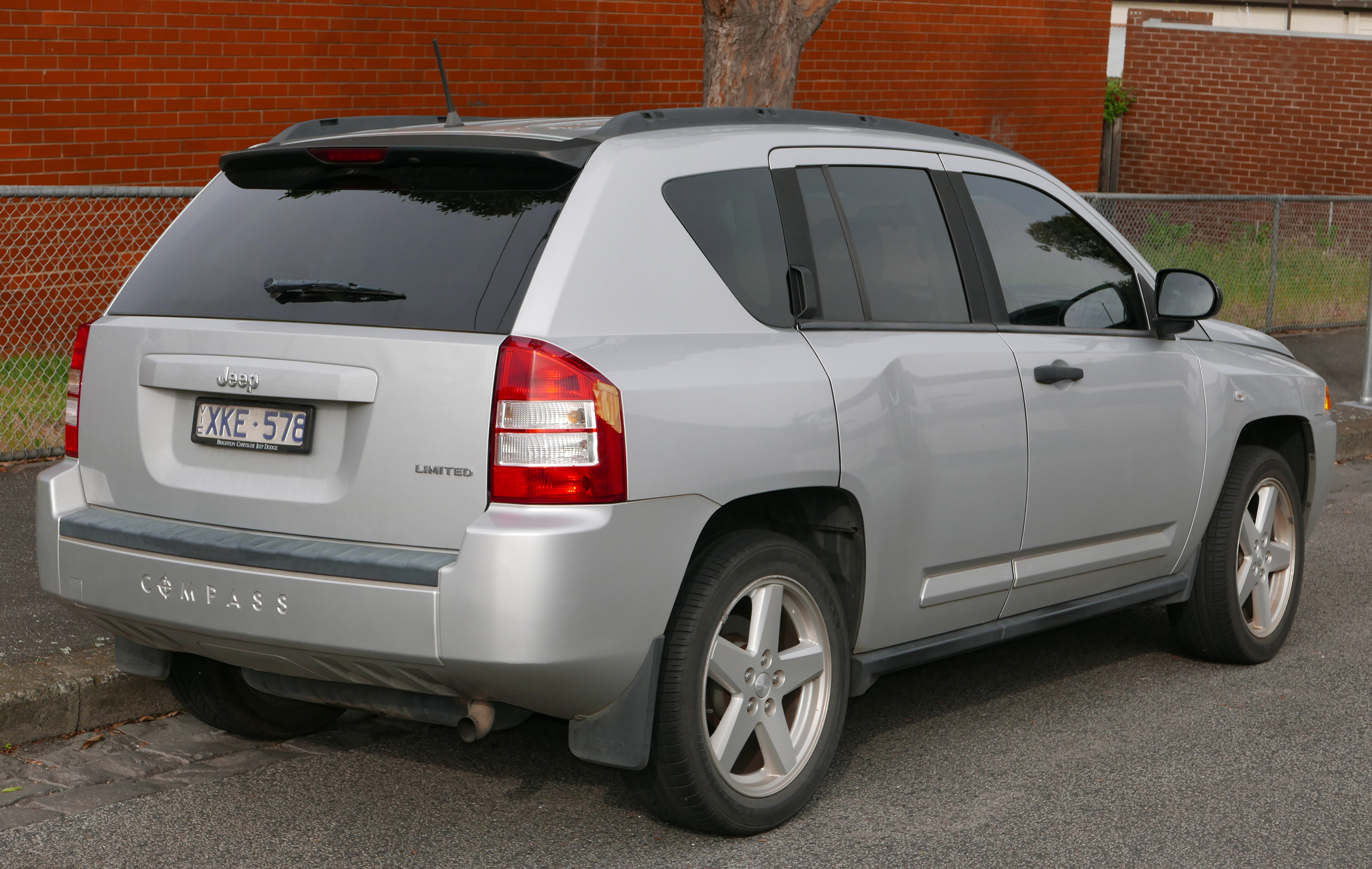
Rear view

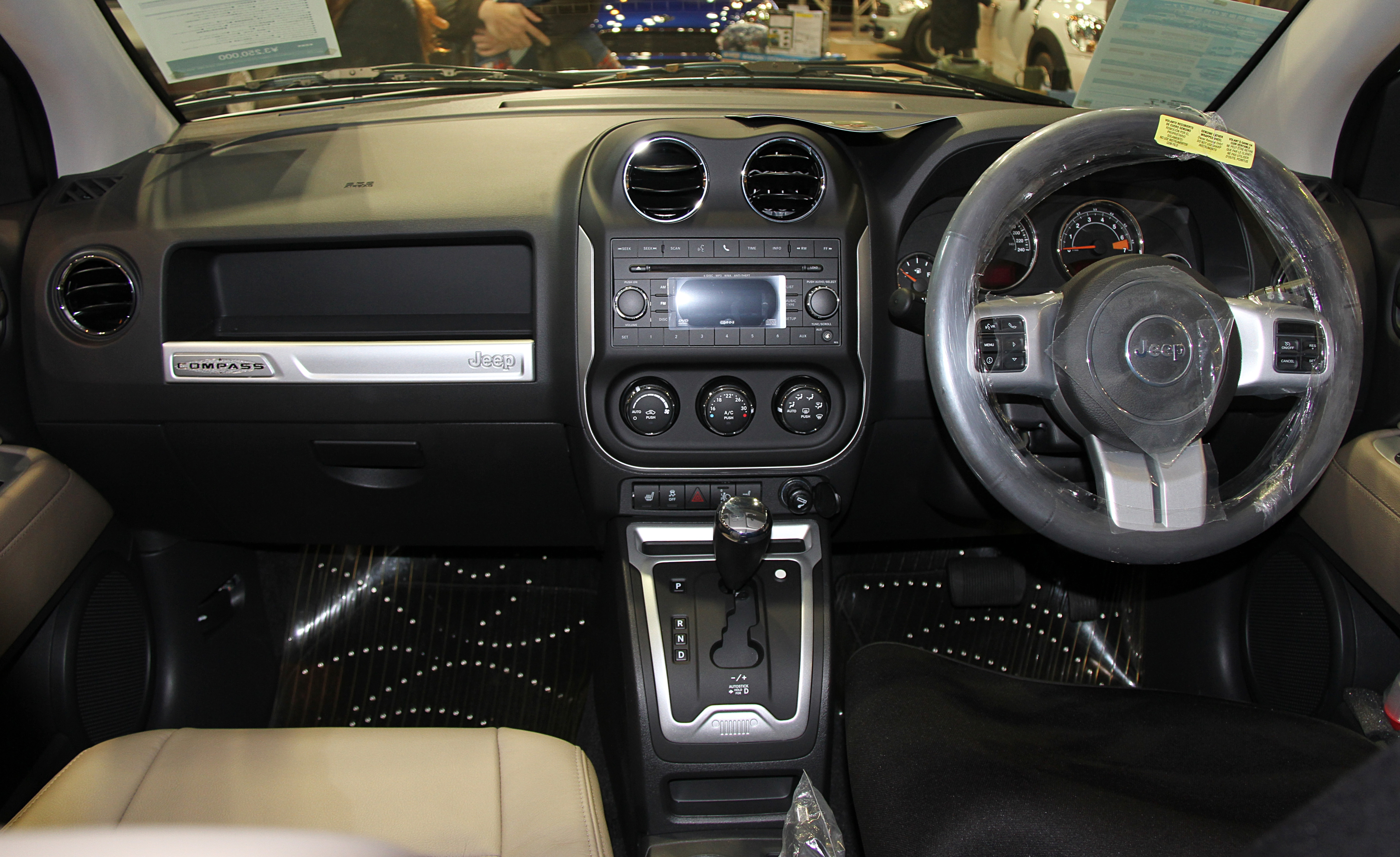
Interior

=== 2011 facelift ===
Jeep redesigned the Compass to resemble the Grand Cherokee more closely for the 2011 model year. The suspension was revised for better handling. The new interior included additional standard equipment. New option packages included a Freedom Drive II Off-Road Package with a continuously variable transmission fitted with a low-range setting, all-terrain tires on 17-inch aluminum wheels, skid plates, a four-wheel-drive system, and an increased ground clearance of a full inch.

A special edition Compass model commemorated Jeep's 70th anniversary in 2011, and included various upgrades, special interiors, badges, wheels, and was available in only three exterior colors: Bronze Star, Bright Silver, and Black.

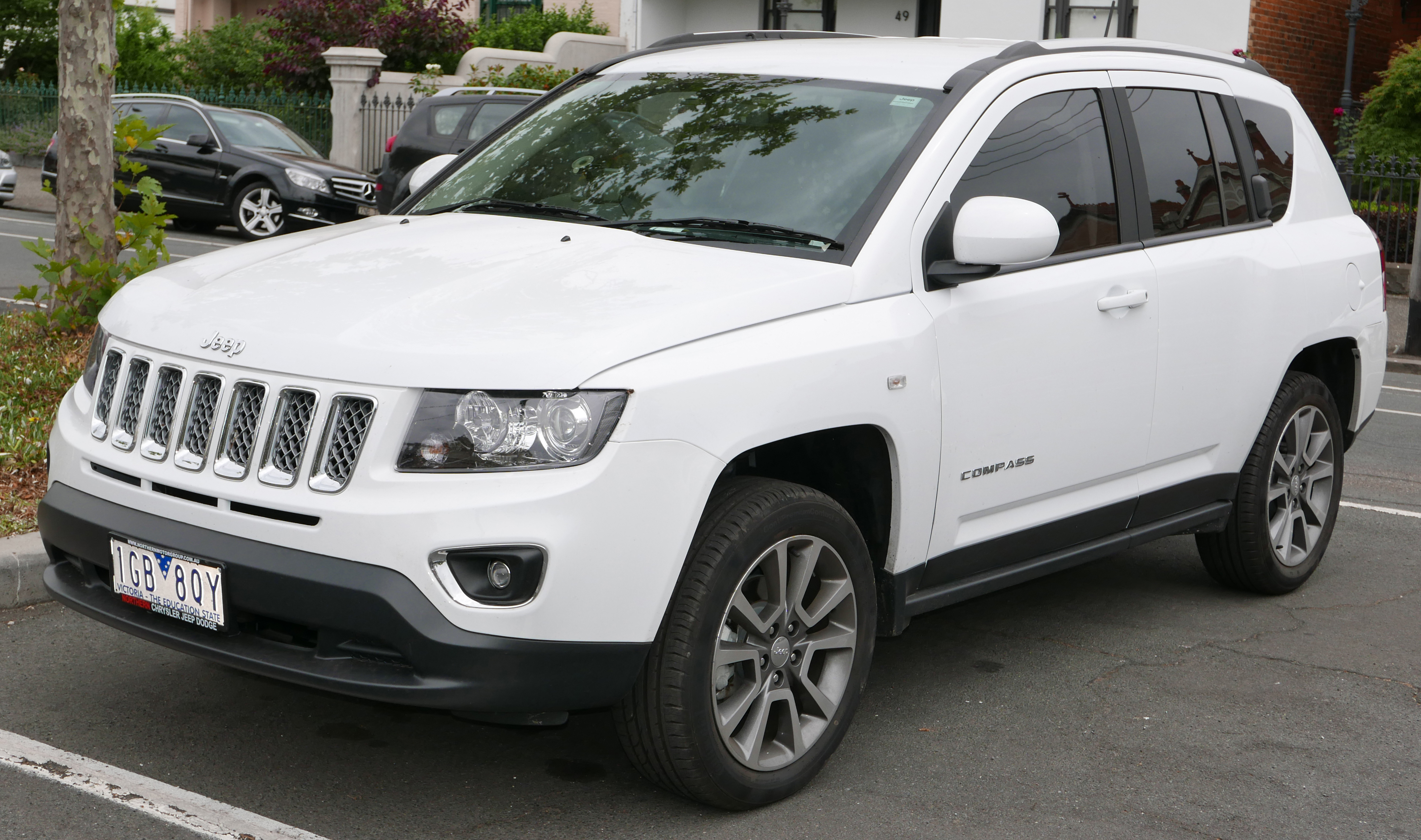
Facelift

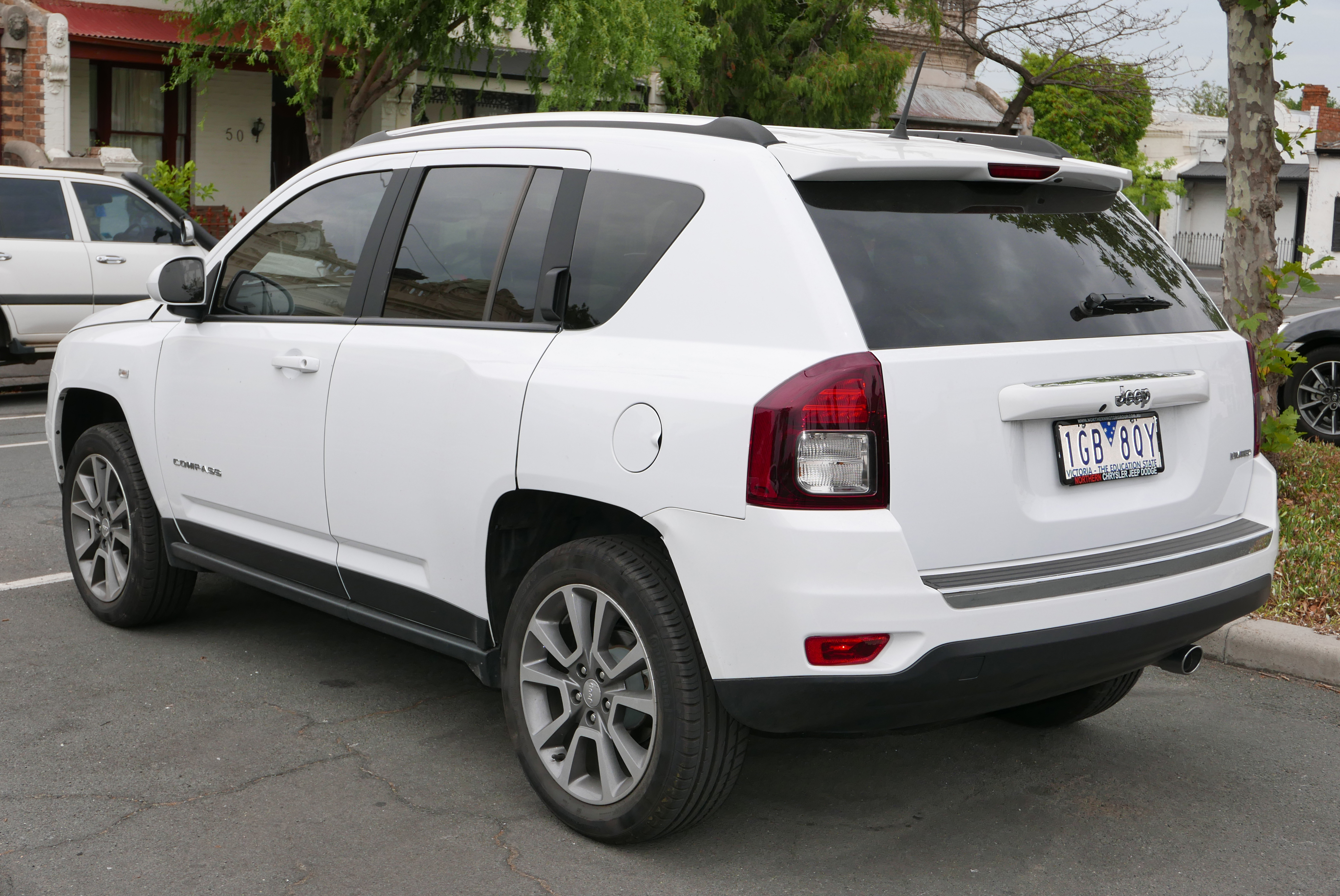
Rear view

=== Powertrain ===
The Compass uses a 172 hp (128 kW) 2.4 L World I4 gasoline engine. The 2.0 L World engine is available on the 4X2 Sport model with 158 hp (118 kW). A 2.0 L l-R4 TDi 103 kW (138 hp; 140 PS) Volkswagen-designed diesel engine was available for the European and Australian markets, replaced in 2011 by the 2.2 L Mercedes-Benz OM651.

The Compass featured two electronically controlled four-wheel drive systems: Freedom Drive I and Freedom Drive II. Freedom Drive I is a full-time four-wheel drive system with locking capabilities; Freedom Drive II is based on Freedom Drive I, but by using the vehicle's CVT transmission, it provides of a 19:1 gear reduction, simulating a low-range usually found in vehicles with dedicated transfer cases.

The base model version has front-wheel drive (FWD). The Trail Rated version of the Compass has passed the same off-road testing as other Jeep vehicles for traction, ground clearance, maneuverability, articulation, and water fording.

=== Models ===
The three basic models of Compass in the U.S are Sport, Latitude, and Limited.

The Sport serves as the base model. It includes features such as seventeen-inch alloy wheels, an AM/FM stereo with single-disc CD player and four speakers, a heater, cloth seating surfaces, and manual, roll-up windows and manual door locks. Features such as power windows and door locks, a seven-speaker Boston Acoustics premium sound system with a 368-watt external amplifier, and air conditioning are options. The 2014-2016 Jeep Compass Sport and Sport SE, the Electronic Vehicle Information Center (EVIC) does not come as standard equipment. An EVIC gives the user information such as gas mileage, number of miles to empty, service intervals, tire pressure, etc.

The Latitude is the midrange model. It added features onto the Sport, such as air conditioning, keyless entry, a security system, and power windows and door locks. The EVIC comes as an optional component with the security and cargo convenience package. This option comes with an alarm, tonneau cover, tire pressure monitoring display, garage door opener, and an electronic vehicle information center. The model became available in 2011.

The Limited is the top-of-the-line model. It added features such as leather-trimmed seats, had an available sunroof, and remote starter.

A 70th Anniversary Edition was based on the Sport model. It added air conditioning, unique leather-trimmed seats, unique alloy wheels, a sunroof, side-impact airbags, a seven-speaker Boston Acoustics premium sound system with a 368-watt external amplifier, power windows and door locks, keyless entry, and a security alarm. This special edition model was only offered in 2011 to celebrate Jeep's 70th anniversary. All Jeep models for 2011 only offered a 70th Anniversary Edition model (Compass, Patriot, Wrangler, Wrangler Unlimited, Liberty, and Grand Cherokee).

An Altitude Edition model was made available in 2012. It was based upon the Latitude model and added black-painted alloy wheels, leather-trimmed seats, a sunroof, and a Boston Acoustics premium sound system with a 368-watt external amplifier. The Altitude package was available on the Jeep Grand Cherokee only at first, but then it was available on the Compass, Patriot, Wrangler, and Wrangler Unlimited as well. All models except the Jeep Grand Cherokee dropped this model (the Grand Cherokee model continued to offer this model for the 2013 model year). The Altitude name was chosen in a contest to name a Grand Cherokee concept car. Because of the Altitude's popularity, Jeep decided to offer it on all models except for the Jeep Liberty, which had been discontinued.

The Jeep Patriot and first-generation Jeep Compass were phased out during the 2016 model year, replaced by a single redesigned Compass SUV that FCA debuted in late 2016.

=== Safety ===
ANCAP test results* Jeep Compass 4x4 variants (2012)
Test	Score
Overall	4 /5 stars
Frontal offset	11.21/16
Side impact	16/16
Pole	2/2
Seat belt reminders	0/3
Whiplash protection	Not Assessed
Pedestrian protection	Poor
Electronic stability control	Standard

The Compass was safety tested by Euro NCAP in 2012 and earned a two-star rating.

Euro NCAP test results* Jeep Compass (2012)
Test	Points	%
Overall:	2 /5 stars	
Adult occupant:	22	61%
Child occupant:	37	76%
Pedestrian:	8	23%
Safety assist:	3	43%

NHTSA 2013 Compass:
Overall:	3/5 stars
Frontal Driver:	3/5 stars
Frontal Passenger:	3/5 stars
Side Driver:	5/5 stars
Side Passenger:	2/5 stars
Side Rear Passenger:	4/5 stars
Rollover AWD:	/ 16.4%

== Second generation (MP/552; 2016) ==
Second generation
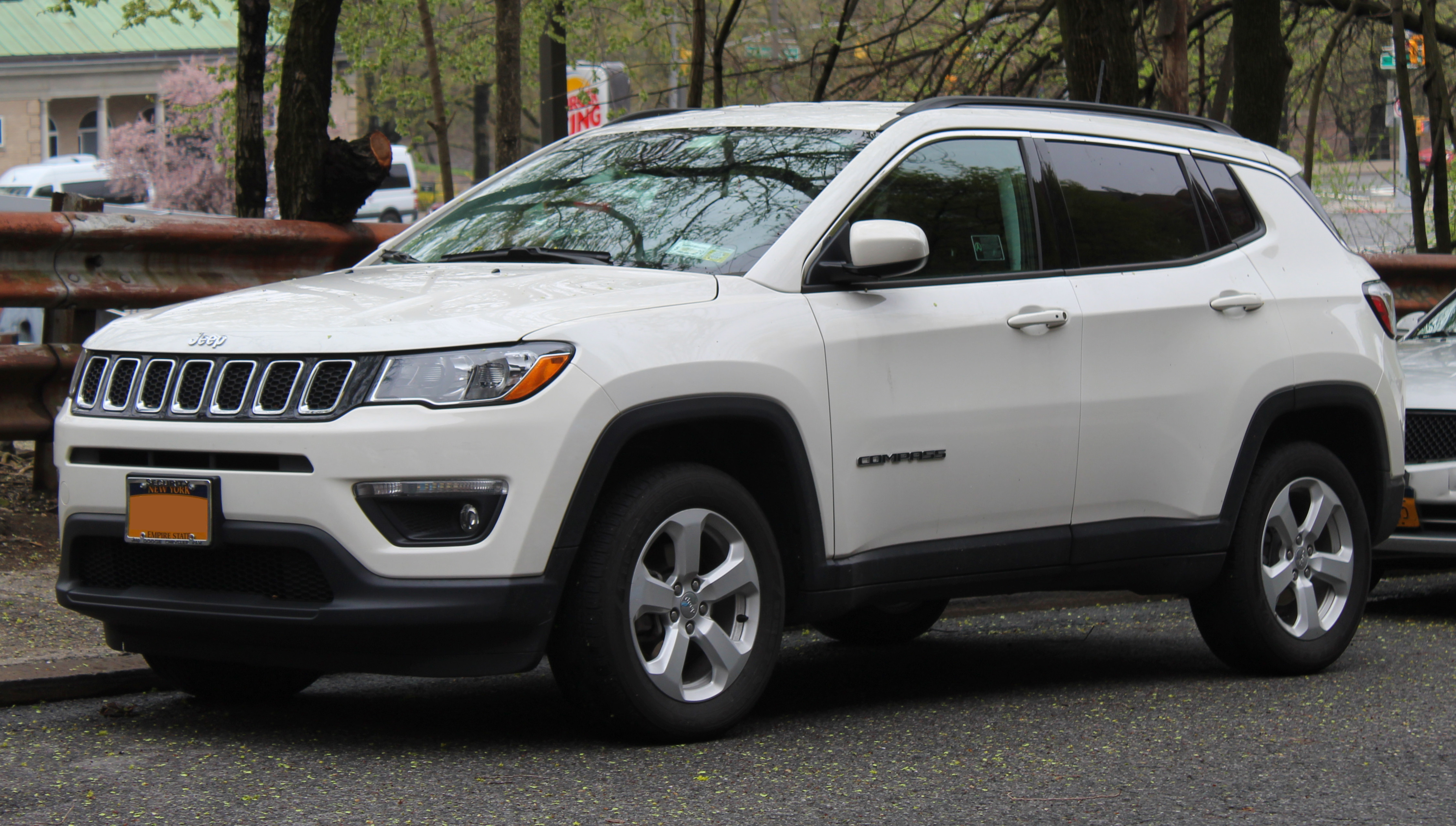

Overview
- Production: 2016–2026; 2016–2022 (China)
- Model years: 2017–2027 (USA)
- Assembly: Mexico: Toluca (Toluca Car Assembly); Italy: Melfi, Potenza (SATA); Brazil: Goiana, Pernambuco (FCA Brazil); China: Guangzhou (GAC Stellantis); India: Ranjangaon, Maharashtra (FIAPL)

Body and chassis
- Platform: FCA Small Wide LWB 4x4
- Related: Jeep Commander (2022); Ram Rampage; Fiat Toro; Fiat 500X

Powertrain
- Engine: Gasoline: 1.3 L FPT GSE T4 turbo I4; 1.4 L FCA FIRE MultiAir turbo I4; 2.0 L GEMA Tigershark n/a I4; 2.0 L FCA GME turbo I4; 2.4 L GEMA Tigershark I4; 2.4 L GEMA Tigershark MultiAir I4; Gasoline Plug-in Hybrid: 1.3 L FCA GSE T4 turbo I4 (PHEV); 1.5 L FCA TURBO T4 E-HYBRID; Diesel: 1.6 L Fiat Multijet II turbo I4; 2.0 L Fiat Multijet II turbo I4
- Electric motor: 45 kW (60 hp; 61 PS) FCA eMotor (4xe)
- Transmission: 6-speed FPT C635 manual; 6-speed FPT C635 dual-clutch automatic; 6-speed Aisin TF-60SN torque converter automatic (4xe); 7-speed FPT C725 dual-clutch automatic; 8-speed Hyundai 8F30 torque converter automatic; 9-speed ZF 948TE torque converter automatic
- Hybrid drivetrain: PHEV (4xe)
- Battery: 11.4 kWh 400-volt Li-ion pack

Dimensions
- Wheelbase: 2,640 mm (103.9 in)
- Length: 174.0 in (4,420 mm)
- Width: 71.7 in (1,820 mm)
- Height: 65.0 in (1,650 mm)
- Curb weight: 1,505–1,935 kg (3,318–4,266 lb)

Chronology
- Predecessor: Jeep Patriot

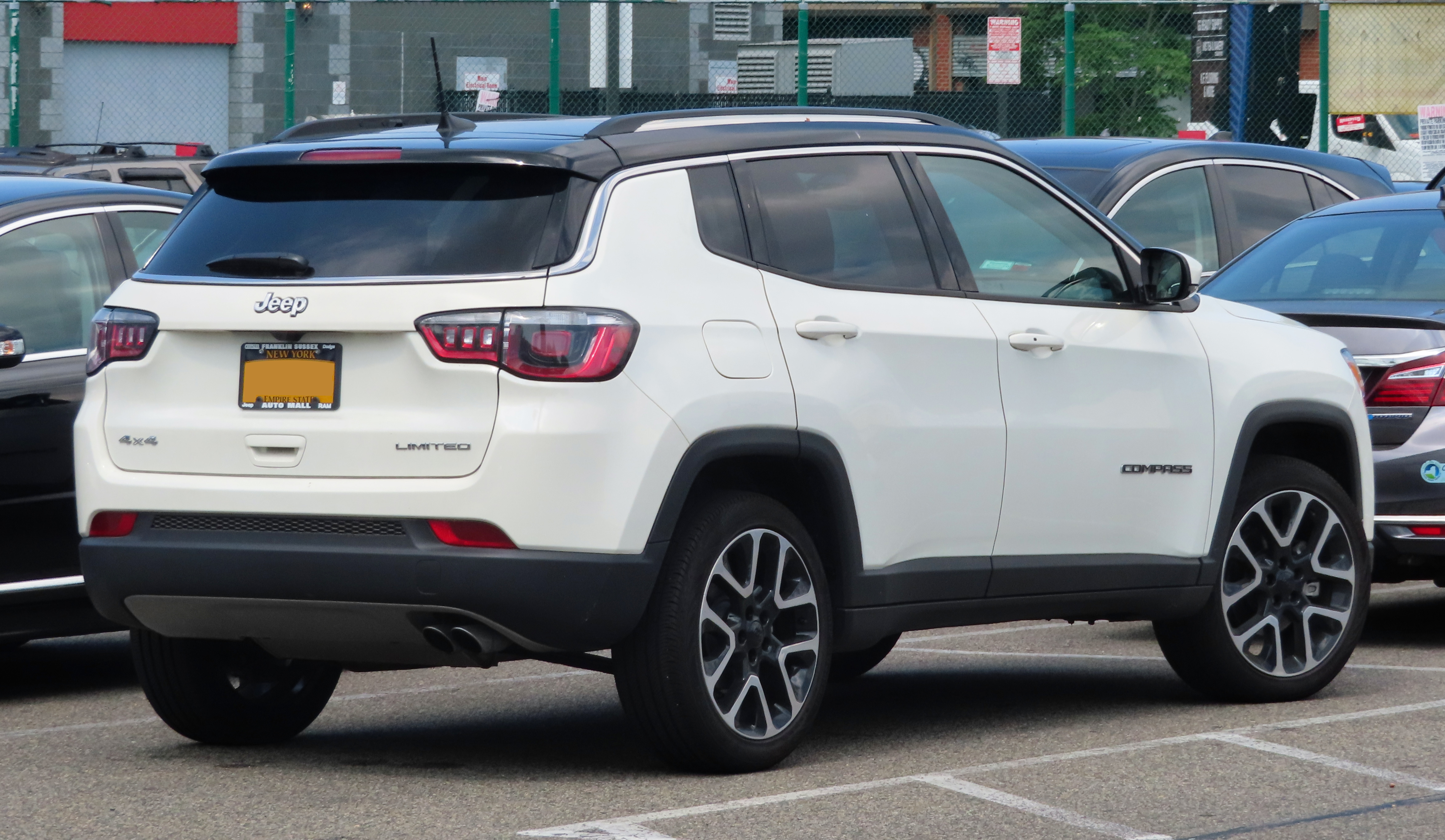
Rear view (pre-facelift)

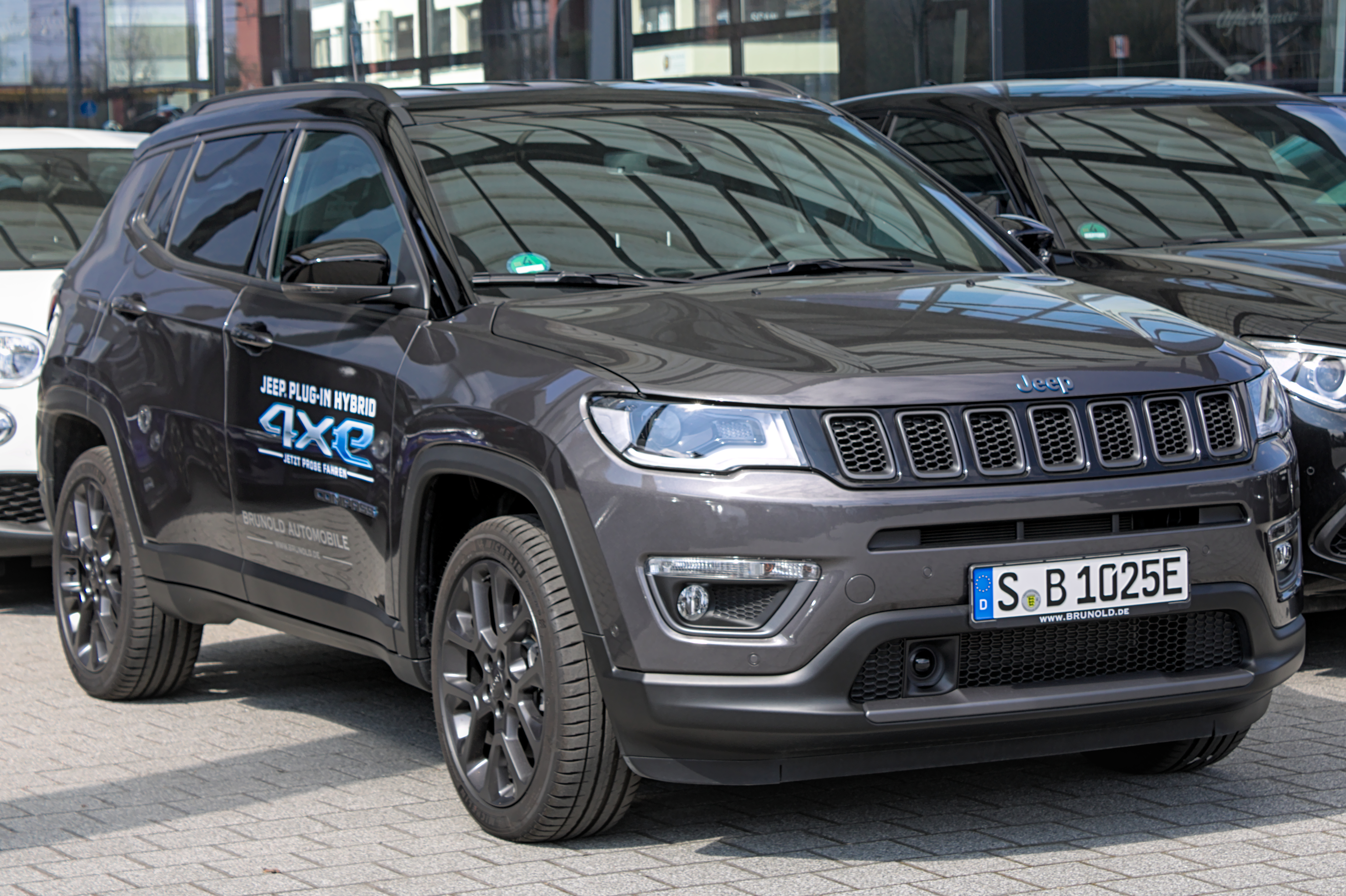
Jeep Compass PHEV

The second-generation of Jeep Compass debuted on September 27, 2016, in Brazil and at the Los Angeles International Auto Show in November 2016, replacing the Jeep Patriot and first generation Compass. Production for North American-market Compass models was moved to Toluca, Mexico, while Jeep Cherokee (KL) production will move from Toledo, Ohio to Belvidere, Illinois, where the first-generation Compass and Jeep Patriot were both assembled.

Using a stretched version of the same platform as the Renegade, the Compass is available in four distinct trim levels: the base Sport, the mid-level Latitude, the higher-end Limited, and the off-road-focused Trailhawk. All trim levels are available with either front-wheel drive or four-wheel drive, except the Trailhawk, which is only available in a 4WD configuration.

In the United States, the Compass comes equipped with a 2.4 L Tigershark four-cylinder engine. More than 65 percent of the upper body structure and the frame is made of high-strength steel. Styling of the second-generation Compass is inspired by two of its larger siblings, the Jeep Cherokee (KL) and Jeep Grand Cherokee (WK2). Styling elements taken from the Grand Cherokee include headlamps integrated into the front grille and a narrow front grille with a black finish, while the Cherokee lends some of its rear end styling elements, basic interior design, and 2.4 L Tigershark inline four-cylinder (I4) gasoline engine and ZF-sourced nine-speed 948TE automatic transmission to the overall design of the Compass.

Available features include FCA's UConnect 4C 8.4 and 8.4N touch-screen infotainment systems, a Beats Premium Audio System with a 506-watt digital amplifier, eighteen-inch aluminum alloy wheels, Jeep's Command-View panoramic sunroof, LED front headlamps, Forward Collision Warning, a ParkView rear-view backup camera system, front and rear parking sensors, Blind Spot Information System (BLIS), and Jeep's Selec-Terrain full-time four-wheel-drive system (standard on the Trailhawk model).

=== Production ===
The Compass is assembled at plants in Italy, Mexico, Brazil, China, and India. North American and European models are manufactured in Melfi, Italy (designation: BU/520) and Toluca, Mexico (designation: MP/522); moved from Belvidere, Illinois. In Brazil, the second-generation Jeep Compass started production the 26 September 2016 at FCA's new Goiana, Pernambuco Assembly Plant (designation: M1/551). Chinese models were produced by the GAC Fiat Chrysler joint venture (designation: M4/553). Production of the first-generation Compass and Patriot ended in early 2017, with production of the second-generation Compass beginning in early 2017 for North American models. Assembled at Fiat's facility in Ranjangaon, Maharashtra, it is Jeep's first model assembled in India since 1996 (designation: M6/566). The right-hand drive version is solely produced at the Indian plant. Stellantis's Brampton Assembly plant in Ontario, Canada, is to be retooled for the next-generation Compass, with production commencing in the fourth quarter of 2025. Stellantis is planning a US$970 million (1.32 billion Canadian-dollar) investment so that Brampton can build cars with internal combustion engines as well as battery-electric vehicles.

=== India ===
The Compass was unveiled in India on April 12, 2017, and has been assembled in the Fiat India Automobiles plant in Ranjangaon near Pune, jointly operated by Stellantis and Tata Motors, since June 1, 2017. In addition to manufacturing for the Indian market, Jeep also exports the Indian-made Compass to many right-hand drive markets such as the United Kingdom, Australia, New Zealand, Ireland, Brunei, Japan, Indonesia, South Africa, Nepal, and Thailand. The India-spec model is available with two engine options - a 1.4-liter I4, turbocharged MultiAir gasoline engine, and a 2.0-liter I4, turbocharged Multijet II diesel engine. In 2017 Jeep sold about 10,000 Compasses in India from the day of release until the middle of December.

In 2017, the vehicle contained over 65% Indian parts.

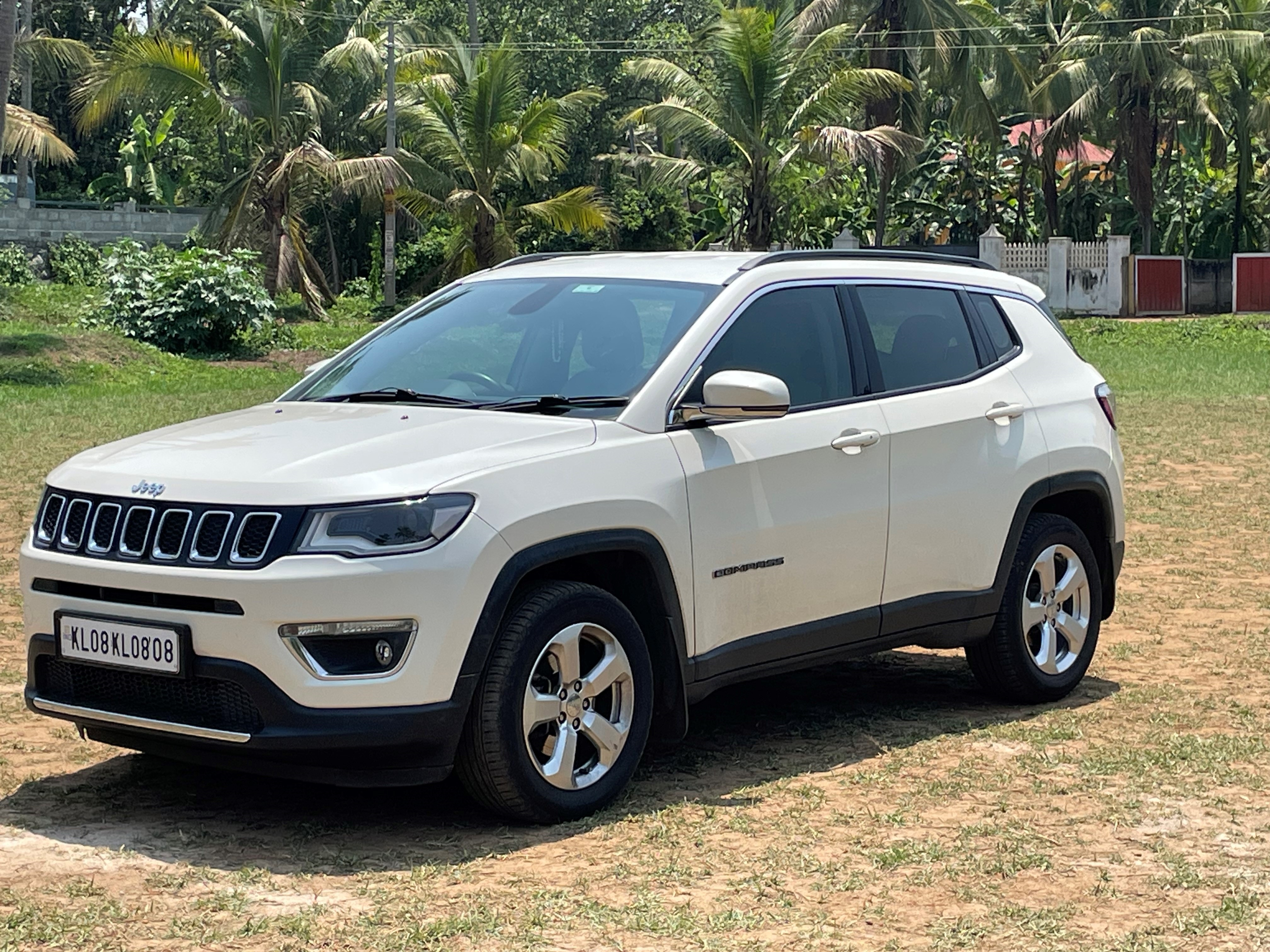
2018 Jeep Compass Limited (India, pre-facelift)

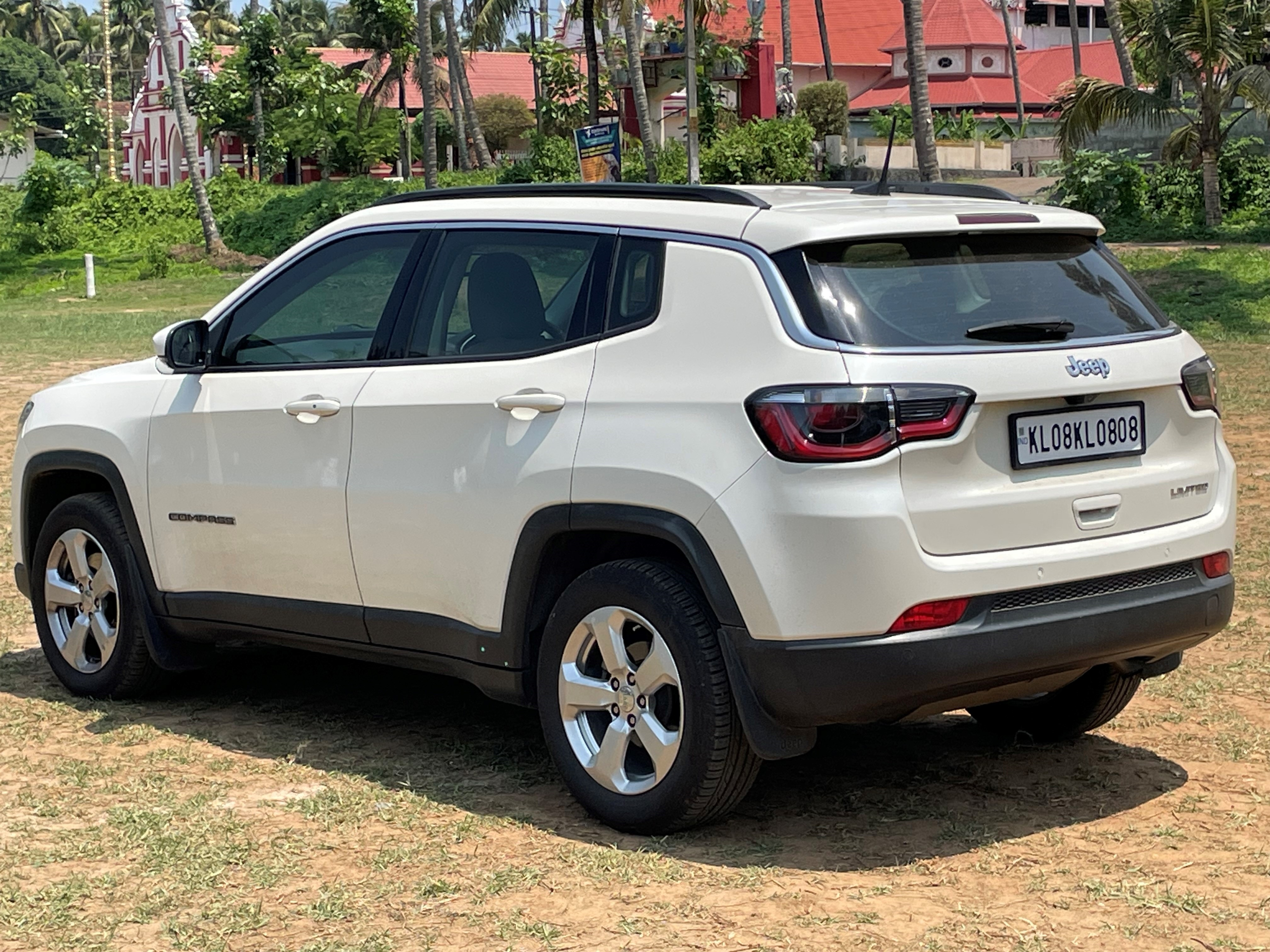
Rear view (India, pre-facelift)

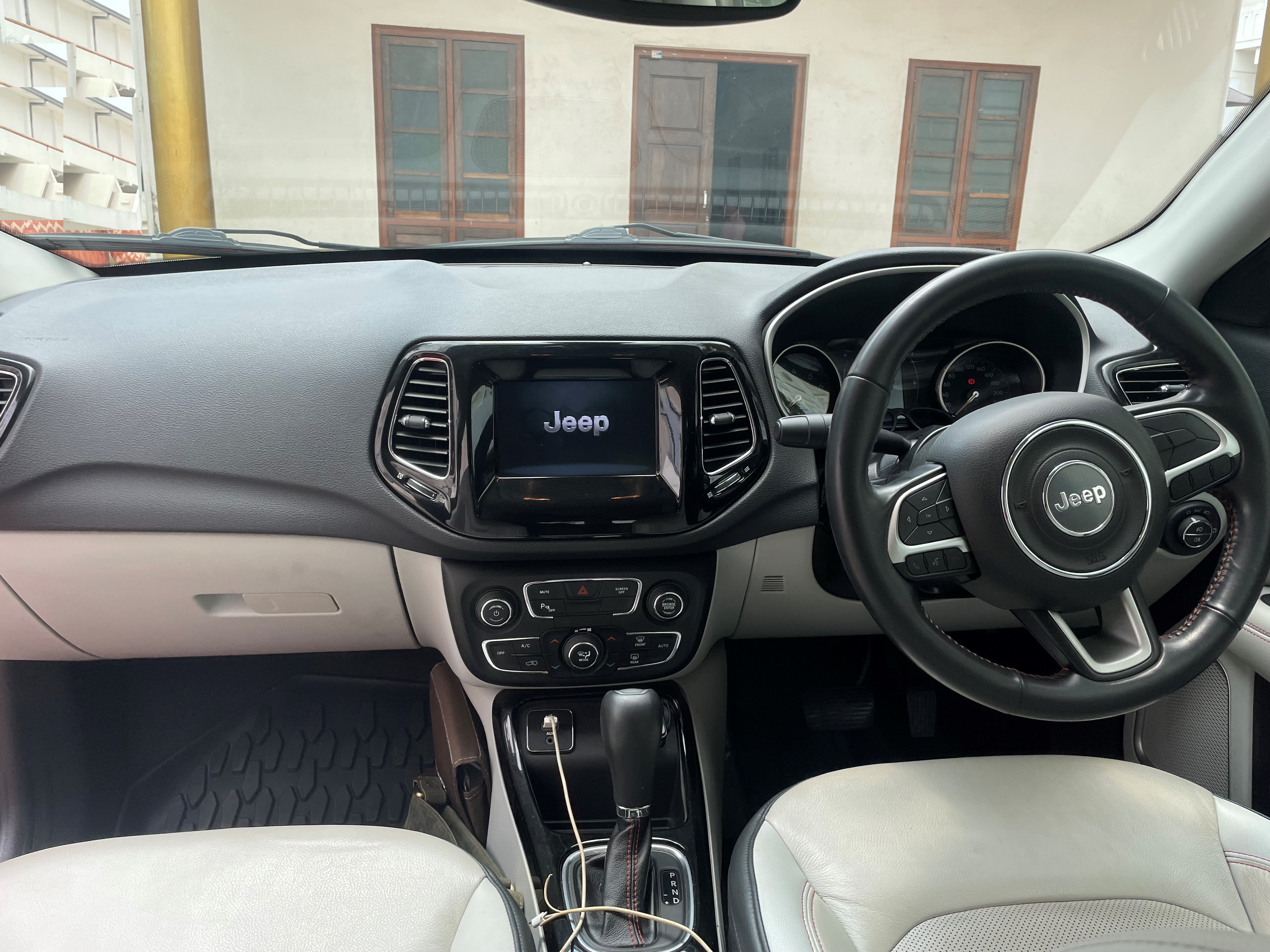
Interior (India, pre-facelift)

=== Facelift ===
In 2020, a facelift for the model was first launched in China, with slight visual changes to the exterior of the vehicle, and a completely redesigned interior. In January 2021, the Compass facelift was released in India. It gets a revised front profile, a larger grille, a new front bumper with a larger air dam, slimmer headlights with Integrated LED DRLs, LED fog lights, and new alloy wheels.

The 2022 US model includes over-the-air updates and includes collision warning with automatic braking, lane-keep assist, pedestrian/cycle detection, active lane management, blind-spot monitor, and rear cross-traffic alert. It also includes a semi-autonomous assist system called Highway Assist that allows for hand-on-wheel and eyes-on-road automated driving.

The 2022 Compass lineup consisted of existing Sport, Latitude, Trailhawk, Limited, and High Altitude models, although a new Latitude Lux model, slotting between the mid-range Latitude and luxury-oriented Limited trims, became available. A limited-edition (RED) Edition model was also available, based on the Limited trim. The sole engine remained the naturally aspirated 2.4-liter Tigershark four-cylinder gasoline engine producing 177 hp (132 kW) and 172 lb⋅ft (233 N⋅m) of torque (down 3 horsepower and 3 lb. ft. of torque, from 180 and 175, respectively). All four-wheel drive models received the nine-speed 948TE automatic ZF 9HP transmission as standard equipment, while front-wheel-drive models received the six-speed Aisin automatic transmission as standard. Sport and Latitude models are available with front-wheel-drive with optional all-wheel-drive, while all other models include standard all-wheel-drive.

For the 2023 Compass, the 2.4-liter engine was replaced by a new retuned version of the 2.0-liter GME four-cylinder gasoline engine, producing 200 hp (149 kW) and 221 lb⋅ft (300 N⋅m) of torque. The ZF 9HP-based, 9-speed automatic transmission has also been replaced with a Hyundai-sourced "8F30" 8-speed automatic transmission.

For 2024, the Compass became the entry-level model for Jeep in North America, following the withdrawal of the Renegade in that market outside Latin America and the global discontinuation of the Cherokee, though the upcoming all-electric Jeep Recon is expected to slot below the Compass. The Renegade and (in some markets) the Jeep Avenger continue to serve as Jeep's entry-level models below the Compass globally.

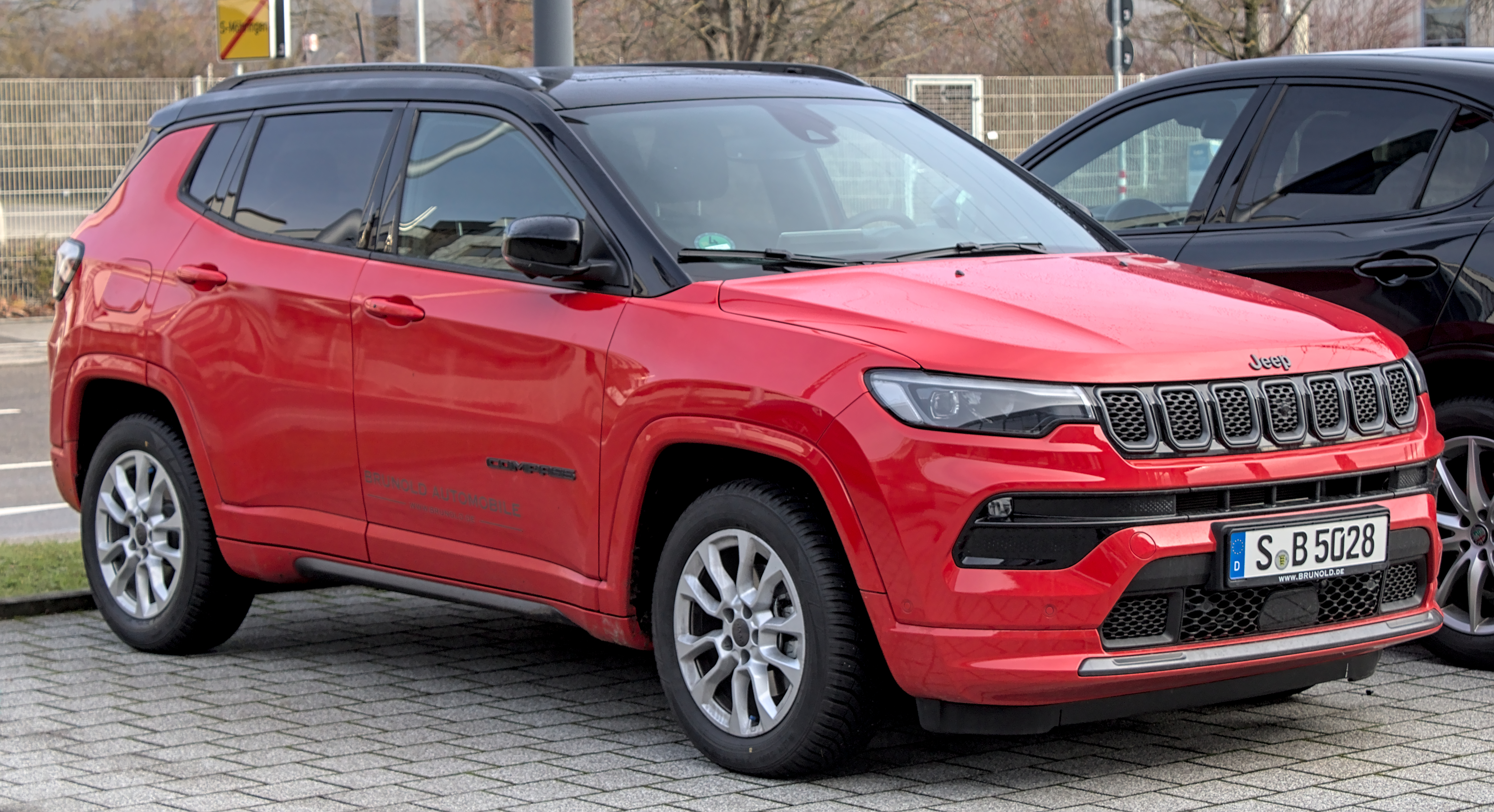
2021 Jeep Compass (Germany, facelift)

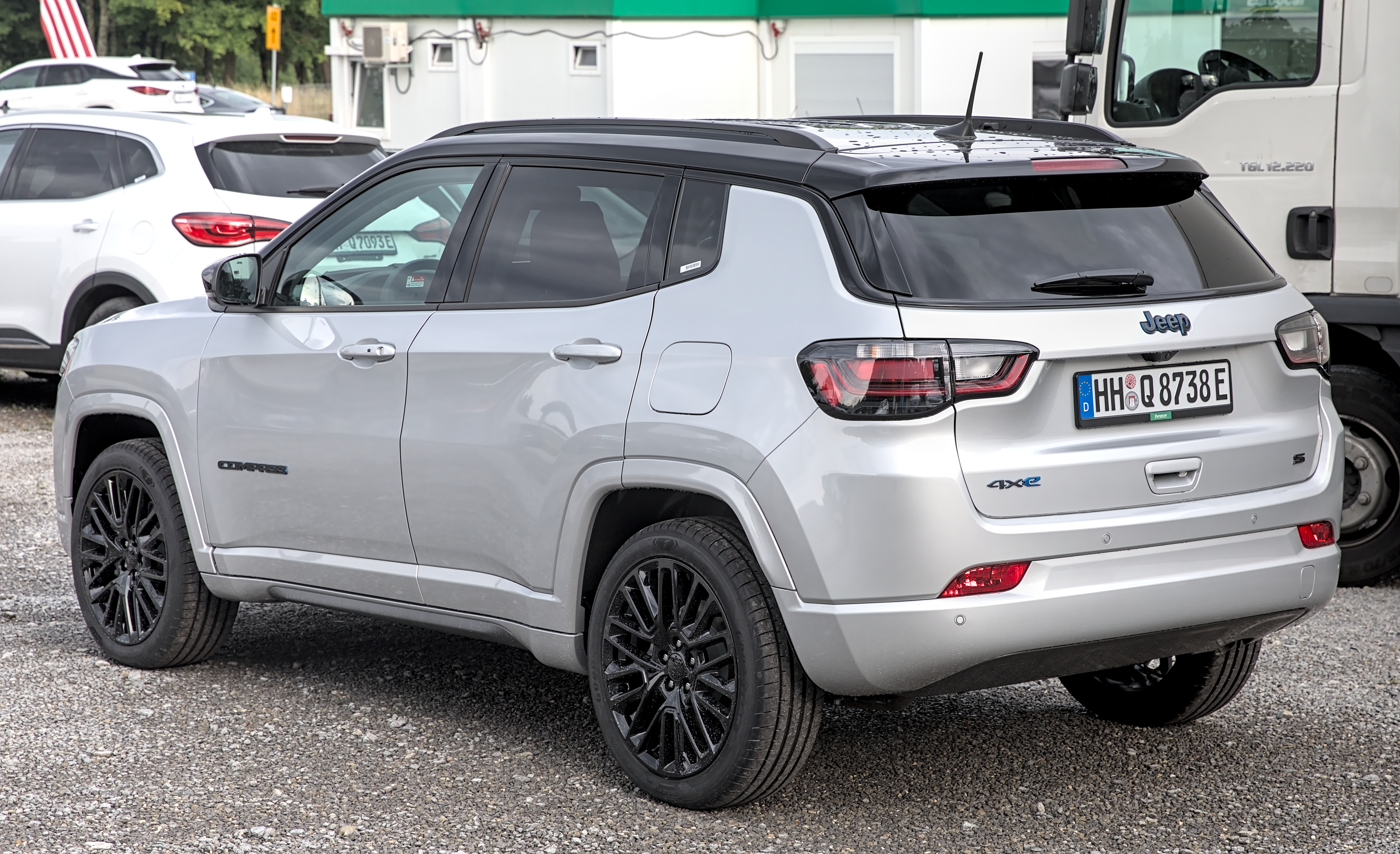
Jeep Compass 4xe (Germany, facelift)

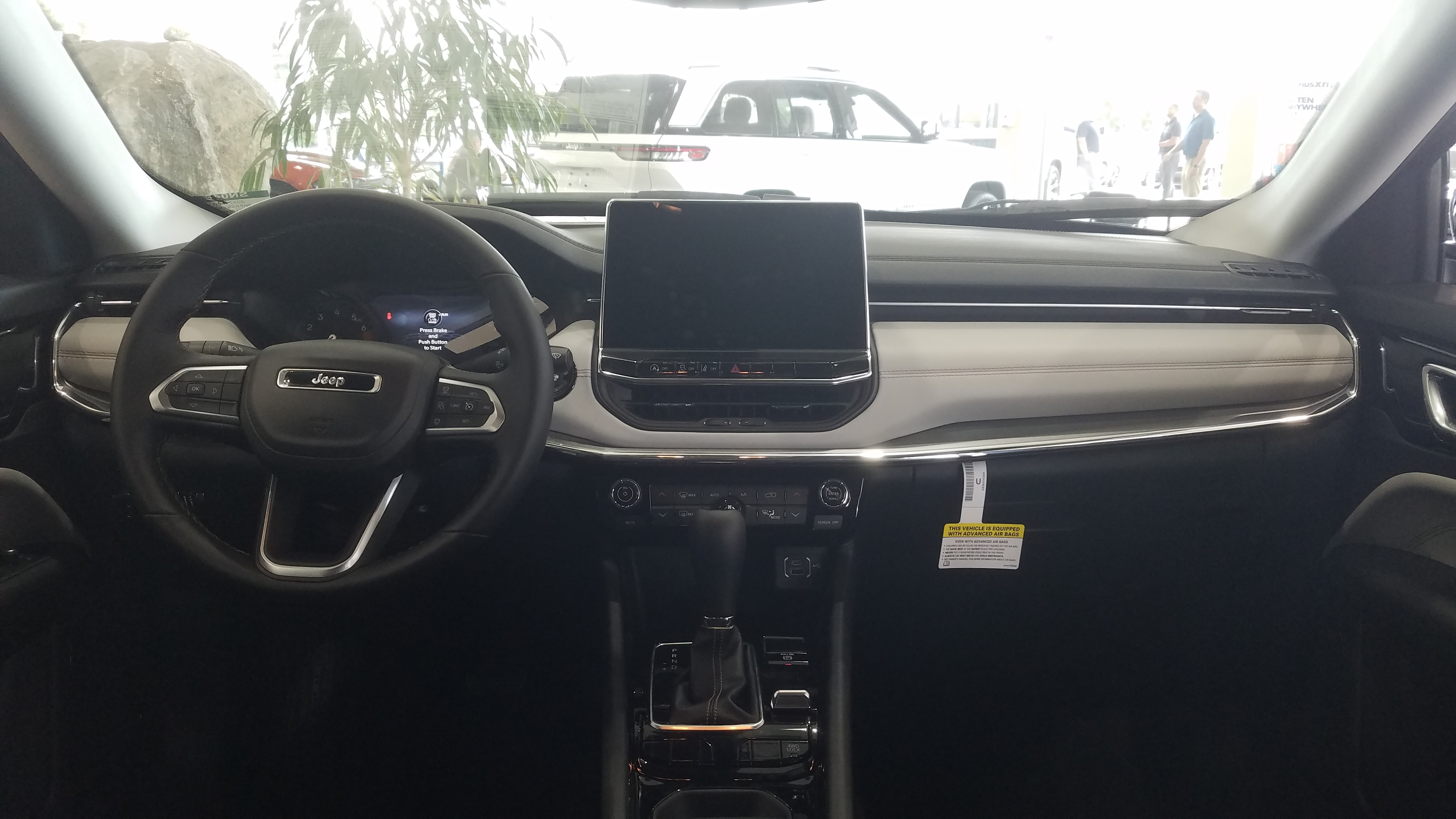
Interior (facelift)

=== Special editions ===
In addition to the standard trim levels, Altitude and High Altitude Special Editions are available for the Latitude and Limited trim levels, respectively, and added "blacked-out" exterior accents, black alloy wheels, as well as other features to their respective trim levels.

The Upland Special Edition model is also available for the base Sport trim level and adds black alloy wheels, blue accent trim for the exterior badging, Trailhawk-inspired exterior styling elements, and blue stitching on the interior. It is only available with four-wheel-drive (4WD), the 2.4 L I4 engine, and an automatic transmission.

An 80th Anniversary Edition version of the Latitude trim level, which adds unique exterior accents and a few extra features, was made available in September 2020 for the 2021 model year.

For 2022, Jeep unveiled a line of vehicles in partnership with Product Red, with each brand releasing a special-edition vehicle with (RED) branding. The Product Red Jeep Compass is based on the Limited trim level, and is available exclusively in Redline 3-Coat Pearl Metallic paired with a Black perforated leather-trimmed interior with red interior stitching. In addition, the Compass (RED) Edition includes special exterior badging and wheels from the Limited-based High Altitude Edition. In addition to a special-edition vehicle, Jeep will also release branded (RED) merchandise that will be available for purchase. Proceeds from each sale of a (RED)-branded vehicle will be donated to the Product Red Foundation.

Also in 2022, for the Indian market, Jeep released the Compass "5th Anniversary Edition", celebrating five years of the Compass in India. The car featured exclusive trim and alloy wheels, alongside a restyled interior.

=== Safety ===
==== ANCAP ====
ANCAP test results* Jeep Compass all variants (2017)
Test	Score
Overall	5 /5 stars
Frontal offset	14.93/16
Side impact	16/16
Pole	2/2
Seat belt reminders	3/3
Whiplash protection	Good
Pedestrian protection	Good
Electronic stability control	Standard

ANCAP test results* Jeep Compass See ANCAP Safety Report (2017)
Test	Score
Overall	5 /5 stars
Frontal offset	14.93/16
Side impact	16/16
Pole	2/2
Seat belt reminders	3/3
Whiplash protection	Good
Pedestrian protection	Good
Electronic stability control	Standard

==== Euro NCAP ====
Euro NCAP test results* Jeep Compass (2017)
Test	Points	%
Overall:	5 /5 stars	
Adult occupant:	34.5	90%
Child occupant:	40.7	83%
Pedestrian:	27.3	64%
Safety assist:	7.1	59%

==== IIHS ====
===== 2017 =====
IIHS (2017):
Small overlap front	Good
Moderate overlap front	Good
Side	Good
Roof strength (2016–present models)	Good
Head restraints & seats	Good

===== 2022 =====
The 2022 Compass was tested by the IIHS and its top trim earned a Top Safety Pick award:

IIHS scores
Small overlap front (Driver)	Good	
Small overlap front (Passenger)	Good	
Moderate overlap front	Good	
Side (original test)	Good	
Side (updated test)	Marginal	
Roof strength	Good	
Head restraints and seats	Good	
Headlights	Good / Acceptable / Marginal	varies by trim/option
Front crash prevention (Vehicle-to-Vehicle)	Superior	
Front crash prevention (Vehicle-to-Pedestrian, day)	Advanced	
Seat belt reminders	Marginal	
Child seat anchors (LATCH) ease of use	Marginal	

== Third generation (J4U/J4D; 2025) ==
Third generation

Overview
- Model code: J4U (Europe); J4D (North America)
- Production: 2025–present
- Assembly: Italy: Melfi, Potenza (SATA); United States: Belvidere, Illinois (Belvidere Assembly Plant)

Body and chassis
- Platform: STLA Medium
- Related: Peugeot 3008 III; Peugeot 5008 III; Opel Grandland II; Citroën C5 Aircross II

Powertrain
- Engine: Gasoline: 2.0 L Hurricane 4 EVO T I4 (North America); 1.2 L EB2DTS turbo I3 mild hybrid (Europe); 1.6 L EP6CDTX turbo I4 Hybrid (North America); Gasoline plug-in hybrid: 1.6 L EP6LTCHPD turbo I4 (Europe)
- Battery: 73.7 kWh (electric); 17.9 kWh (plug-in hybrid); 0.9 kWh (mild hybrid)

Dimensions
- Wheelbase: 2,795 mm (110.0 in)
- Length: 4,552 mm (179.2 in)
- Width: 1,928 mm (75.9 in)
- Height: 1,675 mm (65.9 in)
- Kerb weight: 1,674–2,161 kg (3,691–4,764 lb)

The third-generation Compass was unveiled on May 5, 2025. It is the first Jeep offered with the choice of mild hybrid, plug-in hybrid, and battery electric powertrains. Fabia Catone, head of Jeep Europe, said this ensures it is "capable of meeting 90% of segment demand" in Europe.

The third-generation Compass was designed in Turin, Italy, with the design team led by Daniele Calonaci, together with the Jeep style center in the United States. Calonaci's goal was to “make [the Compass] rugged, make it more bold but, at the same time, detoxify”. The Compass retains its seven-slot grille, trapezoidal wheel arches, and rugged styling; it also features X-shaped LED taillights which merge with the illuminated Jeep logo and the omission of chrome for ecological reasons. Additionally, the Compass features the modular anti-scratch shield and reinforced bumpers, while the vehicle's radar has been repositioned to prevent damage when driving through tight spaces or around obstacles.

Rear view

Compass 4xe

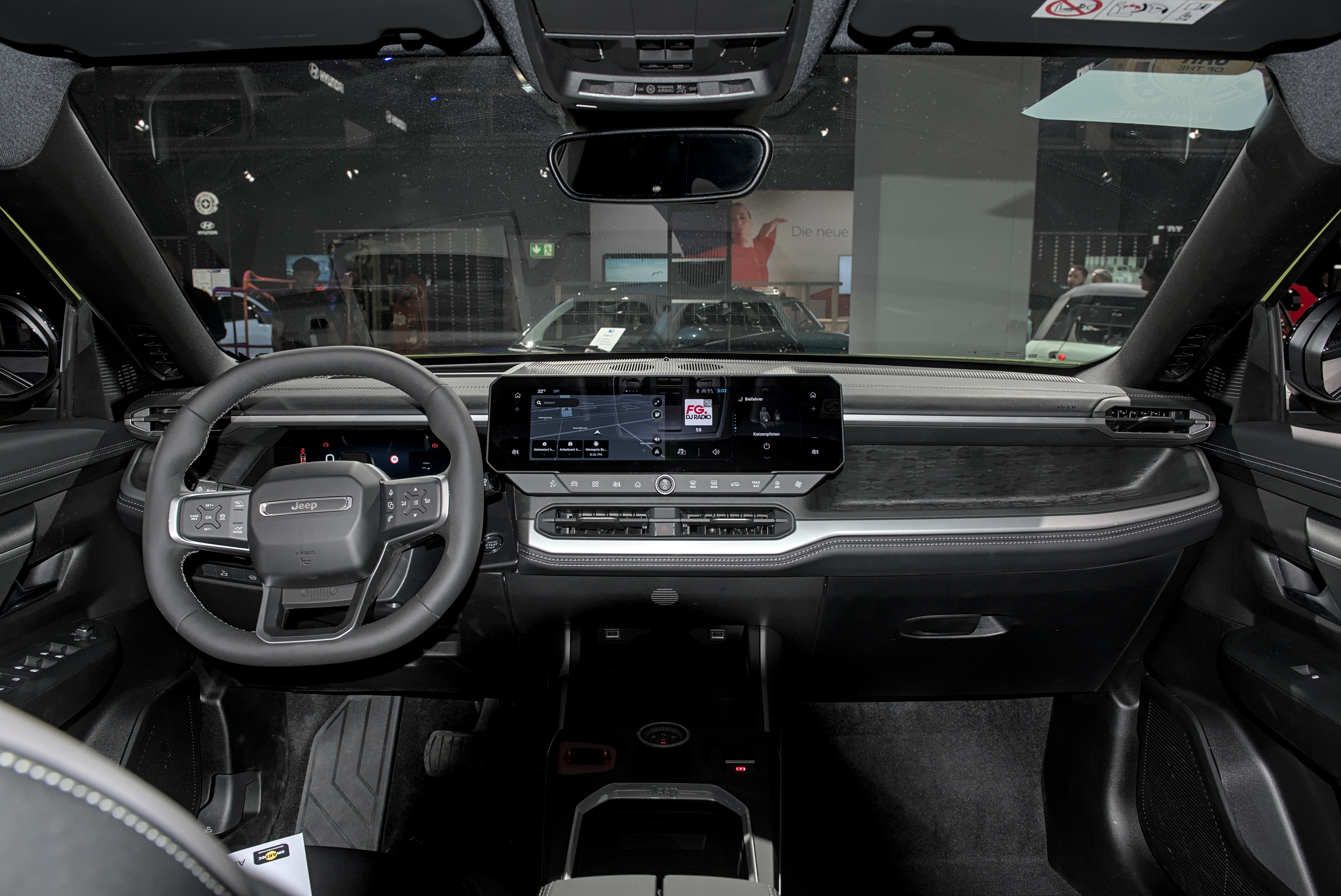
Interior

The third-generation Compass has a ground clearance of 7.9 in (200 mm) and a maximum wading depth of 18.5 in (470 mm). It also features shortened front and rear overhangs. Standard approach, breakover, and departure angles are 20, 15, and 26 degrees, respectively.

The model is equipped with a 10-inch digital instrument cluster and a 16-inch touchscreen infotainment system. Most of the interior controls are touchscreen-based including the shortcuts for the infotainment system and the controls on the steering wheel. There are a few physical controls such as the red switch used for the Terrain mode selector, a rotary dial used to control the automatic transmission and the electronic parking brake. The interior features a 34-liter front interior storage compartment, a cargo capacity of 19.4 cu ft (550 L), and the 40:20:40 split folding rear seats. Level 2 autonomous driving assistance is also an available feature.

=== Production ===
In November 2023, Stellantis announced that North American production of the next-generation Compass would take place at the Brampton Plant in Ontario, Canada, while European production will take place at the Stellantis plant in Melfi, Potenza, Italy. Stellantis also confirmed that the third-generation Compass is based on the STLA Medium platform, which underpins several Stellantis vehicles, including the Peugeot 5008 and the Opel Grandland. However, on October 14, 2025, Stellantis CEO Antonio Filosa announced that production of the North American Compass would instead be at Belvidere Assembly Plant in Belvidere, Illinois, starting in late 2026 or early 2027 as part of a $13 billion U.S. investment.

On October 14, 2025, Stellantis announced that production of the North American, third-generation Compass (J4U) would be moved to the Belvidere Assembly Plant, with production starting in December 2027 for the 2028 model year. The North American Compass (J4U) will launch with the 2.0-liter Hurricane 4 EVO turbo four-cylinder engine, while the hybrid version will come later with the setup from the Jeep Cherokee, the 1.6-liter EP6CDTX turbo four-cylinder engine. In August 2026, Stellantis refused to confirm to the Free Press if Belvidere would still build the Compass.

=== Safety ===
Euro NCAP test results Jeep Compass (2025)
Test	Points	%
Overall:	4 /5 stars	
Adult occupant:	32.3	80%
Child occupant:	42.0	85%
Pedestrian:	47.1	74%
Safety assist:	12.0	66%

== Sales ==
Year	U.S.	Canada	Mexico	China	Brazil	Argentina	Europe	Australia	India
2006	18,579	2,504	1,535				306		
2007	39,491	10,229	4,367				9,277		
2008	25,349	9,423	2,960				6,384		
2009	11,739	5,176	2,130				2,401		
2010	15,894	4,610	1,565				1,121		
2011	47,709	6,619	4,083				6,692		
2012	40,235	6,003	5,967		1,226		9,617	2,898	
2013	52,993	6,228	5,586		858		6,572	3,670	
2014	61,264	5,808	4,728		742		4,829	4,212	
2015	66,698	3,729	3,317		264		616	2,516	
2016	94,061	4,242	1,376	300	6,599		457	1,097	
2017	65,142	6,443	1,440	86,980	49,187		15,591	143	
2018	171,167	9,435	2,591	63,015	60,284	2,892	73,941	1,329	19,358
2019	143,934	7,652	2,209	35,746	60,362	3,440	64,714	818	16,079
2020	107,968	4,691	1,266	20,190	52,966	3,463	47,312		8,453
2021	75,642	5,931	1,172	8,991	70,923	4,053	54,738	1,363	11,652
2022	86,175	5,328	3,208		63,467	3,138	46,937	1,862	13,263
2023	96,173	6,206	4,147		59,118			1,455	4,054
2024	111,697	8,888			50,046				
2025	101,997	11,017			61,262				
