= List of Chrysler factories =

List of Chrysler factories contains all the vehicles manufactured by Chrysler LLC (currently "Stellantis North America") and the brands of the group before it merged with Fiat S.p.A. to form FCA.

This list only includes vehicles under the Chrysler, Jeep, Dodge, and Ram brands.

For a list of factories of other Stellantis brands, see list of Fiat Group assembly sites.

== Current factories ==
This list contains all current Stellantis North and South American factories.

Country	Name	Location	Date opened	Current products	VIN code (Note: The eleventh character of the vehicle identification number (VIN) indicates the factory the car has been built in.)
Canada	Brampton Assembly	Brampton	1986	Currently vacant	H
Canada	Etobicoke Casting	Toronto	1942	Aluminum die castings; Engine and transmission parts	–
Canada	Windsor Assembly	Windsor	1928	Chrysler Pacifica; Chrysler Voyager/Grand Caravan; Dodge Charger	R
Mexico	Saltillo Engine	Saltillo	1981	Chrysler Hemi engine; Stellantis Hurricane engine	–
Mexico	Saltillo South Engine	Saltillo	2010	Chrysler Pentastar engine	–
Mexico	Saltillo Stamping	Saltillo	1997	Metal stampings	–
Mexico	Saltillo Truck Assembly	Saltillo	1995	Ram Heavy Duty	G
Mexico	Saltillo Van Assembly	Saltillo	2013	Ram ProMaster	E
Mexico	Toluca Assembly	Toluca	1968	Jeep Compass; Jeep Wagoneer S; Jeep Recon; Jeep Cherokee	T
Mexico	Toluca Stamping Facility	Toluca	1994	Metal stampings	–
United States	Detroit Assembly Complex – Jefferson	Detroit, Michigan	1991	Jeep Grand Cherokee; Dodge Durango	C
United States	Detroit Assembly Complex – Mack	Detroit, Michigan	1953	Jeep Grand Cherokee	8
United States	Dundee Engine Plant	Dundee, Michigan	2002	Chrysler Pentastar engine	–
United States	Indiana Transmission	Kokomo, Indiana	1998	6- and 9-speed automatic transmissions	–
United States	Kokomo Engine Plant	Kokomo, Indiana	2003	Global Medium Engine	–
United States	Kokomo Casting	Kokomo, Indiana	1965	Engine blocks; transmission cases and aluminum components	–
United States	Kokomo Transmission	Kokomo, Indiana	1956	8-speed automatic transmissions; Machined components for 9-speed automatic transmission	–
United States	Mount Elliott Tool and Die	Detroit, Michigan	1938	Tools and dies, checking fixtures, stamping fixtures	–
United States	Sterling Heights Assembly	Sterling Heights, Michigan	1953	Ram 1500	N
United States	Sterling Stamping	Sterling Heights, Michigan	1965	Metal stampings	–
United States	Tipton Transmission	Tipton, Indiana	2014	9-speed automatic transmissions	–
United States	Toledo Machining	Perrysburg, Ohio	1967	Steering columns; torque converters	–
United States	Toledo North	Toledo, Ohio	2001	Jeep Wrangler	W
United States	Toledo South	Toledo, Ohio	1942	Jeep Gladiator	L
United States	Trenton Engine Complex	Trenton, Michigan	1952	Chrysler Pentastar engine	–
United States	Warren Stamping	Warren, Michigan	1949	Metal stampings	–
United States	Warren Truck Assembly	Warren, Michigan	1938	Jeep Wagoneer/Grand Wagoneer	S, T, V

== Closed factories ==
Country	Name	Location	Date Opened	Date Closed	Products Produced	VIN and Notes
Argentina	Chrysler Fevre	San Justo	1959	1980	Cars, trucks	Sold to VW in 1980. Closed by VW in 1987. Current seat of National University of La Matanza.
Argentina	Chrysler Fevre	Monte Chingolo	1969	1980	Dodge D-Series Trucks, Dodge 1500	Purchased from Siam Automotores. Sold to VW in 1980. Closed by VW in the early 1990s.
Argentina	Chrysler Argentina	Córdoba	1997	2001	Jeep Cherokee (XJ), Jeep Grand Cherokee (ZJ), Jeep Grand Cherokee (WJ)	2
Australia	Chrysler Australia	Keswick, South Australia	1951	1964	Engines and body parts	
Australia	Chrysler Australia Tonsley Park plant	Clovelly Park, South Australia	1964	1980	Cars	Sold to Mitsubishi Motors in 1980. Chrysler production ended in 1981.
Australia	Chrysler Australia Lonsdale plant	Lonsdale, South Australia	1968	1980	Engines and components	Sold to Mitsubishi Motors in 1980.
Australia	Chrysler Australia	Fishermans Bend, Victoria	1965	1972	Engines and body parts	
Belgium	Chrysler Antwerpen	Antwerp	1926	1958	Assembly of CKD American models for Europe and Middle East	
Brazil	Chrysler do Brasil Ltda.	Sao Bernardo do Campo, São Paulo	1969	1981	Simca Esplanada/Simca Regente/Simca GTX, Dodge Dart, Dodge Magnum, Dodge LeBaron, Dodge Charger, Dodge 1800, Dodge Polara	VW bought 67% of Chrysler Motors do Brazil in 1979 & it then bought the rest in 1980. Chrysler models were phased out by 1981.
Brazil	Chrysler Brazil	Campo Largo, Paraná	1998	2001	Dodge Dakota	3
Brazil	Tritec Motors Ltda.	Campo Largo, Paraná	1999	2007	Tritec engine	Originally established as a 50/50 joint venture between Chrysler and BMW to build the jointly developed Tritec engine. BMW used the engine in the MINI. In 2007, BMW sold its 50% stake to what was by then DaimlerChrysler and stopped using the Tritec engine. Production ended in 2007. In 2008, the plant and the engine were sold to Fiat, which updated the engine into the E.torQ engine. Became part of Fiat Chrysler Automobiles. Now part of Stellantis along with Fiat and Chrysler.
Canada	Tecumseh Road	Windsor, Ontario	1925	1978 (production ended); 1983	Dodge D-Series Trucks	Originally a Chalmers plant in 1916, then Maxwell-Chalmers, then Chrysler Canada in 1925. Became Windsor Plant 1. Converted to truck production in 1931 until 1978 and then idled; from 1980 to 1983 serving as the Imperial Quality Assurance Center then closed.
Canada	Windsor Engine	Windsor, Ontario	1938	1980	Inline 6 and V8 engines	Also called Windsor Plant 2.
Canada	Brampton Assembly (AMC)	Brampton, Ontario	1960	1992	AMC Eagle, Eagle Wagon, Jeep Wrangler (YJ)	Located at Kennedy Road/Steeles Avenue. Acquired as part of Chrysler's takeover of American Motors.
Canada	Pillette Road Truck Assembly	Windsor, Ontario	1974	2003	Dodge Ram Van, Plymouth Voyager	K Also called Windsor Plant 6. Demolished and is now a Chrysler warehouse – the Chrysler Logistics Centre.
Colombia	Colmotores-Chrysler	Bogotá	1965	1979	Dodge Coronet 440; Dodge Coronet; Dodge Polara; Dodge Dart; Dodge Alpine; Dodge D series Trucks	Chrysler bought 60% of Colmotores in 1965. Chrysler sold their stake in Colmotores to General Motors in 1979. Plant is still open today as GM Colmotores.
France	Poissy Assembly	Poissy	1958	1978	inherited Simca range, Chrysler 180, Simca 1307, Simca Horizon	ex Simca, sold to Groupe PSA in 1978 and still open. Now part of Stellantis along with Chrysler.
Mexico	Lago Alberto Assembly	Mexico City	1930s	2002	Trucks	M
Netherlands	Rotterdam Assembly	Rotterdam	1958	1970	Assembly of CKD American models for Europe; Simca models	Originally opened by Kaiser-Frazer in 1949. Was called NEKAF – Nederlandse Kaiser-Frazer Fabrieken N.V. Purchased from Kaiser-Frazer in 1958. Replaced the Antwerp plant.
South Africa	Chrysler South Africa	Elsie's River, Cape Town	1956	1975	Assembly of CKD, various Chrysler, Dodge & Plymouth models with right-hand drive configuration	
Spain	Madrid-Villaverde Assembly	Villaverde, Madrid	1965	1978	Barreiros trucks, Dodge Dart, Dodge 3700, Simca 1100, Simca 1200, Chrysler 180, Simca 1307, Simca 1500	ex Barreiros, sold to Groupe PSA 1978 and still open. Now part of Stellantis along with Chrysler. Plant is building the new Citroën C4.
United Kingdom	Biscot Road plant	Luton, Bedfordshire	1964	?	truck axles and gearboxes	ex Rootes Group 1964, formerly the main Commer plant. Closed
United Kingdom	Dunstable Assembly	Dunstable, Bedfordshire	1964	1978	Commer FC, Commer Walk-Thru, Commer V- and C-series Maxiload, Karrier Bantam, Karrier Gamecock, Dodge 500, Dodge 100 "Commando"	ex Rootes Group 1964, sold to Groupe PSA 1978 but re-sold to Renault, closed 1992
United Kingdom	Kew Assembly	Kew, London	1920s	1967	CKD American cars until 1930s, trucks including Dodge 100 "Kew", Dodge 300, Dodge 500, Dodge D series (medium duty) and Fargo derivatives	early car production included Chrysler, DeSoto and Dodge models, closed when production switched to former Rootes plant at Dunstable
United Kingdom	Linwood Assembly	Linwood, Renfrewshire, Scotland	1964	1978	Hillman Imp and derivatives, Rootes Arrow range, Chrysler Avenger, Chrysler Sunbeam	ex Rootes Group 1964, sold to Groupe PSA 1978, closed 1981
United Kingdom	Maidstone plant	Maidstone, Kent	1964	?	truck engines	ex Rootes Group in 1964, formerly the Tilling-Stevens plant. Closed 1970s
United Kingdom	Ryton Assembly	Ryton-on-Dunsmore, Warwickshire	1964	1978	Hillman Minx/Super Minx/Husky and derivatives, Sunbeam Rapier, Humber Hawk/Super Snipe, Rootes Arrow range, Hillman Avenger, Chrysler Alpine, also Chrysler-designed Talbot Horizon from 1980	ex Rootes Group 1964, sold to Groupe PSA 1978, closed 2006. Last model built at the plant was the Peugeot 206. Demolished 2007–2008. Part of the site is now used by Jaguar Land Rover's Special Vehicle Operations division and is referred to as the "Oxford Road" site.
United Kingdom	Stoke plant	Stoke Aldermoor, Coventry	1964	1978	engines, components, Rootes Group headquarters	ex Rootes Group 1964, formerly adjacent Hillman and Humber plants. Sold to Groupe PSA 1978, closed
United Kingdom	Whitley Development site	Whitley, Coventry	1969	1978	Chrysler Europe design and engineering headquarters	Former Hawker Siddeley missile plant purchased in 1969, sold to Groupe PSA 1978 and re-sold to Jaguar Cars in 1985.
United States	Belvidere Assembly Plant	Belvidere, Illinois	1965	2023	Jeep Cherokee (KL)	D Includes Belvidere Satellite Stamping Plant.
United States	Conner Avenue Assembly	Detroit, Michigan	1966	2017	Dodge Viper 1996 GTS coupe & 1997–2017 (all Vipers); Viper V10 engine 2001–2017; Plymouth Prowler; Chrysler Prowler	V Closed 31 August 2017
United States	DeSoto Wyoming Ave	Detroit, Michigan	1934	1960	DeSoto cars	
United States	Detroit Axle (Eldon Avenue Gear and Axle)	Detroit, Michigan	1917	2010	Axles and differentials	On July 15, 1970 black employee James Johnson shot and killed two white foremen and a job setter at this plant. Earlier that day he had been fired in retaliation for bringing a grievance of racially motivated mistreatment by his supervisor. A jury later acquitted him by reason of temporary insanity. Johnson was unaffiliated with the revolutionary union movements that had been agitating for better working conditions for black employees in Detroit area auto plants at the time.
United States	Dodge Main	Hamtramck, Michigan	1914	1980	Dodge Brothers cars/trucks; "A" Body, "B" Body, "E" Body, "F" Body	Was the original Dodge Brothers facility. Location repurposed as GM Detroit/Hamtramck Assembly
United States	Evansville Assembly Plant	Evansville, Indiana	1919	1959	Graham Bros. Trucks, Dodge Trucks & Automobiles, Plymouth Automobiles, .45 Calibre automatic ammunition, hulls for Grumman UF-1 amphibious flying boat	Produced 1,000,000th Plymouth car in 1953. Production moved to new Fenton, Missouri plant in 1959 to take advantage of lower transportation costs.
United States	Highland Park Chrysler Plant	Highland Park, Michigan	1925	1990	Chrysler Airflow, Chrysler Imperial Airflow, DeSoto Airflow	
United States	Huber Foundry	Detroit, Michigan	1966	1982	heavy castings	
United States	Indianapolis Foundry	Indianapolis, Indiana	1890	2005	Cast iron engine blocks	
United States	Jefferson Avenue Assembly	Detroit, Michigan	1907	1990	Various models from Chrysler, DeSoto, Dodge, and Plymouth	C
United States	Kenosha Main/Lakefront/Engine	Kenosha, Wisconsin	1917	2010	L body, M body, Engines Jeep 2.5, Jeep 4.0, Chrysler 2.7, Chrysler 3.5	W (M-body). Y (L-body). Acquired as part of Chrysler's takeover of American Motors.
United States	Los Angeles (Maywood) Assembly	City of Commerce, California	1920s	1971	"A" Body, "B" Body, "E" Body	
United States	Lynch Road Assembly	Detroit, Michigan	1928	1981	Various models from Chrysler, DeSoto, Dodge, and Plymouth	A
United States	San Leandro Assembly	San Leandro, California	1948	1954	Dodge and Plymouth cars	Plant sold to International Harvester in 1955, then sold to Caterpillar in 1970. Current location of Westgate Center Shopping Center at 1933 Davis Street, San Leandro, CA 94577
United States	Mound Road Engine	Detroit, Michigan	1953	2002	Chrysler A engine, 3.9L V6, 318/5.2L V8, 340 V8, 8.0L Magnum V10, Viper V10 Engine 1992–2001	Was located at 20300 Mound Road. Factory acquired from Briggs Manufacturing Company in 1953. Plant demolished in 2003. Now a storage area for vehicles built at Warren Assembly.
United States	Newark Assembly	Newark, Delaware	1951	2008	Dodge Durango; Chrysler Aspen	F
United States	Saint Louis Assembly North	Fenton, Missouri	1966	2009	Chrysler Fifth Avenue, Dodge Diplomat, Plymouth Gran Fury, "S" Body (minivans), "AS" Body (minivans), Dodge Ram	X (through 1995), J (1996 and later)
United States	Saint Louis Assembly South	Fenton, Missouri	1959	2008	Chrysler LeBaron, Dodge Diplomat, Dodge Aries, Plymouth Reliant, Dodge 400, Dodge 600 coupe & convertible, Dodge Daytona, Chrysler Laser, Chrysler minivans (NS), Chrysler minivans (RS), Chrysler minivans (RT)	G (through 1991), B (1996 and later). (Plant was idled between 1991 and 1996.)
United States	Graham Brothers Dodge Plant	Stockton, California	1926	1954	Dodge B Series, Plymouth Model U (located at 1400 Waterloo Road)	
United States	Twinsburg Stamping	Twinsburg, Ohio	1957	2010	Metal stampings	
United States	Winfield Foundry	Detroit, Michigan	1963	1982	Heavy castings	
Venezuela	Chrysler de Venezuela SA Caracas Assembly	Caracas	1957	1965	Trucks	Originally Ensamblaje Venezolana SA, which was owned by the Phelps family. Bought by Chrysler in 1957. Replaced by Valencia plant.
Venezuela	Chrysler de Venezuela SA Valencia Plant	Valencia, Carabobo	1965	1979	Dodge Dart; Dodge Coronet; Dodge Monaco; Chrysler LeBaron; Dodge Aspen; Dodge D series Trucks	Sold to General Motors in 1979.

== Joint-ventures ==
Country	Name	Location	Date Opened	Current Products	VIN and Owners
Egypt	Arab American Vehicles	Cairo	1977	Jeep CJ7-CJ8; Jeep YJ-YJL; Jeep Liberty KJ; Jeep KK; Jeep J8; Jeep TJL; Jeep JKU; Jeep Grand Cherokee WK2	4; 51% AOI; 49% Chrysler LLC

== See also ==
- List of former automotive manufacturing facilities
- History of Chrysler
- List of Mazda facilities
- List of Ford factories
- List of General Motors factories
- List of Volkswagen Group factories
