= Stellantis =

Multinational automotive car manufacturing corporation

Stellantis N.V.
- Type: Public
- Traded as: BIT: STLAM; Euronext Paris: STLAP; NYSE: STLA; FTSE MIB component (STLAM); CAC 40 component (STLAP)
- ISIN: NL00150001Q9
- Industry: Automotive
- Predecessors: Fiat Chrysler Automobiles; PSA Group
- Founded: 17 January 2021; 5 years ago
- Headquarters: Hoofddorp, North Holland, Netherlands
- Area served: Worldwide
- Key people: John Elkann (chairman); Robert Peugeot (vice chairman); Antonio Filosa (CEO)
- Production output: ▲5.600 million vehicles (2025)
- Brands: Abarth; Alfa Romeo; Chrysler; Citroën; Dodge; DS Automobiles; Fiat; Jeep; Lancia; Maserati; Opel; Peugeot; Ram Trucks; Vauxhall
- Revenue: ▼€156.9 billion (2024)
- Operating income: ▼€3.69 billion (2024)
- Net income: ▼€5.52 billion (2024)
- Total assets: ▼€195.2 billion (2025)
- Total equity: ▼€54.0 billion (2025)
- Owners: Exor NV (Agnelli family) (15.5%); Peugeot Invest SA (7.74%); Bpifrance SA (6.65%)
- Number of employees: 248,243 (2024)
- Subsidiaries: List: Stellantis Argentina; Stellantis Australia and New Zealand; Stellantis France; Sevel; Stellantis Gurun (Malaysia); Stellantis India; Stellantis Italy; Fiat Professional; FCA Heritage; Stellantis North America; Mopar; SRT; Stellantis Canada; Stellantis Pro One; FCA Poland; Fiat India Automobiles (50%); Fiat Ireland; Free2Move; Share Now; Citroën Chile; Citroën India; Comau; Stellantis Financial Services; aiMotive; Centro Ricerche FIAT; PCMA; Teksid (84.8%); Fiat Serbia (67%); Leapmotor (18.99%); Leapmotor International (51%); Dongfeng Peugeot-Citroën (50%); Emotors (50%); IKAP (50%); Leasys (50%); PSA AVTEC (50%); SAIPA Citroën (50%); Tofaş (37%); Berjaya Auto Alliance (29%)
- Website: stellantis.com

Stellantis N.V. is a multinational automotive manufacturing corporation formed in 2021 through the merger of the French PSA Group and Italian-American Fiat Chrysler Automobiles (FCA), which was itself created by the merger of Italy's Fiat S.p.A. and the US-based Chrysler, completed in stages between 2009 and 2014. Stellantis is headquartered in Hoofddorp, Netherlands, while the CEO now operates from Auburn Hills, Michigan, United States.

The company designs, manufactures, and markets vehicles under 14 brands: Abarth, Alfa Romeo, Chrysler, Citroën, Dodge, DS Automobiles, Fiat, Jeep, Lancia, Maserati, Opel, Peugeot, Ram, and Vauxhall. At the time of the merger, Stellantis employed approximately 300,000 people, with manufacturing operations in 30 countries and a commercial presence in over 130 markets worldwide.

== Etymology ==
The company says the name Stellantis is derived from the Latin verb stello 'to brighten with stars'. The present participle stellans means "starry" or "starlike". "N.V." stands for naamloze vennootschap, a publicly traded company, equivalent to the British "PLC" or French "S.A.".

== History ==
In early 2019, Fiat Chrysler Automobiles (FCA) pursued a merger with French automaker Renault, reaching a provisional agreement. However, the deal collapsed due to political concerns from the French government and resistance from Renault's alliance partner, Nissan. FCA subsequently turned to another French automaker, the PSA Group, and in December 2019, the two companies agreed to merge, forming the world's fourth-largest automaker by global vehicle sales, with projected annual cost savings of €3.7 billion, or about US$4.22 billion.

The European Commission approved the merger on 21 December 2020 with minimal conditions. Shareholders of both companies approved the deal on 4 January 2021, and the merger was completed on 16 January 2021. The combined entity was renamed Stellantis N.V. on 17 January, with shares beginning to trade under the symbol "STLA" on the Milan Stock Exchange and Euronext Paris on 18 January and on the New York Stock Exchange on 19 January. For accounting purposes, PSA was designated the acquirer, and financial statements reflect PSA's historical performance.

Following the merger, the largest shareholders of Stellantis were EXOR NV, the investment company of the Agnelli family, the founders of Fiat, with a 14.2% stake; Peugeot Invest, the Peugeot family's holding company, with 7%; and Bpifrance, the French state-owned investment bank, with 6%.

Carlos Tavares, the CEO of PSA Group, was appointed CEO of Stellantis with a five-year term. Immediately following the merger, Tavares announced plans to offer 29 electrified vehicle models by the end of 2021 and to invest over €30 billion in electrification and software by the end of the decade.

In response to the global semiconductor shortage that forced the company to slow or stop production at its plants, Stellantis signed a partnership with Foxconn in 2021 to co-develop automotive chips, and in 2023, the two companies launched a joint venture called SiliconAuto, based in the Netherlands.

In 2022, Stellantis halted Russian operations due to sanctions related to the invasion of Ukraine. In early 2024, Russian partners began producing Citroën-branded vehicles at the Kaluga plant, prompting Stellantis to state it had "lost control" of its assets in Russia.

In 2022, Stellantis established the electric vehicle battery joint ventures NextStar Energy with LG Energy Solution in Canada and StarPlus Energy with Samsung SDI in the US. NextStar was dissolved in February 2026.

Stellantis also faced legal and regulatory scrutiny. In May 2022, the company pleaded guilty to criminal charges and paid $300 million to settle a U.S. Department of Justice investigation into diesel emissions fraud affecting over 100,000 vehicles.

The company continued expanding its mobility and autonomous technology portfolio, acquiring carsharing platform Share Now in July 2022 and autonomous driving startup aiMotive in November 2022.

In October 2023, Stellantis acquired a 20% stake in Chinese EV manufacturer Leapmotor for €1.5 billion, forming a joint venture, Leapmotor International, to handle global sales and production outside China.

The company announced a €3 billion (US$3.2 billion) share buyback in 2024.

Under the leadership of Tavares, Stellantis faced mounting criticism over its cost-cutting strategy, declining sales, and strained relationships with key stakeholders. Tavares implemented aggressive restructuring measures, including workforce reductions and tight control over product development, which some analysts blamed for delays in new model launches and weakening brand performance, particularly in North America. U.S. dealers expressed concern about rising inventories and brand mismanagement, while the United Auto Workers criticized the company over job cuts and halted investment plans. Stellantis reported a 70% drop in net profit in 2024, with global shipments and U.S. market share declining significantly. Amid internal friction with the board and worsening financial performance, Tavares resigned in December 2024, two years before his contract was set to expire.

On 28 May 2025, the board unanimously appointed Antonio Filosa, a longtime executive who had led Stellantis operations in North and South America, as CEO, effective 23 June 2025. Filosa is expected to place renewed emphasis on the North American market.

In May 2026, the company announced it will manufacture Peugeot and Jeep vehicles in China following a deal with Dongfeng Motor Corporation. In July 2026, within the framework of the Dieselgate scandal, the British courts rejected the accusations against five manufacturers, including Peugeot-Citroën, finding in their favor. In August 2026, Stellantis returned to operating profit in the first half of 2026, but profitability per car still remains quite low.

== Brands ==
The active brand portfolio of Stellantis as of 2025 is shown below. This list does not contain any discontinued brands owned by the company which have been placed into dormancy either directly or by its predecessor organizations.

Brand	Origin	Established	Brand CEO
Abarth	Italy	1949	Arnaud Belloni
Alfa Romeo	Italy	1910	Santo Ficili
Chrysler	United States	1925	Matt McAlear
Citroën	France	1919	Xavier Chardon
Dodge	United States	1914	Matt McAlear
DS Automobiles	France	2014	Xavier Chardon
Fiat	Italy	1899	Arnaud Belloni
Jeep	United States	1943	Branden Coté
Lancia	Italy	1906	Arnaud Belloni
Maserati	Italy	1914	Jean-Philippe Imparato
Opel	Germany	1862	Florian Huettl
Peugeot	France	1810	Alain Favey
Ram	United States	2010	Matt VanDyke
Vauxhall	United Kingdom	1857	Florian Huettl

== Leadership ==
=== Senior management ===
- Chairman: John Elkann (since January 2021)
- Vice chairman: Robert Peugeot (since January 2021)
- Chief executive: Antonio Filosa (since June 2025)

== Positions on environmental regulations ==
Stellantis stated that it supports the Trump administration's proposal to repeal the 2009 Endangerment Finding and all greenhouse gas emissions standards for motor vehicles, which would also repeal all federal regulation of GHGs across all sectors of the economy. Stellantis endorsed the Transportation Freedom Act in March 2025, a bill that would weaken and repeal many emissions regulations governing passenger vehicles in the United States. The bill sought to strip California of its authority to enforce the Advanced Clean Cars II policy, which required manufacturers to achieve 100% ZEV sales in participating states by 2035. According to the Alliance for Automotive Innovation, about 30% of the US vehicle market was regulated by ACC II, which is significantly lower than the company's stated decarbonization target for the US.

The company opposed Canada's Electric Vehicle Availability Standard in a December 2025 letter to PM Mark Carney and an October 2025 testimony in the House of Commons.

Although Stellantis CEO Carlos Tavares supported a phase-out date of internal combustion engine vehicles by 2035 in statements made in February 2024, the company advocated for flexibilities for meeting the 2025 targets in EU's CO_{2} emissions standards for cars and vans in early 2025.

== Current assembly plants ==
=== Africa ===
Country	Name	Location	Date opened	Current products	Operator
Egypt	AAV (Cairo Plant)	Cairo	April 2025	Citroën C4 X	Arab American Vehicles (51% Arab Organization for Industrialization (AOI); 49% Stellantis)
Algeria	Tafraoui Plant	Tafraoui	December 2023	Fiat Doblò; Fiat Grande Panda	Stellantis Algérie
Morocco	Kenitra Plant	Ameur Seflia	June 2019	Citroën Ami; Fiat Topolino; Opel Rocks Electric; Peugeot 208	Stellantis Morocco
Nigeria	DPAN (Kaduna Plant)	Kaduna	2016	Peugeot 301; Peugeot 3008	Dangote Peugeot Automobiles Nigeria Ltd.

=== Asia ===
Country	Name	Location	Date opened	Current products
China (Dongfeng JV)	Wuhan Plant	Wuhan	1992	Peugeot 408 (saloon); Peugeot 508
China (Dongfeng JV)	Chengdu Plant	Chengdu	2016	Citroën C5 X; Citroën C5 Aircross
India	Hosur Plant (AVTEC JV)	Hosur	2017	Powertrains
India	Ranjangaon Plant (Tata JV)	Ranjangaon	January 1997	Jeep Compass; Tata Nexon; Tata Altroz; Jeep Meridian/Commander; Jeep Wrangler; Jeep Grand Cherokee; Tata Curvv
India	Thiruvallur Plant	Thiruvallur	2020	Citroën C3; Citroën ë-C3; Citroën C3 Aircross; Citroën C5 Aircross
Malaysia	Gurun Plant	Gurun	2002	Peugeot 2008; Peugeot 3008; Peugeot 408; Peugeot 5008; Leapmotor C10
Turkey (Koç JV)	Bursa Plant	Bursa	1971	Fiat Tipo/Egea

=== Europe ===
Country	Name	Location	Date opened	Current products	VIN code
France	Douvrin Plant	Douvrin	1969	Electric batteries	
France	Mulhouse Plant	Sausheim	1972	Peugeot 308; Peugeot 408	Y
France	Poissy Plant	Poissy	1940	DS 3; Opel Mokka	W
France	Rennes Plant	Chartres-de-Bretagne	1961	Citroën C5 Aircross	-
France	Sochaux Plant	Sochaux	1912	Peugeot 3008; Peugeot 5008	S
France	Hordain Plant	Hordain/Lieu-Saint-Amand	1993	Citroën SpaceTourer/Jumpy/Dispatch; Fiat Ulysse/Scudo; Opel/Vauxhall Zafira Life/Vivaro; Peugeot Traveller/Expert; Toyota ProAce (Verso)	Z
Germany	Eisenach Plant	Eisenach	1990	Opel Grandland	6
Germany	Kaiserslautern Plant	Kaiserslautern	1966	Components; Engines	-
Germany	Rüsselsheim Plant	Rüsselsheim am Main	1898	DS N°4; Opel Astra	1
Hungary	Szentgotthárd Plant	Szentgotthárd	1990	Engines; Transmissions	S
Italy	Mirafiori Plant	Turin	1939	Fiat New 500	X
Italy	Cassino Plant	Piedimonte San Germano	1972	Alfa Romeo Giulia; Alfa Romeo Stelvio; Maserati Grecale	7
Italy	Modena Plant	Modena	1940	Maserati MC20; Maserati GranTurismo/GranCabrio	M
Italy	Pomigliano Plant	Pomigliano d'Arco	1968	Alfa Romeo Tonale; Fiat Panda	3
Italy	Melfi Plant	San Nicola di Melfi	1993	Jeep Compass; DS Nº7; DS N°8; Lancia Gamma	P
Italy	Atessa Plant	Atessa	1981	Fiat Ducato; Citroën Jumper/Peugeot Boxer; Opel/Vauxhall Movano; Toyota ProAce Max	2
Poland	Gliwice Plant	Gliwice	1998	Fiat Ducato; Citroën Jumper/Peugeot Boxer; Opel/Vauxhall Movano; Toyota ProAce Max	G
Poland	Tychy Engine Plant	Tychy	1996	Engines	
Poland	Tychy Plant	Tychy	1992	Alfa Romeo Junior; Fiat 600; Jeep Avenger	J
Portugal	Mangualde Plant	Mangualde	1962	Citroën Berlingo; Fiat Doblò; Opel/Vauxhall Combo; Peugeot Rifter/Partner	-
Serbia	Kragujevac Plant	Kragujevac	2008	Fiat Grande Panda; Citroën C3	Z
Slovakia	Trnava Plant	Trnava	2006	Citroën C3; Citroën C3 Aircross; Opel Frontera; Peugeot 208	T
Spain	Madrid Plant	Villaverde (Madrid)	1951	Citroën C4	-
Spain	Vigo Plant	Vigo	1958	Peugeot 2008; Citroën Berlingo; Fiat Doblò; Opel/Vauxhall Combo; Peugeot Rifter/Partner	J
Spain	Zaragoza Plant	Figueruelas	1982	Lancia Ypsilon; Opel Corsa; Peugeot 208; Leapmotor B05	4
United Kingdom	Ellesmere Port Plant	Ellesmere Port	1962	Citroën Berlingo; Fiat Doblò; Opel/Vauxhall Combo; Peugeot Rifter/Partner; Citroën SpaceTourer/Jumpy/Dispatch; Fiat Ulysse/Scudo; Opel/Vauxhall Zafira Life/Vivaro; Peugeot Traveller/Expert; Toyota ProAce (Verso)	8

=== North America ===
Country	Name	Location	Date opened	Current products	VIN code
Canada	Brampton Assembly	Brampton	1986	Currently vacant	H
Canada	Etobicoke Casting	Toronto	1942	Aluminum die castings; Engine and transmission parts	–
Canada	Windsor Assembly	Windsor	1928	Chrysler Pacifica; Dodge Charger	R
Mexico	Saltillo Engine	Saltillo	1981	Chrysler Hemi engine; Stellantis Hurricane engine	–
Mexico	Saltillo South Engine	Saltillo	2010	Chrysler Pentastar engine	–
Mexico	Saltillo Stamping	Saltillo	1997	Metal stampings	–
Mexico	Saltillo Truck Assembly	Saltillo	1995	Ram Heavy Duty	G
Mexico	Saltillo Van Assembly	Saltillo	2013	Ram ProMaster	E
Mexico	Toluca Assembly	Toluca	1968	Jeep Compass; Jeep Cherokee (KM); Jeep Wagoneer S; Jeep Recon	T
Mexico	Toluca Stamping Facility	Toluca	1968	Metal stampings	–
United States	Detroit Assembly Complex – Jefferson	Detroit, Michigan	1991	Dodge Durango; Jeep Grand Cherokee	C
United States	Detroit Assembly Complex – Mack	Detroit, Michigan	1953	Jeep Grand Cherokee	8
United States	Dundee Engine Plant	Dundee, Michigan	2002	Chrysler Pentastar engine	–
United States	Indiana Transmission	Kokomo, Indiana	1998	6- and 9-speed automatic transmissions	–
United States	Kokomo Engine Plant	Kokomo, Indiana	2003	FCA Global Medium Engine	–
United States	Kokomo Casting	Kokomo, Indiana	1965	Engine blocks; Transmission cases; Aluminum components	–
United States	Kokomo Transmission	Kokomo, Indiana	1956	8-speed automatic transmissions; Machined components for 9-speed automatic transmission	–
United States	Mount Elliott Tool and Die	Detroit, Michigan	1938	Tools and dies; Checking fixtures; Stamping fixtures	–
United States	Sterling Heights Assembly	Sterling Heights, Michigan	1953	Ram 1500	N
United States	Sterling Stamping	Sterling Heights, Michigan	1965	Metal stampings	–
United States	Tipton Transmission	Tipton, Indiana	2014	9-speed automatic transmissions	–
United States	Toledo Machining	Perrysburg, Ohio	1967	Steering columns; Torque converters	–
United States	Toledo North	Toledo, Ohio	2001	Jeep Wrangler	W
United States	Toledo South	Toledo, Ohio	1942	Jeep Gladiator	L
United States	Trenton Engine Complex	Trenton, Michigan	1952	Chrysler Pentastar engine	–
United States	Warren Stamping	Warren, Michigan	1949	Metal stampings	–
United States	Warren Truck Assembly	Warren, Michigan	1938	Jeep Wagoneer/Grand Wagoneer	S, T, V

=== South America ===
Country	Name	Location	Date opened	Current products
Argentina	El Palomar Plant	El Palomar	1960	Peugeot 208; Peugeot 2008
Argentina	Ferreyra Plant	Ferreyra	1958	Fiat Cronos; Peugeot Landtrek; Fiat Titano
Brazil	Betim Plant	Betim	1976	Fiat Argo; Fiat Pulse; Fiat Fastback; Fiat Fiorino (327); Fiat Mobi; Fiat Strada II; Ram 700
Brazil	Goiana Plant	Goiana	2015	Fiat Toro/Ram 1000; Jeep Commander; Jeep Compass; Jeep Renegade; Ram Rampage
Brazil	Porto Real Plant	Porto Real	2001	Citroën C3; Citroën C3 Aircross; Citroën Basalt

=== Oceania ===
Country	Name	Location	Date opened	Current products	Notes
Australia	Clayton South Plant	Clayton South	2015	Ram 2500 (conversion); Ram 3500 (conversion)	Owned and operated by Walkinshaw Group; Remanufacturer of right-hand drive vehicles from left-hand drive vehicles
Australia	Distribution	Port Melbourne	2021	Jeep; Alfa Romeo; Fiat Passenger; Fiat Professional; Leapmotor	Owned and operated by Stellantis; Parent Company

== Future assembly plants ==
Country	Name	Location	Projected opening date	Products	Notes
South Africa	Coega Plant	Coega	2026/2027	Peugeot Landtrek	New factory to be opened near Gqeberha (Port Elizabeth) as a replacement of the previous Walvis Bay, Namibia, SKD facility
United States	Belvidere Assembly	Belvidere, Illinois	2027	Jeep Compass; Jeep Cherokee	Idled in 2023, will return to production in 2027

== Former assembly plants ==
Country	Name	Location	Date opened	Date closed	Products
Russia	Kaluga Plant	Kaluga	2013	2022	Citroën Jumpy; Opel/Vauxhall Vivaro; Peugeot Expert; Mitsubishi Pajero Sport
Austria	Aspern Plant	Aspern	1982	2024	Six-speed manual transmissions
Italy	Grugliasco Plant	Grugliasco	2013	2024	Maserati Ghibli; Maserati Quattroporte
Poland	Bielsko-Biała Plant	Bielsko-Biała	1948	2024	Engines; Gearboxes
Namibia	Walvis Bay Plant	Walvis Bay	2018	2023	Opel Grandland; Peugeot 3008
United Kingdom	Luton Plant	Luton	1905	2025	Citroën SpaceTourer/Jumpy/Dispatch; Fiat Ulysse/Scudo; Opel/Vauxhall Zafira Life/Vivaro; Peugeot Traveller/Expert; Toyota ProAce (Verso)

== Motorsport ==
Stellantis Motorsport is a department led by director and senior vice president Jean-Marc Finot. It is responsible for the motorsport activities of the corporation's brands, divisions, and subsidiaries:

- Citroën Racing
  - Commercial operation focusing on customer racing with the Citroën C3 Rally2, although known to be supporting entries in WRC2
  - Entrant in FIA Formula E World Championship
- DS Performance
  - Entrant in FIA Formula E World Championship
- Opel Motorsport
  - Manufacturer of the electric rally car Opel Corsa-e Rally and organiser of its Opel e-Rally Cup
  - Commercial operation focusing on customer racing with the Opel Corsa Rally4
- Peugeot Sport
  - Entrant of the FIA World Endurance Championship
  - Commercial operation focusing on customer racing with the Peugeot 208 Rally4
- Lancia Corse HF
  - Entrant of the FIA World Rally Championship
  - Commercial operation focusing on customer racing with the Lancia Ypsilon Rally4 HF

The Stellantis Motorsport Racing Shop combines Citroën Racing, Peugeot Sport and Opel Motorsports' customer racing distribution and retail sales operations. It is also known as Peugeot Citroën Racing Shop and Peugeot Citroën Opel Racing Shop.

The Stellantis Motorsport Cup is a rally competition run in Belgium, France and Spain using Peugeot 208 and Opel Corsa Rally4 cars. The cup originated in Belgium and Luxembourg as PSA Motorsport Cup Belux.

== Technology ==
=== Electrification strategy ===
In 2021, Stellantis released its "Dare Forward" strategic plan, which aims to invest €50 billion before 2030 to fund electrification of vehicles and sets global sales and sustainability targets. Goals include achieving 100% battery electric vehicle (BEV) sales for passenger cars in Europe and 50% of passenger car and light-duty truck sales in the United States by 2030, across 75 electric vehicle models. Stellantis is using a mix of nickel-based (NMC) and cobalt-free battery packs, and lithium iron phosphate (LFP) packs for cheaper BEV variants, to power vehicles with front-, rear-, and all-wheel-drive systems, for driving ranges between 500 and 800 kilometers (300–500 miles).

== Sustainability ==
In 2023, Stellantis introduced SUSTAINera, a hub for recycling and sourcing used parts to improve circular economy sustainability goals, reduce waste, and offset emissions. The initiative aims to contribute to the goal of achieving carbon net zero by 2038. Stellantis hopes to also further these goals by integrating its B-Parts aftermarket platform, acquired by PSA in 2020.

On 12 December 2024, it was reported that Stellantis have agreed to establish a joint-venture with CATL to invest €4.1 billion in building a large-scale lithium iron phosphate battery plant in Zaragoza, Spain. This is in line with its 2038 zero carbon target.

== See also ==
- List of Stellantis platforms
- List of automotive manufacturers by production
