= Conner Avenue Assembly =

Building in Michigan, United States

- Operated: 1966–2017
- Location: Detroit, Michigan, United States
- Coordinates: 42.44°N 83.02°W
- Industry: Automotive
- Owners: Champion (1966–1989); Cooper Industries (1989–1990); Chrysler (1995–2014); Fiat Chrysler Automobiles (2014–2021); Stellantis North America (2021–present)

Conner Center, previously known as Conner Avenue Assembly, is a Stellantis North America facility in Detroit, Michigan. The facility opened in 1966 as a factory for spark plug company Champion. It was closed by Cooper Industries in 1990 shortly after their acquisition of Champion. In 1995, Chrysler purchased the facility to be a low-volume specialty assembly plant.

Dodge Viper production moved from New Mack Assembly to Conner in October 1995 and Plymouth Prowler production started in May 1997. The Viper's V10 engine was originally built at Mound Road Engine but moved to Conner Avenue in May 2001. The facility had been out of use since 2010, when Viper production temporarily ceased, however the plant resumed operations in late 2012 to build the Viper again.

On July 12, 2017, Fiat Chrysler Automobiles (FCA) announced that due to the Viper's discontinuation, the plant would be shut down permanently on August 31. The factory's 86 workers were offered employment at other FCA sites.

However, in 2018 FCA announced that the plant will be renamed the "Conner Center" and will serve as "an internal meeting and display space that will showcase the Company’s concept and historic vehicle collection," some of which was formerly hosted at the closed Walter P. Chrysler Museum.

== Vehicles produced ==
- Dodge Viper (1995–2010, 2012–2017)
- Plymouth Prowler (1997, 1999–2000), Chrysler Prowler (2001–2002)
- V10 engine (1995–2003)
