= FCA Global Medium Engine =

Alfa Romeo
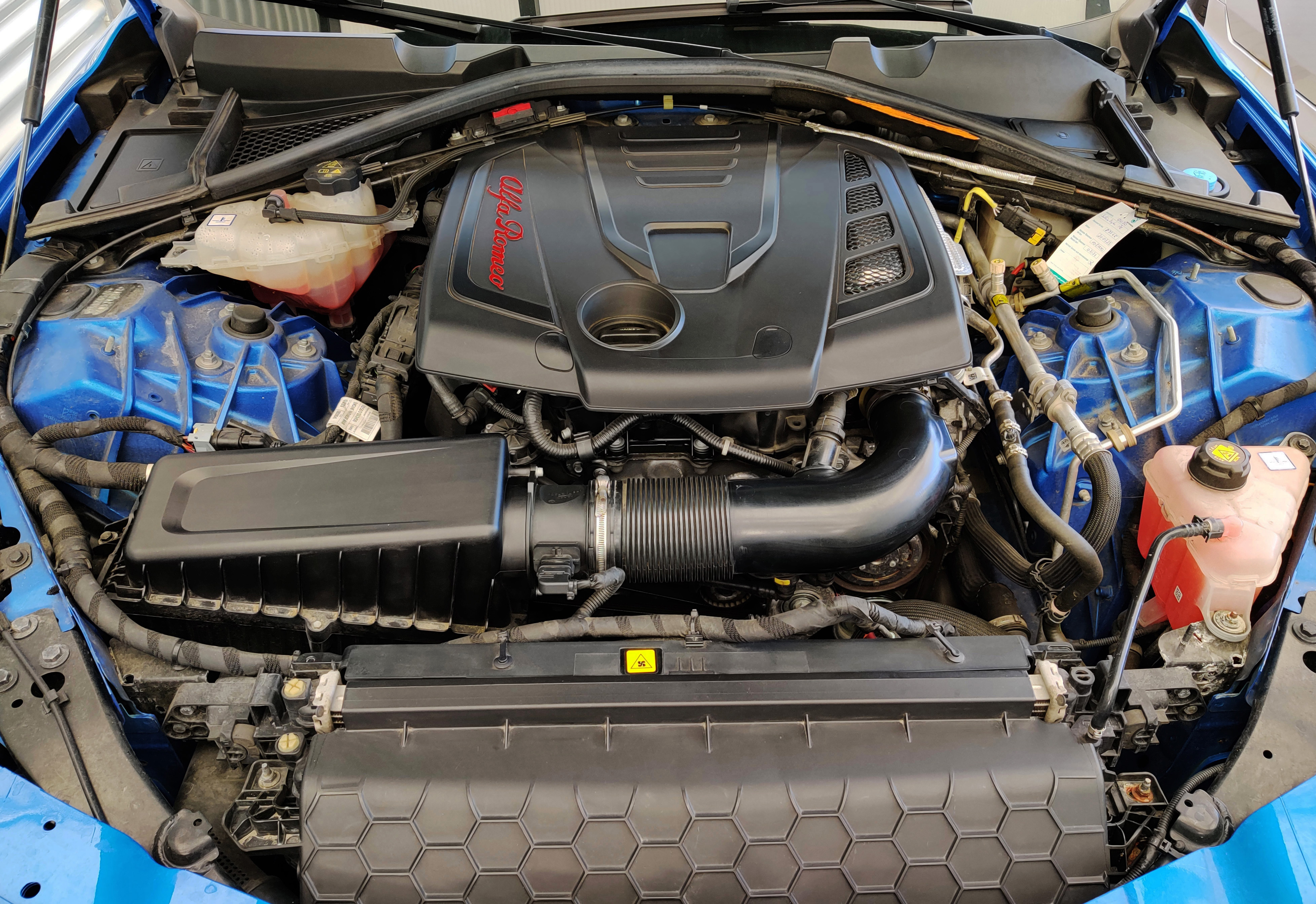

Overview
- Manufacturer: Alfa Romeo
- Also called: Hurricane 4 EVO (FCA US in 2026)
- Production: 2016-present

Layout
- Configuration: Straight-four
- Displacement: 1,995 cc (121.7 cu in)
- Cylinder bore: 84 mm (3.3 in)
- Piston stroke: 90 mm (3.5 in)
- Cylinder block material: Aluminum
- Cylinder head material: Aluminum
- Valvetrain: DOHC w/ dual VVT
- Compression ratio: 10:1 & 12:1

Combustion
- Turbocharger: Single dual-scroll
- Fuel system: Direct injection, ≤20 MPa / Dual Injection (Direct & Port Injection)
- Fuel type: Gasoline
- Oil system: Wet sump
- Cooling system: Water-cooled

Emissions
- Emissions target standard: Federal Tier III

Chronology
- Predecessor: Alfa Romeo 1750 TBI engine Alfa Romeo JTS engine World Gasoline Engine (Chrysler); Chrysler Pentastar engine (Hurricane 4 EVO)

The Global Medium Engine (GME for short) is a family of engines created by a joint venture between the powertrain divisions of Alfa Romeo, Chrysler, Dodge, and Jeep of Fiat Chrysler Automobiles. It has been in production since 2016.

The GME family is composed by two new series of engine: one created by Alfa Romeo (code project Giorgio) for Alfa Romeo Giulia and Stelvio, and the second (code project Hurricane4) by FCA US for American vehicles made by Chrysler, Dodge, and Jeep. Both are produced in Termoli, Italy at the Termoli Powertrain Plant.

The first vehicle to use the GME T4 engine is the 2016 Alfa Romeo Giulia introduced in April 2016, followed by the Alfa Romeo Stelvio. The first American Hurricane was adopted by the new Jeep Wrangler (JL) in 2018 followed by the facelift 2019 Jeep Cherokee (KL) and the Chinese Jeep Grand Commander. It is currently available only in 2.0L capacities, with different tunings.

The 2.0L GME-T4 received an update in 2025 dubbed Hurricane 4 EVO and is expected to debut in the 2026 Jeep Grand Cherokee WL mid-cycle refresh. This variant of the engine uses the Miller combustion cycle and will ultimately replace the Pentastar V6 engine as the main corporate engine for Stellantis North America in compact and mid-size applications.

== Production ==
Around 2018, it was rumored production of the Hurricane would move to the Trenton Engine Plant in Trenton, Michigan which also builds the World Gasoline Engine and the Chrysler Pentastar engine. However, FCA announced on March 5, 2020, it will invest $400 million to repurpose the idled Indiana Transmission Plant II in Kokomo, Indiana, to build the GME for the United States market. Production of the USA-built Hurricane began in 2022. By June 2018, the GME T4 will also be built in Changsha (China) by GAC Fiat Chrysler Powertrain plant for Chinese made vehicles.

=== Production Plants ===
- Termoli Powertrain Plant in Termoli, Italy (since 2016 for European and United States markets)
- GAC Fiat Chrysler in Changsha, China (2018-2022 for Chinese markets)
- Kokomo Engine Plant (formerly Indiana Transmission Plant II) in Kokomo, Indiana (since 2022 for United States markets)
- Dundee Engine Plant in Dundee, Michigan (since 2025 for United States markets)(GME-T4 EVO)

== Applications ==
=== GME T4 ===
- 2016- Alfa Romeo Giulia (952)
- 2017- Alfa Romeo Stelvio
- 2018- Jeep Wrangler (JL)
- 2018-2023 Jeep Cherokee (KL)
- 2018-2022 Jeep Grand Commander
- 2021-2023 Maserati Ghibli Hybrid
- 2021-2024 Maserati Levante Hybrid
- 2021-2025 Jeep Wrangler 4xe
- 2021-2025 Jeep Grand Cherokee (WL) (Export)
- 2022-2025 Jeep Grand Cherokee 4xe (WL)
- 2022- Maserati Grecale
- 2023-2025 Dodge Hornet
- 2023- Ram Rampage
- 2023- Jeep Compass
- 2024- Alfa Romeo Tonale
- 2025- Jeep Commander

=== Hurricane 4 EVO (GME-T4 EVO) ===
- 2026- Jeep Grand Cherokee (WL)
- 2028- Jeep Wrangler (JL)
- 2028- Ram Dakota (US)
- 2028- Chrysler Airflow (2027) (production)
- 2028- Dodge GLH
- 2028- Jeep Compass III (North America)
- 2028- Ram Rampage (North America)

== See also ==
- Stellantis Hurricane GME-T6
