= Fiat Ireland =

Car manufacturer

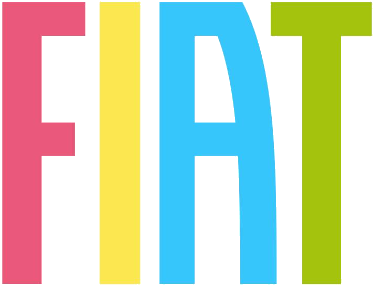
- Formerly: Fiat Chrysler Automobiles Ireland
- Company type: Subsidiary
- Industry: Automotive
- Founded: 30 November 1923; 102 years ago
- Headquarters: Dublin, Ireland
- Products: Automobiles
- Parent: Stellantis
- Website: fiat.ie

Fiat Ireland (formerly, Fiat Chrysler Automobiles Ireland) is the Irish subsidiary of Stellantis. With an assembly plant for motor vehicles, it was part of the automotive industry in Ireland

== History ==
"Fiat Motors (Ireland) Limited" was founded in Dublin on 30 November 1923. It imported and sold Fiat vehicles. From 1948 to 1956, W. J. Henderson assembled Fiat vehicles for the Irish market. In 1966 the decision was made to have its own assembly plant. Assembly began in 1968. Vehicle production ended in 1984.

The company was renamed "Fiat Auto (Ireland) Limited" on 20 January 1925, Fiat Group Automobiles (Ireland) Limited on 21 January 1986, "Fiat Group Automobiles (Ireland) Limited" on 6 July 2007, "Fiat Group Automobiles Ireland Limited" on 17 July after the merger with Chrysler into "Fiat Chrysler Automobiles Ireland Limited" and on 23 March 2015 into Fiat Chrysler Automobiles Ireland Designated Activity Company.

== Vehicles ==
The assembly of Fiat 600, 850, 1100, 124, 127 and 128 has been documented with certainty. There is an indication that basic versions were assembled in the country and variants with special equipment were imported. The 132 was also offered.

== Production figures ==
The following are the registration numbers in Ireland for Fiat vehicles from the years Fiat Ireland assembled them. The registration numbers are not identical to the production numbers. Nonetheless, around 10,000 assembled vehicles a year have survived from 1973 to 1981.

Year	Units sold
1968	5,059
1969	5,345
1970	4,916
1971	5,672
1972	8,472
1973	9,770
1974	10,520
1975	10,236
1976	12,395
1977	12,715
1978	12,219
1979	10,130
1980	7,905
1981	9,813
1982	6,508
1983	5,190
1984	4,293
Total	141,158
