= Mound Road Engine =

- Operated: 1955–2002
- Location: 20300 Mound Road; Detroit
- Coordinates: 42.4438°N 83.0427°W
- Industry: Automotive
- Products: Engines
- Area: 539,059 sq ft (50,080 m^{2}) (1955)
- Owners: Briggs Manufacturing Co. (1909?–1953); Chrysler (1953–2002)
- Defunct: 2002; 24 years ago

Mound Road Engine was a Chrysler automobile engine factory in Detroit. Chrysler acquired the plant as part of its purchase of the Briggs Manufacturing Company in 1953. The plant was closed by DaimlerChrysler in 2002, with production shifting to the Mack Avenue Engine Complex.

Chrysler briefly used the facility for making aircraft components, and transferred it to the Plymouth division in 1954. Plymouth added 71,000 square feet (6,600 m^{2}) to the existing plant, bringing its size to just over 539,000 sq ft (50,100 m^{2}). By the time engine production began in 1955, it housed what was at the time the world's longest assembly line.

The factory was home to Chrysler's production of the small-block Chrysler A engine, a V8 used in Plymouth vehicles, then later the LA V8, or "Light A", as it weighed nearly 50 pounds less than the "A" engine it was closely based on. Later, the plant built the LA-based Magnum V10 engine. The factory was in operation for 47 years.

The facility was torn down in late 2003 and the land paved over because it was cheaper to pay taxes on a parking lot than an empty building. The newly paved area, as well as the old employee parking lots, are now used to store vehicles that were manufactured at Warren Truck Assembly before shipping them to dealerships.

Mount Elliott Tool and Die, another Chrysler facility, is located directly behind what used to be the Mound Road Engine plant. The facility was located at 20300 Mound Road, Detroit, Michigan.
