= Warren Stamping Plant =

Chrysler automotive factory

- Built: 1948
- Operated: 1949–present
- Location: Warren, Michigan, United States
- Coordinates: 42.45808°N 83.04111°W
- Industry: Automotive
- Products: Auto parts
- Employees: 1,486 (2022)
- Area: 78 acres (0.32 km^{2})
- Address: 22800 Mound Road
- Owners: Chrysler (1948–1998); DaimlerChrysler (1998–2007); Chrysler (2007–2014); Fiat Chrysler Automobiles (2014–2021); Stellantis (2021–present)

The Warren Stamping Plant is a Stellantis North America automotive factory in Warren, Michigan that produces auto parts for Chrysler vehicles.

== History ==
The factory was completed in 1948 and began production in 1949. The facility was built in 1948 and started production in 1949. Further expansions of the plant came in 1952, 1964, 1965 and 1986.

Other nearby Chrysler facilities include Warren Truck Assembly and Detroit Assembly Complex – Mack. The nearby Sherwood Assembly closed in the late 1970s when Chrysler halted production of the Dodge Medium and Heavy Duty trucks and exited the market. Sherwood Assembly was then torn down.

== Products ==
The factory manufactures stampings and assemblies including hoods, roofs, liftgates, side apertures, fenders and floor pans included in Chrysler vehicles such as the Dodge Caravan, Chrysler Town & Country, Jeep Grand Cherokee and Ram Trucks.
