= Dundee Engine Plant =

Organization

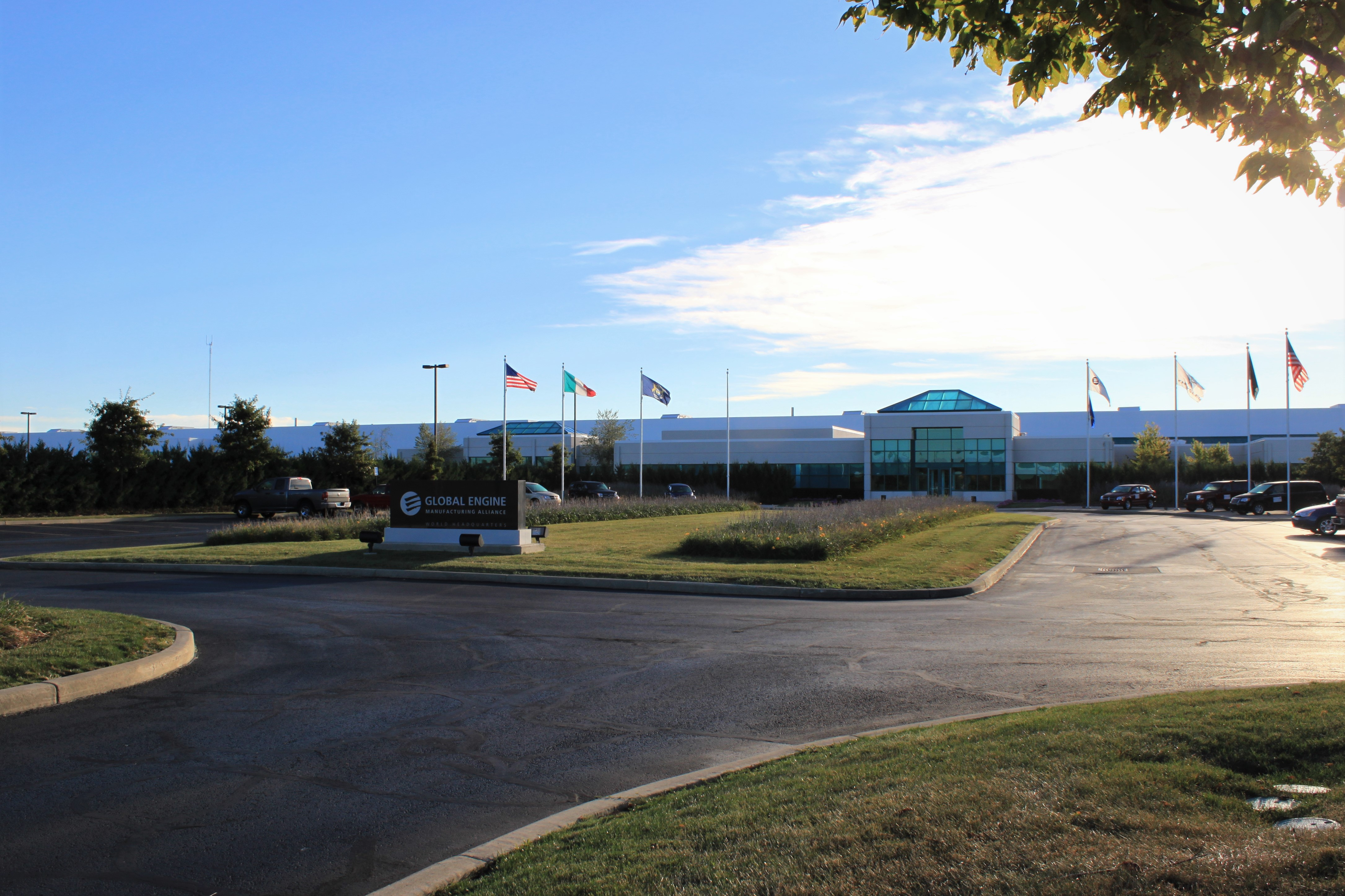
- Built: 2004
- Operated: October 2005–present
- Location: 5800 North Ann Arbor Road; Dundee, Michigan
- Coordinates: 41.9798°N 83.66267°W
- Industry: Automotive
- Products: Engines
- Employees: 987
- Area: 275 acres (1.11 km^{2})
- Volume: 1,300,000 sq ft (120,000 m^{2})
- Owners: DaimlerChrysler (2004–2007); Chrysler (2007–2014); Fiat Chrysler Automobiles (2014–2021); Stellantis (2021–present)

Dundee Engine Plant is an automobile engine factory in Dundee, Michigan. It is now wholly owned by Stellantis North America; it was formerly part of the Global Engine Manufacturing Alliance (GEMA).

The plant has over 1,300,000 sq ft (120,000 m^{2}) of floor space and 275 acres (111 ha) of land, 100 (40) of which are covered in Michigan prairie. The plant currently employs about 714 workers.

== History ==
The plant was constructed as part of the Global Engine Alliance joint venture between DaimlerChrysler, Hyundai Motor Company, and Mitsubishi Motors and cost $803 million. Construction of the plant began in April 2003 and was complete in 2004. The North Plant opened in October 2005, and the South Plant opened in November 2006. Chrysler launched production of the 1.4 L FIRE engine at the plant in November 2010, after a $179 million investment. An additional $150 million investment was also announced in October 2010 to be used for capacity expansion and future engine production.

In January 2012, the name was officially changed from Global Engine Manufacturing Alliance to its current name. Also in 2012, Dundee started producing the 2.0 L Tigershark engine. On August 6, 2012, a second shift was added to FIRE engine production.

In August 2013, Chrysler planned to invest in Dundee Engine and the Trenton Engine Plant with $52 million in improvements. $40.5 million was to go to Dundee to help aid Trenton with Tigershark engine production.

== Former Products ==
- 1.4 FIRE I4 engine
- 1.8 World I4 engine
- 2.0 World I4 engine
- 2.4 World I4 engine
- 2.0 Tigershark I4 engine
- 2.4 Tigershark I4 engine

== Current Products ==
- 3.6 Pentastar V6 engine
- 1.6T Prince engine 4-cylinder turbo

== Future Products ==
- 2.0 Hurricane4 EVO twin turbo I4
