= Detroit Assembly Complex – Jefferson =

Stellantis automobile assembly plant in Detroit

- Built: 1991
- Operated: January 1992–present
- Location: 2101 Conner Street, Detroit, Michigan, United States
- Coordinates: 42.3718°N 82.967°W
- Industry: Automotive
- Products: SUVs
- Employees: 5,096 (2022)
- Area: 283 acres (1.15 km^{2})
- Volume: 3,000,000 sq ft (280,000 m^{2})
- Owners: Chrysler (1991–1998); DaimlerChrysler (1998–2007); Chrysler (2007–2014); Fiat Chrysler Automobiles (2014–2021); Stellantis (2021–present)

Detroit Assembly Complex – Jefferson, previously known as the Jefferson North Assembly Plant (JNAP), is a Stellantis North America automobile assembly factory in Detroit, Michigan. The plant is located adjacent to the Detroit Assembly Complex – Mack plant. Located on East Jefferson Avenue 6 miles (9.7 km) northeast of Downtown Detroit, near Grosse Pointe Park, the factory opened in 1991 as a major commitment to the city of Detroit by Chrysler, and was expanded in 1999, bringing its area to 2,700,000 sq ft (250,000 m^{2}) and expanded again in 2011, bringing its total to 3,000,000 sq ft (280,000 m^{2}).

Its first product was the Jeep Grand Cherokee from the start, which it continues to produce to this day. It uses the original site of the former multi-story Chrysler Kercheval Body Plant, a noted Detroit landmark for a series of large advertising signs on the roof, plus the Hudson Motor Company location that was originally built during the 1940s as a storage lot for newly manufactured vehicles to the east of the facility. The Kercheval Plant was imploded, and video of the demolition was used in a Chrysler Corp. commercial with Lee Iacocca using the new plant as evidence of the company's investment in new product.

== History ==
The Detroit Assembly Complex and its two plants are the only remaining auto assembly plants entirely within the Detroit city limits. Detroit/Hamtramck Assembly owned by General Motors, is partly in Detroit and partly in the neighboring city of Hamtramck.

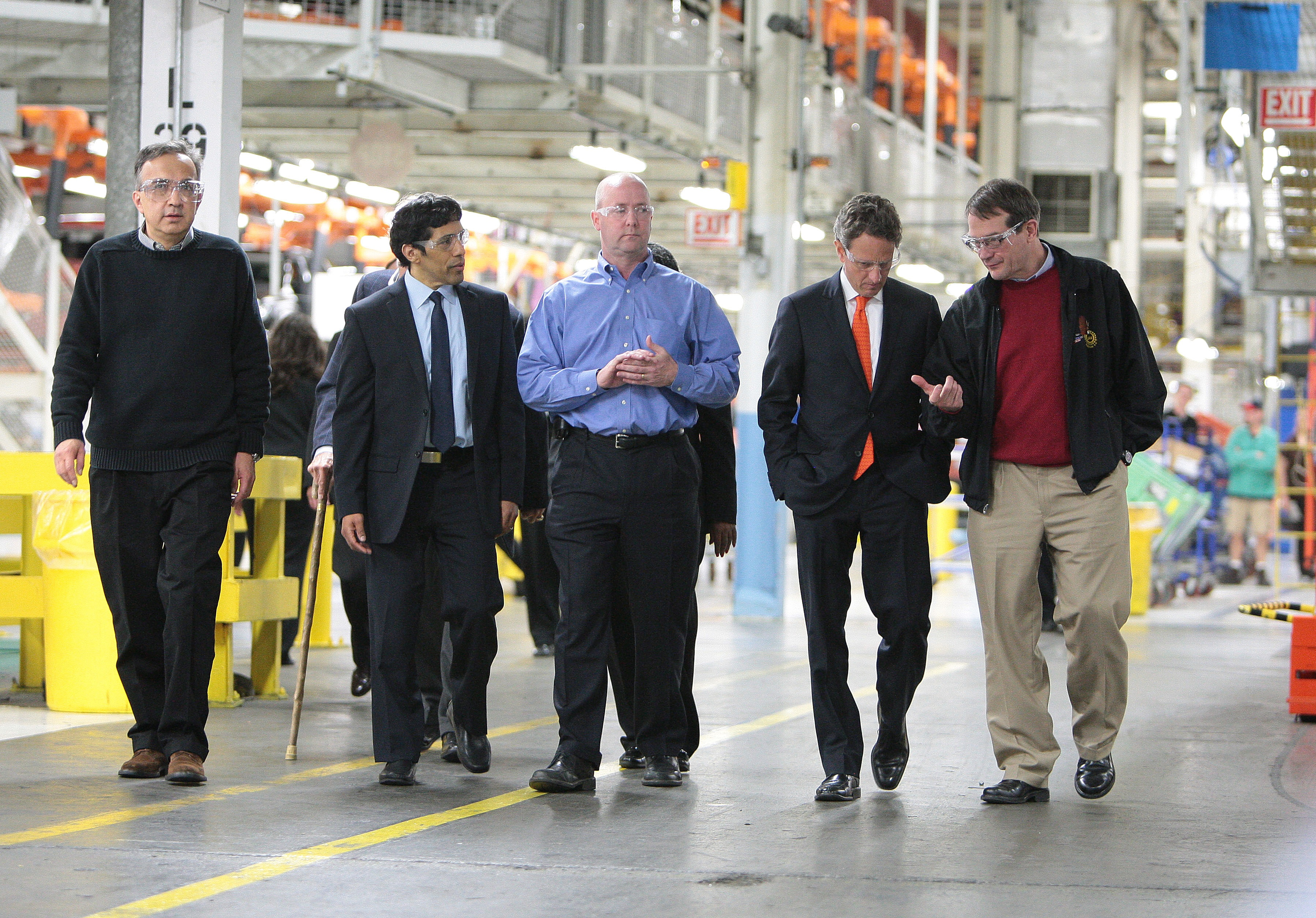
FCA CEO Sergio Marchionne, Rep. Hansen Clarke, Plant Manager Pat Walsh, Treasury Secretary Tim Geithner, and UAW President Bob King on a tour of the plant in April 2011

Chrysler announced in August 2008 a 1.8-billion-dollar investment in the plant that would expand it by 285,000 sq ft (26,500 m^{2}) and upgrade the facility for the production of a new product in 2010. Improvements in the plant occurred during a period of intense corporate turmoil for the parent company. Daimler-Benz had sold its majority stake to Cerberus Capital Management in 2007. Cerberus and the United Auto Workers agreed in 2007 to a plan whereby entry workers are paid $16/hour compared to $28 for long-term UAW employees. The Cerberus-owned company went into bankruptcy in 2009 with the company getting a multibillion-dollar bailout by the United States government before ultimately being acquired by Fiat in 2011.

In 2013, more than 300,000 cars a year were being produced at the plant and its work force was reported at 4,600 working, with the plant in operation 24 hours a day. The crews work an "alternative work schedule" (AWS) known as 3-2-120 that does not require Chrysler to pay overtime or weekend pay. The schedule was part of the bailout package.

Each crew works 10 hours a day for 4 days. "A" from 5 a.m. to 3:30 p.m. Monday through Thursday. "B" from 4 p.m. to 2:30 a.m. on Wednesday through Saturday. "C" from 10 hours on the night shift Monday and Tuesday and 10 hours on the day shift Friday and Saturday. The 3/2/120 comes from a practice of working for three days, taking off two, plus Sunday for everyone, so that everyone works 120 hours over every three weeks.

In August 2013, the Jefferson North Assembly Plant produced its 5,000,000th vehicle since it first made the 1993 Jeep Grand Cherokee ZJ in 1992. The vehicle was a 2014 Jeep Grand Cherokee WK2 Overland. A decal was placed on the windshield of the vehicle to signify that it was the 5,000,000th vehicle produced at the Jefferson North Assembly Plant. The vehicle was donated to the USO, whom Jeep and Chrysler Group support. A 1993 Jeep Grand Cherokee Laredo 4X4 is also on display at JNAP to celebrate this milestone.

President Barack Obama visited the plant in 2010 to speak to the workers at the plant. He said that the first new vehicle he ever owned was a 2000 Jeep Grand Cherokee Limited.

In May 2015, Fiat Chrysler announced that an employee had been killed at Jefferson North's wastewater treatment plant.

== Products ==
=== Current models ===
- Jeep Grand Cherokee (1993–present)
- Dodge Durango (2011–present)

=== Discontinued models ===
- Jeep Commander (2006–2010)

== Jefferson Avenue Assembly ==
Prior to the opening of Jefferson North Assembly in 1991, Chrysler operated the adjacent Jefferson Avenue Assembly plant from 1925 to 1990 at Jefferson Avenue and Clairpointe Avenue, between the streets of East Jefferson Avenue and Freud Street. The factory was built in 1907 to produce Chalmers automobiles, and later Maxwell automobiles.

In 1925, the newly formed Chrysler Corporation took over the plant to build the Chrysler Six and later its flagship Imperial. In addition to Imperials, various other models from Chrysler, DeSoto, Dodge, and Plymouth were eventually assembled here.

The plant closed in February 1990 and was razed a year later. The Chrysler Kercheval Body Plant stood on the north side of East Jefferson, and was connected to Jefferson Assembly by a bridge crossing Jefferson in the 1950s. The Jefferson Avenue Assembly was approximately three miles east of the Dodge Main factory in nearby Hamtramck, the Packard Automotive Plant which was across the street from the Dodge Factory, and the Plymouth Lynch Road Assembly in Detroit.

== See also ==
- List of Chrysler factories
