= Saltillo Engine Plant =

Chrysler engine plant in Coahuila, Mexico

Saltillo Engine is a Chrysler engine plant in Ramos Arizpe, Coahuila, Mexico. The factory opened in 1981. It was built as a scale model of the plant at Trenton, Michigan, United States, but with more work flexibility, having only 20 job classifications rather than the 70 at Trenton.

Current products:

- Chrysler 5.7 Hemi V8
- 6.4 L Hemi Apache V8
- 3.0 L Hurricane I6

Former products:

- Chrysler 5.9LA (1981-1992)
- Chrysler 5.9 Magnum V8 (1992-2003)
- Chrysler 8.0 Magnum V10 Truck (1994-2003)
- Chrysler 6.2 Hellcat V8 (2015-2024)
- Chrysler 6.4 SRT V8 (2011-2024)
- 2.0 L I4
- 2.4 L I4
- 2.4 L Tigershark I4

== South Engine Plant ==
Saltillo South Engine opened in 2010. It produces the 3.6 L Pentastar V6 engine.
