= Detroit Axle =

Former Chrysler automobile factory in Detroit, Michigan

Coordinates: 42°24′16″N 83°01′50″W

Chrysler Detroit Axle Plant (AKA Eldon Axle) was a Chrysler automobile factory in Detroit, Michigan. The factory opened in 1917 and was purchased by Chrysler in 1928. It was expanded in 1956, 1964, 1966, 1969, 1998, 2000, and 2001. The factory closed in 2010. The plant has since been demolished. The property is now used to store new vehicles waiting to be shipped to dealerships.

Products:

- Rear drive axles
  - Dodge Dakota
  - Dodge Durango
  - Dodge Ram
  - Jeep Grand Cherokee
  - Jeep Commander
- Front drive axles
  - Dodge Ram
  - Dodge Dakota
  - Dodge Durango
  - Jeep Grand Cherokee
  - Jeep Commander
- Trailing axles
  - Dodge and Chrysler Minivans
- Differentials
  - Chrysler 300
  - Dodge Magnum
  - Dodge Charger
