= Citroën Chile =

Chilean subsidiary of Citroën

Citroën Chile S.A.C.
- Type: Subsidiary
- Industry: Automotive
- Founded: 1955
- Headquarters: Providencia, Chile
- Area served: Chile
- Key people: Rodrigo Hernando (General Manager)
- Products: Automobiles, panel vans
- Parent: Citroën
- Website: www.citroen.cl

Citroën Chile S.A.C., previously known as Citroën Chilena S.A, is the Chilean subsidiary of French automotive manufacturer Citroën which specializes in the sales and distribution of Citroën automobiles in Chile. Until 1982, it also produced vehicles of the brand in the country.

== History ==
Citroën Chilena S.A. was founded in 1955. In 1963, production of automobiles began at a plant in Arica. A source gives a connection to Sociedad Importadora e Industrial J. Lhorente y Cia. Ltda. in Chinthorre. For a time, José Lhorente managed the company. Likewise, the company name was called Automotriz Arica S.A.

In the early 1970s, the Chilean government under Salvador Allende decided to restructure the automotive industry under state control. To do this, the Joinz Venture Corfo-Citroën was approved to produce small vehicles. Renault and Fiat were to produce medium-sized cars, while Peugeot was to be responsible for large vehicles.

In 1972, the company was renamed Corfo-Citroën. In 1980, the company name was changed to Citroën Chile S.A.C. Production ended in 1982. In the same year, the company had a share of around 4.5% in Chilean vehicle production (457 out of 10,255 vehicles). Citroën Chile is still active as an import company.
