= Kokomo Transmission =

Chrysler automotive factory in Indiana, US

Kokomo Transmission Plant
- Operated: 1956–present
- Location: 2401 South Reed Road; Kokomo, Indiana, United States
- Industry: Automotive
- Products: Automobiles
- Employees: 2,941 (2022)
- Area: 110 acres (0.45 km^{2})
- Volume: 3,100,000 sq ft (290,000 m^{2})
- Owners: Chrysler (1956–1998); DaimlerChrysler (1998–2007); Chrysler (2007–2014); Fiat Chrysler Automobiles (2014–2021); Stellantis (2021–present)

Kokomo Transmission Plant is a Chrysler automotive factory in Kokomo, Indiana that manufactures propulsion transmissions. The 3,100,000 sq ft (290,000 m^{2}) factory opened in 1956 at 2401 South Reed Road.

== Products ==
=== Current ===
- Engine block castings and transmission components (aluminum and steel):
- Chrysler 40TES/41TES transmission FWD
- Chrysler 62TE transmission FWD
- Chrysler 845RE transmission RWD
- Chrysler 850RE transmission RWD
- Engine block castings and transmission components (aluminum and steel)
- Transmissions for Grand Cherokee, Chrysler 300, Dodge Charger, Dodge Challenger, Dodge Durango, Ram 1500

=== Former ===
- Chrysler 404/604/606, 42RLE & 62TE transmissions
- Chrysler 518/618, 46, 47 & 48 RH-RE transmissions
- Chrysler 48RE transmission RWD
- Chrysler 41TE transmission FWD
- Chrysler 40TE transmission FWD
- Chrysler 42RLE transmission RWD
