= Kokomo Casting =

Kokomo Transmission Plant
- Operated: 1965–present
- Location: 1001 East Boulevard; Kokomo, Indiana, United States
- Coordinates: 40.46230246°N 86.11577495°W
- Industry: Automotive
- Products: Transaxle cases, engine blocks, propulsion transmissions
- Employees: 1,213 (2022)
- Area: 35 acres (0.14 km^{2})
- Volume: 625,000 sq ft (58,100 m^{2})
- Owners: Chrysler (1965–1998); DaimlerChrysler (1998–2007); Chrysler (2007–2014); Fiat Chrysler Automobiles (2014–2021); Stellantis (2021–present)

Kokomo Casting Plant is a Stellantis North America automotive factory in Kokomo, Indiana that manufactures aluminum parts for automotive components, transaxle cases, engine blocks, propulsion transmissions. The factory opened in 1965 and was expanded in 1969, 1986, 1995, and 1997. It is the largest die casting factory in the world. In June 2010, Chrysler announced a 300 million dollar investment to retool and modernize the Kokomo Casting for production of a future eight-speed automatic.
