= Twinsburg Stamping =

- Operated: 1957–2010
- Location: Twinsburg, Ohio, United States
- Coordinates: 41.31°N 81.47°W
- Industry: Automotive
- Products: Stamping
- Area: 1,500,000 sq ft (140,000 m^{2})
- Address: 2000 East Aurora Road
- Owner: Chrysler
- Defunct: 2010; 16 years ago

Twinsburg Stamping was a Chrysler automotive stamping factory in Twinsburg, Ohio. The factory opened in 1957 and closed on July 31, 2010. It processed, on average, over 26,000 tons of steel a month and shipped stamped panels to assembly plants in Mexico, the United States, Austria, and Canada. The former Chrysler Corporation began modernizing the press room with new Verson "C" Transfer Presses in 1994.

This modernization continued, even after the merger with Germany's Daimler-Benz, through the early 2000s. New equipment included additional Verson Transfer Presses as well as new Schuler and Mueller Weingarten Transfer and Tandem Presses. New Schuler blankers were also added during the early 2000s, and the plant quickly became one of the most modern stamping plants in North America.

By 2006, the plant produced stampings and assemblies for several Chrysler, Dodge, and Jeep vehicles with the help of 228 robots and 1,7600 people.

Through numerous bad decisions from parent company DaimlerChrysler, the company slid into another one of its bust cycles. After the bankruptcy of 2009, the President's Automotive Task Force decided that Twinsburg would close, and the plant was put up for auction. As of 12 August 2012, the only part of the plant still standing is the main cafeteria and administration building.

== Products lines ==
Stampings and assemblies:

- Chrysler Pacifica
- Chrysler Minivans
- Chrysler Neon
- Dodge Caravan
- Dodge Durango
- Dodge Ram
- Dodge Dakota
- Jeep Liberty
