= List of Fiat Group assembly sites =

This list contains all current Stellantis Europe automobile assembly sites. Including joint-ventures, license production and outsourced production.

== Assembly sites ==
Stellantis Europe assembly plants by model
Country	Plant	Owner	Location	Date opened	Current products	VIN
Italy	Stabilimento Mirafiori	Fabbrica Italia Mirafiori S.p.A. (100% Stellantis Europe S.p.A.)	Turin	1939	Fiat 500e Maserati GranTurismo	X
Italy	Cassino	Stellantis Europe S.p.A.	Piedimonte San Germano	1972	Alfa Romeo Giulia; Alfa Romeo Stelvio; Maserati Grecale	7
Italy	SATA	Società Automobilistica Tecnologie Avanzate S.p.A. (100% Stellantis Europe S.p.A.)	Melfi	1993	Jeep Renegade; Fiat 500X; Jeep Compass	P
Italy	Giambattista Vico	Fabbrica Italia Pomigliano S.p.A. (100% Stellantis Europe S.p.A.)	Pomigliano d'Arco, Naples	1968	Fiat Panda; Alfa Romeo Tonale	3
Poland	Tychy	FCA Poland S.A. (100% Stellantis Europe S.p.A.)	Tychy	1992	Jeep Avenger; Fiat 600e Alfa Romeo Junior (2024)	J
Brazil	Betim	FCA Fiat Chrysler Automóveis do Brasil Ltda. (100% Stellantis Europe S.p.A.)	Betim, Minas Gerais	1973	Fiat Mobi; Fiat Argo; Fiat Argo X Fiat Strada Pick Up (RAM 700); Fiat Fiorino/Peugeot Partner Rapid; Fiat Pulse; Fiat Fastback	Y
Brazil	Goiana	FCA Fiat Chrysler Automóveis do Brasil Ltda. (100% Stellantis Europe S.p.A.)	Goiana, Pernambuco	2015	Jeep Renegade; Jeep Compass; Jeep Commander; Fiat Toro; Ram Rampage	K
Argentina	Cordoba	Fiat Auto Argentina s.a. (100% Stellantis Europe S.p.A.)	Cordoba	1995	Fiat Cronos	U
Italy	Atessa (ex Sevel Sud)	Stellantis Europe S.p.A.	Val di Sangro, Atessa	1981	Fiat Ducato/Peugeot Boxer/Citroën Jumper/Opel/Vauxhall Movano	2
Stellantis Europe joint-ventures
Country	Plant	Owner	Location	Date started	Current products	VIN
Turkey	Tofaş	Türk Otomobil Fabrikasi A.Ş; 38-38 JV with the Koç Group	Bursa	1968	Fiat Doblò/Ram ProMaster City; Fiat Fiorino; Fiat Tipo/Egea/Dodge Neon	6
India	FIAPL	Fiat India Automobiles Private Limited; 50-50 JV with Tata Motors Passenger Vehicles	Ranjangaon, Maharashtra	1997	Jeep Compass; Tata Nexon; Tata Altroz; Jeep Wrangler; Jeep Meridian/Commander; Jeep Grand Cherokee; Tata Curvv	F
Serbia	FCAS (formerly Zastava)	Fiat Chrysler Automobiles Serbia; 67-33 JV with Government of Serbia	Kragujevac	2008	Fiat Grande Panda	Z
Other assembly plants
Country	Plant	Owner	Location	Date opened	Current products	VIN
Italy	Maserati	Maserati S.p.A. (100% Stellantis N.V.)	Modena	1940	Maserati MC20	M
Mexico	Saltillo Van	FCA US LLC (100% Stellantis N.V.)	Saltillo	2013	Fiat Ducato/Ram ProMaster	E

== See also ==
- List of Chrysler factories
- List of Ford factories
- List of Mazda facilities
- List of General Motors factories
- List of former automotive manufacturing plants
- List of Volkswagen Group factories
