= Toledo Machining =

Manufacturing plant in Perrysburg, Ohio, US

Toledo Machining Plant
- Built: 1964
- Operated: 1966–present
- Location: Perrysburg, Ohio, United States
- Coordinates: 41.553°N 83.544°W
- Industry: Automotive
- Products: Steering columns, torque converters
- Employees: 1,060
- Area: 169 acres (0.68 km^{2})
- Volume: 1,200,000 sq ft (110,000 m^{2})
- Address: 8000 Chrysler Drive

Chrysler Toledo Machining is a Stellantis North America manufacturing plant in Perrysburg, Ohio. Construction began in 1964 with production starting in 1966. The plant manufactures steering columns and torque converters for several Stellantis factories around the world.

== History ==
Construction started in 1964 and the plant began operations two years later. Subsequent expansions of the factory came in 1969, adding 2,430,000 sq ft (226,000 m^{2}). In August 2011, Chrysler LLC announced that it would invest $72 million to produce steering columns and torque converters for its propulsion transmissions. Chrysler LLC announced in April 2013 a new investment of $19.6 million to increase capacity of its converters.

In August 2018, FCA announced that Toledo Machining would produce a key component for the first plug-in hybrid Jeep Renegade. The factory also produced the power module for the Jeep Wrangler PHEV.
