= Indiana Transmission =

- Operated: 1998–present
- Location: 3660 North U.S. Highway 931; Kokomo, Indiana, United States
- Coordinates: 40.53°N 86.12°W
- Industry: Automotive
- Products: Propulsion transmissions
- Employees: 1,213 (2022)
- Area: 233 acres (0.94 km^{2})
- Volume: 1,200,000 sq ft (110,000 m^{2})
- Owners: DaimlerChrysler (1998–2007); Chrysler (2007–2014); Fiat Chrysler Automobiles (2014–2021); Stellantis (2021–present)

Indiana Transmission is a Stellantis North America automobile factory in Kokomo, Indiana. The first plant, Indiana Transmission I, opened in 1998 and the second, Indiana Transmission II, opened in 2003. In June 2010, Chrysler announced a 300 million dollar investment to retool and modernize the Indiana plant for production of a future eight-speed automatic transmission.

== Current products ==
=== Indiana Transmission I ===
- Chrysler 65RFE transmission RWD
  - Jeep Grand Cherokee
  - Dodge Durango
  - Dodge Ram 1500
- Chrysler 66RFE transmission RWD
  - Dodge Ram 2500-3500 (5.7L V8)
- Chrysler 68RFE transmission RWD
  - Dodge Ram 2500-3500 (6.7L diesel)
- 948TE FWD
  - Jeep Cherokee

=== Indiana Transmission II ===
- Chrysler W5A580 transmission RWD
  - 6 gen. Charger or 2nd gen. Magnum SXT
    - Gearbox: Daimler-Benz 5G-Tronic
  - Chrysler 300
  - Dodge Challenger
  - Dodge Charger (LX)
  - Jeep Grand Cherokee
