= Plymouth Prowler =

Two-seat retro sports car produced by Chrysler

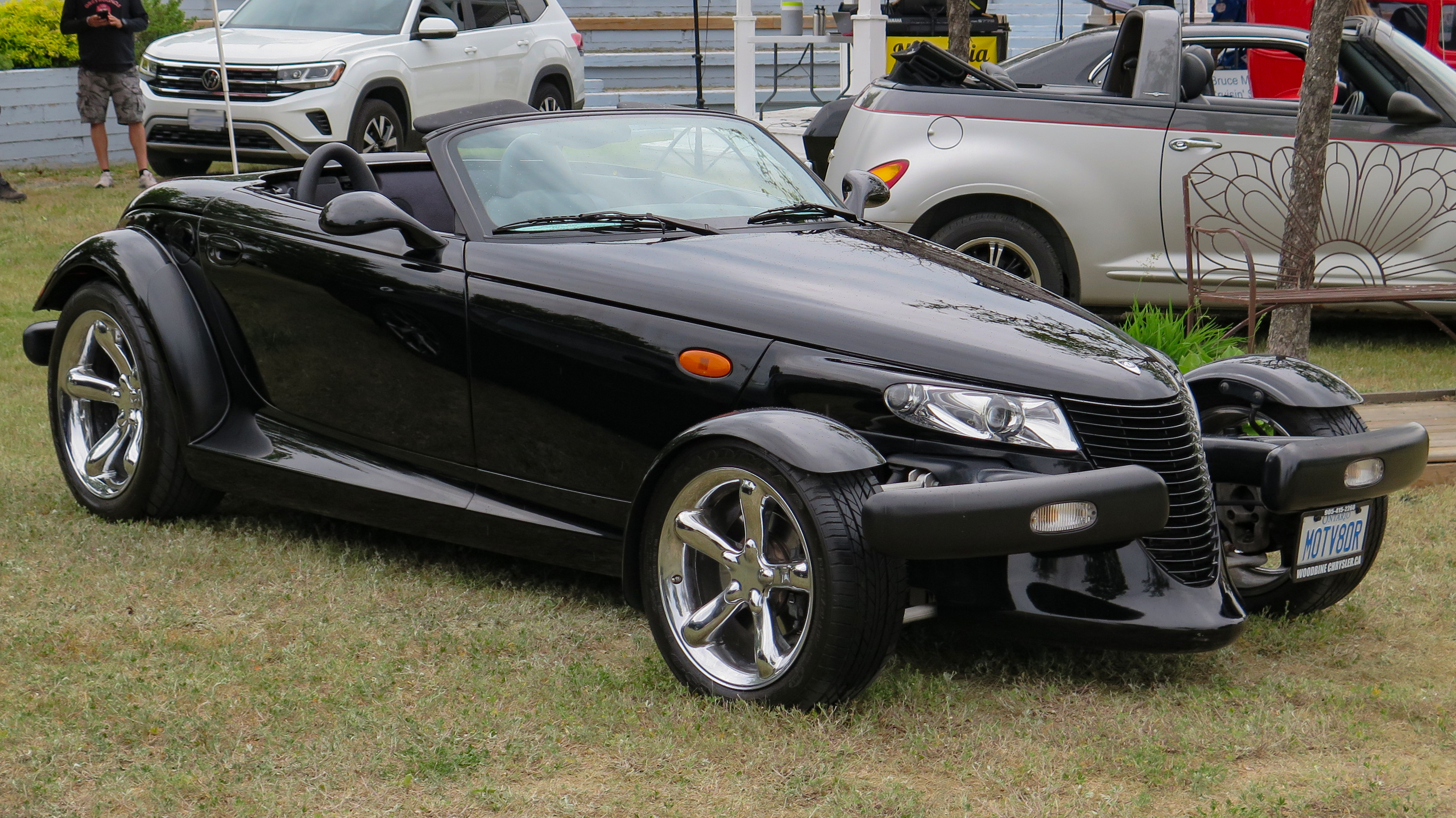
- 2000 Plymouth Prowler

Overview
- Manufacturer: Chrysler Corporation (1997–1998); DaimlerChrysler (1998–2002)
- Also called: Chrysler Prowler (2000–2002)
- Production: 1997–2002; 11,702 produced
- Assembly: Detroit, Michigan, U.S.
- Designer: Tom Gale

Body and chassis
- Class: Sports car
- Body style: Two-door roadster
- Layout: Front mid-engine, rear-wheel-drive
- Platform: Chrysler PR platform

Powertrain
- Engine: 3.5 L EGG V6
- Transmission: 4-speed 42LE automatic

Dimensions
- Wheelbase: 113.3 in (2,878 mm)
- Length: 165.3 in (4,199 mm)
- Width: 76.5 in (1,943 mm)
- Height: 50.9 in (1,293 mm)
- Curb weight: 2,800 lb (1,270 kg)

Chronology
- Successor: Chrysler Crossfire

The Plymouth Prowler, later the Chrysler Prowler, is a two-door, two-seat sports car, manufactured and marketed by DaimlerChrysler for model years 1997 through 2002. It is widely known for its hand-crafted aluminum bodywork and its retro-hot rod styling with open, Indy racer-style front wheels.

Based on the 1993 concept car of the same name, Chrysler offered the Prowler over a single generation, with a V6 front-engine, and a rear-transaxle, rear-drive configuration. Total production was 11,702 Plymouth- and Chrysler-branded Prowlers.

== Design ==
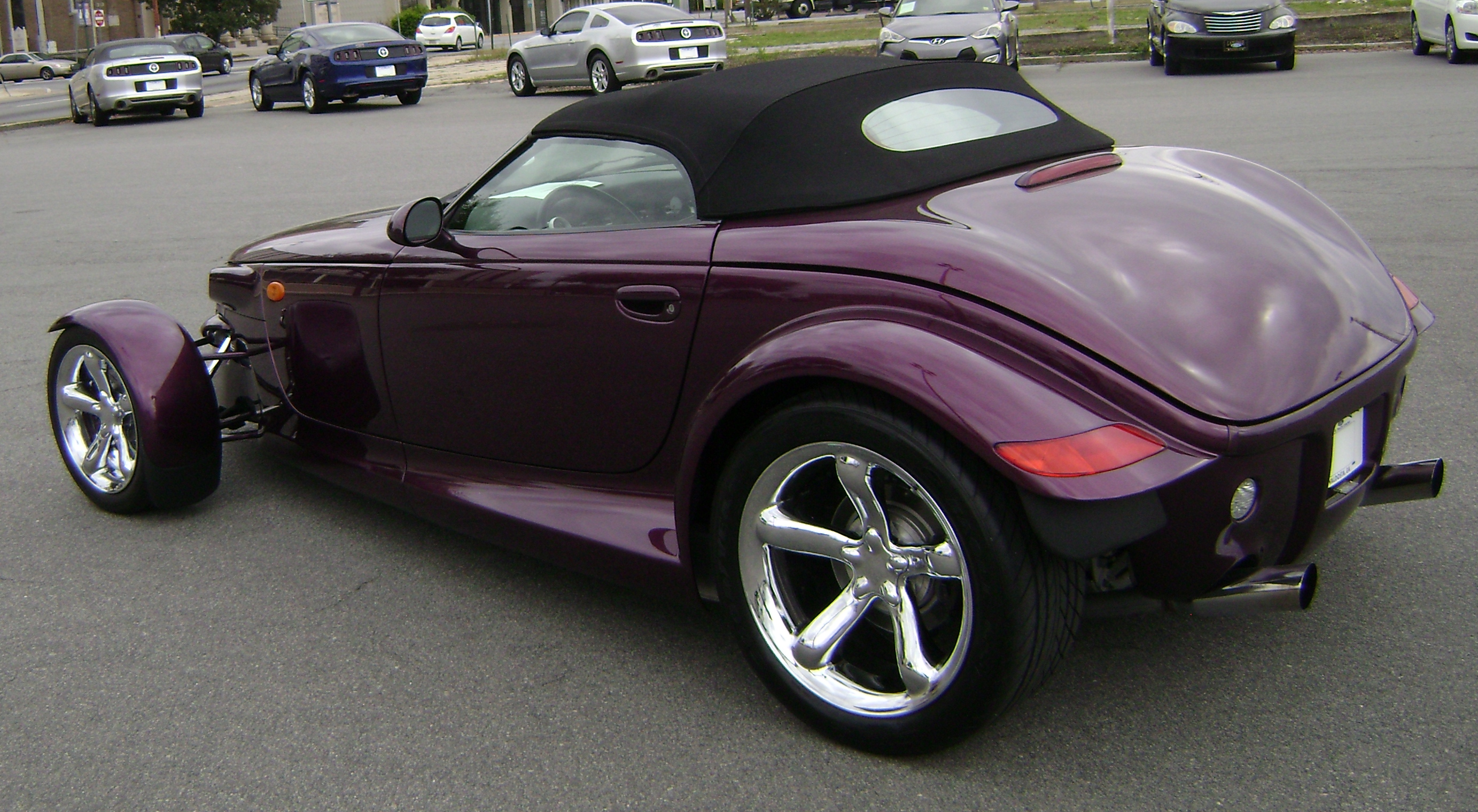
Rear

Chrysler's design and international director Thomas C. Gale said his "love for 1930s-era hot rods" inspired the Prowler." Gale, who has a hotted up 1932 Ford in his garage, approved the hotrod-inspired Plymouth Prowler as the company's follow-up show-stopper to the Dodge Viper.

Another early influence is credited to a Chrysler-sponsored project at the Art Center College of Design, resulting in a thesis project by Douglas "Chip" Foose, which included drawings of a retro-roadster. Foose "designed it as a coupe for Chrysler to begin with, but modified it to a roadster version."

The Prowler used a powertrain from Chrysler's LH-cars, a 24-valve, 3.5 L Chrysler SOHC V6 engine producing 214 hp (160 kW; 217 PS) at 5850 rpm. For model year 1999, the engine was upgraded to a more powerful, aluminum block, 253 hp (189 kW; 257 PS) at 6400 rpm version. The engines were coupled to a four-speed Autostick semi-automatic transmission at the rear of the vehicle. Power to the transaxle from the engine was via an open tube-type drive shaft that rotated at engine speed, described as a "torque tube". However, it was not a stationary enclosure, as is the drive shaft within a rigid torque tube connecting a front engine and rear-mounted transaxle, such as on the C5 Corvette, Porsche 944, and Alfa Romeo 75. Placement of the transmission in the rear helped achieve the Prowler's desirable 50-50 front-rear weight distribution.

The Prowler was the first rear-wheel drive Plymouth since the 1989 Plymouth Gran Fury and became the last Plymouth model with the layout. While criticized for having its V6 engine, Chrysler's High Output 3.5 L had a horsepower rating similar to (or higher than) the company's Magnum V8s of that era. While not making nearly as much torque as a V8, the Prowler's light weight helped to achieve 0 to 60 mph acceleration in just over 7 seconds.

The car prominently featured aluminum construction, which, in many cases, was adhesively bonded, chiefly in the chassis. The body was produced in Shadyside, Ohio. The car was assembled by hand at the Conner Avenue Assembly Plant (CAAP) in Detroit, Michigan.

== Features ==
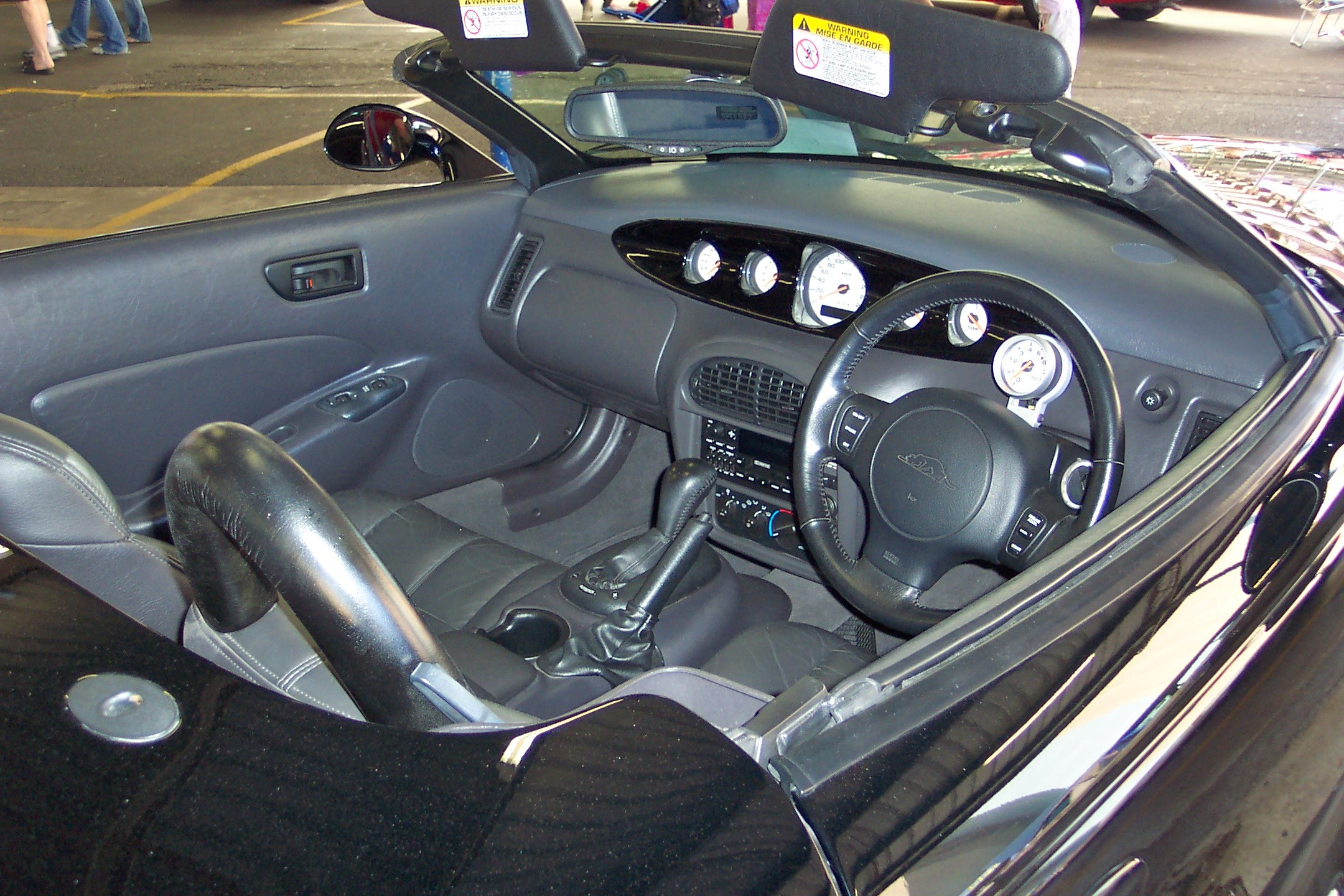
Interior

Unlike the Dodge Viper, the Prowler was equipped with many features that allowed it to be used as a daily driver. These features included keyless entry, power windows, and door locks, dual airbags, leather-trimmed bucket seats, air conditioning with manual controls, a high-fidelity sound system with AM/FM stereo and cassette player (a multi-disc CD changer was an available option), a leather-wrapped steering wheel with audio system controls mounted on the rear of the wheel, a color-keyed instrument panel bezel painted to match the exterior color of the Prowler (a similar feature found on the Chrysler PT Cruiser, which was also originally intended to be sold as a Plymouth), digital odometer and full instrumentation, and, on later models, a speed-sensitive volume control activated via a switch mounted on the Prowler's instrument panel.

== Performance ==
- 1997 model
  - 0-60 mph (0–97 km/h): 7.2 seconds
  - Top speed: 118 mph (190 km/h) electronically limited
- 1999–2002 model
  - 0-60 mph (0–97 km/h): 5.9 seconds
  - Top speed: 126 mph (203 km/h) electronically limited

== Production ==
The Plymouth Prowler was produced for 1997 and then for the 1999 and 2000 model years. After the Plymouth brand was discontinued in 2001, the Prowler was marketed as a Chrysler Prowler for the 2001 and 2002 model years. However, DaimlerChrysler continued to market the Prowler as a Plymouth in Canada for the 2000 model year; the Prowler was the last Plymouth sold in Canada.

Model year production figures
1997	457
1999	3,921
2000	2,746
2001	3,142
2002	1,436
Total Plymouth Prowlers	8,532
Total Chrysler Prowlers	3,170
Grand total production	11,702

The last Prowler was built on February 15, 2002, and the model niche was later filled by the Chrysler Crossfire in 2004.

=== Colors ===
Across the two production runs, the Prowler was available in 12 colors.

- Prowler purple metallic (only color available in 1997)
- Prowler yellow clear coat
- Prowler black clearcoat
- Prowler red clearcoat
- Prowler bright silver metallic
- Woodward Edition (two-tone black/red)
- Black Tie Edition (two-tone black/silver)
- Prowler orange pearl coat
- Midnight blue pearl coat – Mulholland Edition
- Inca gold pearl coat
- Deep candy red pearl coat
- High voltage blue pearl coat – Conner Avenue Edition (only one produced, auctioned at Christie's)
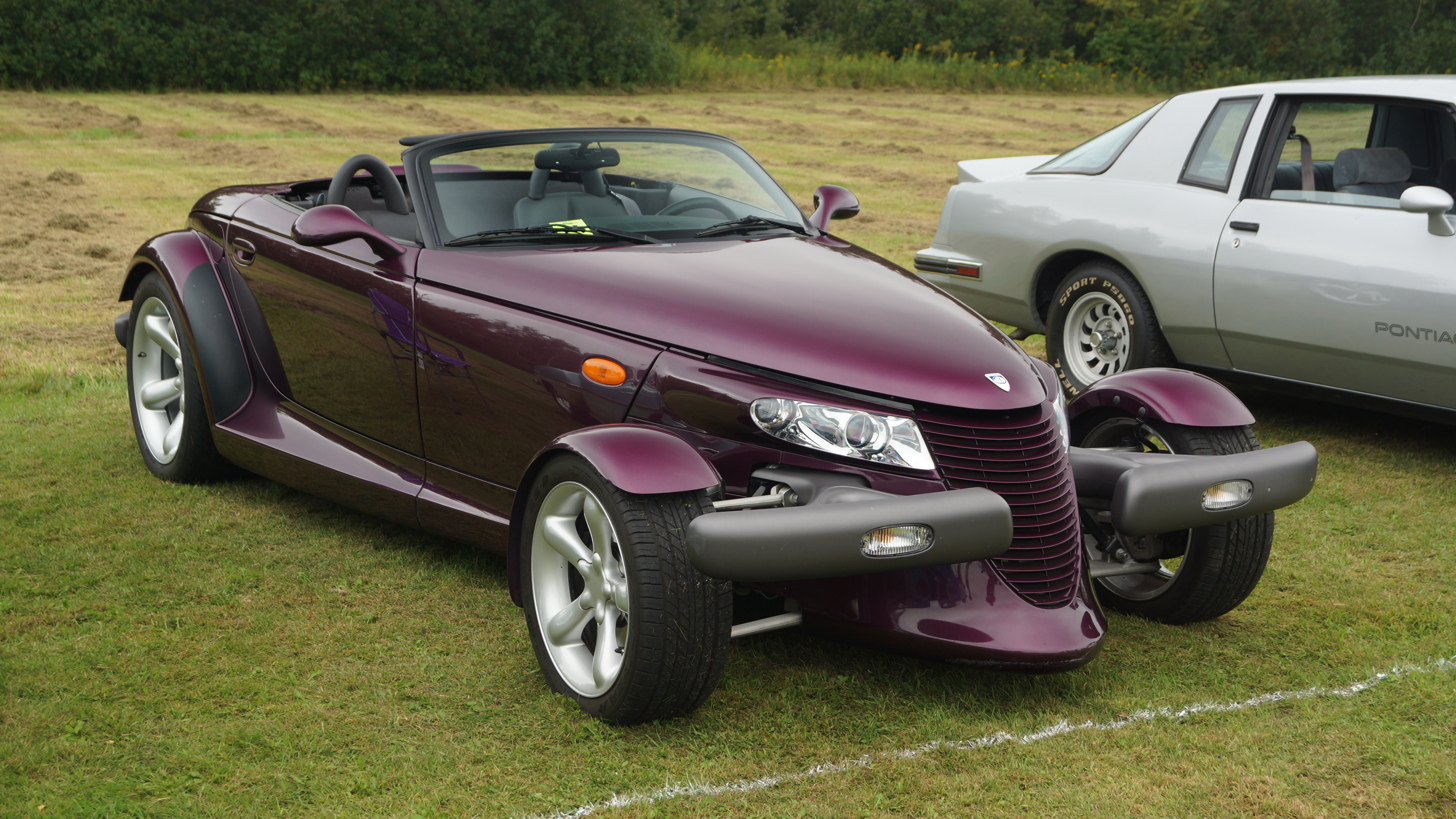
Purple metallic

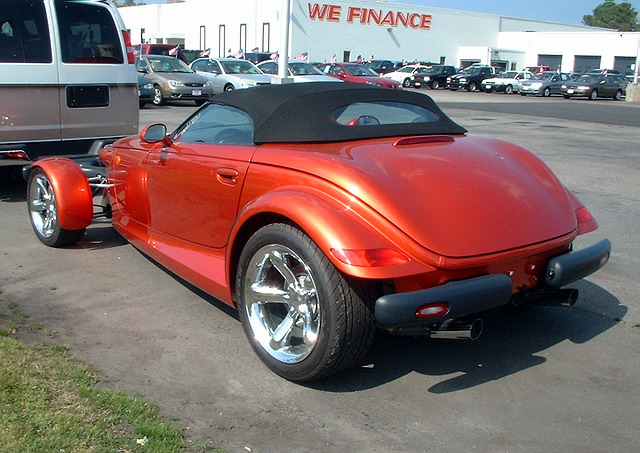
Orange pearl coat

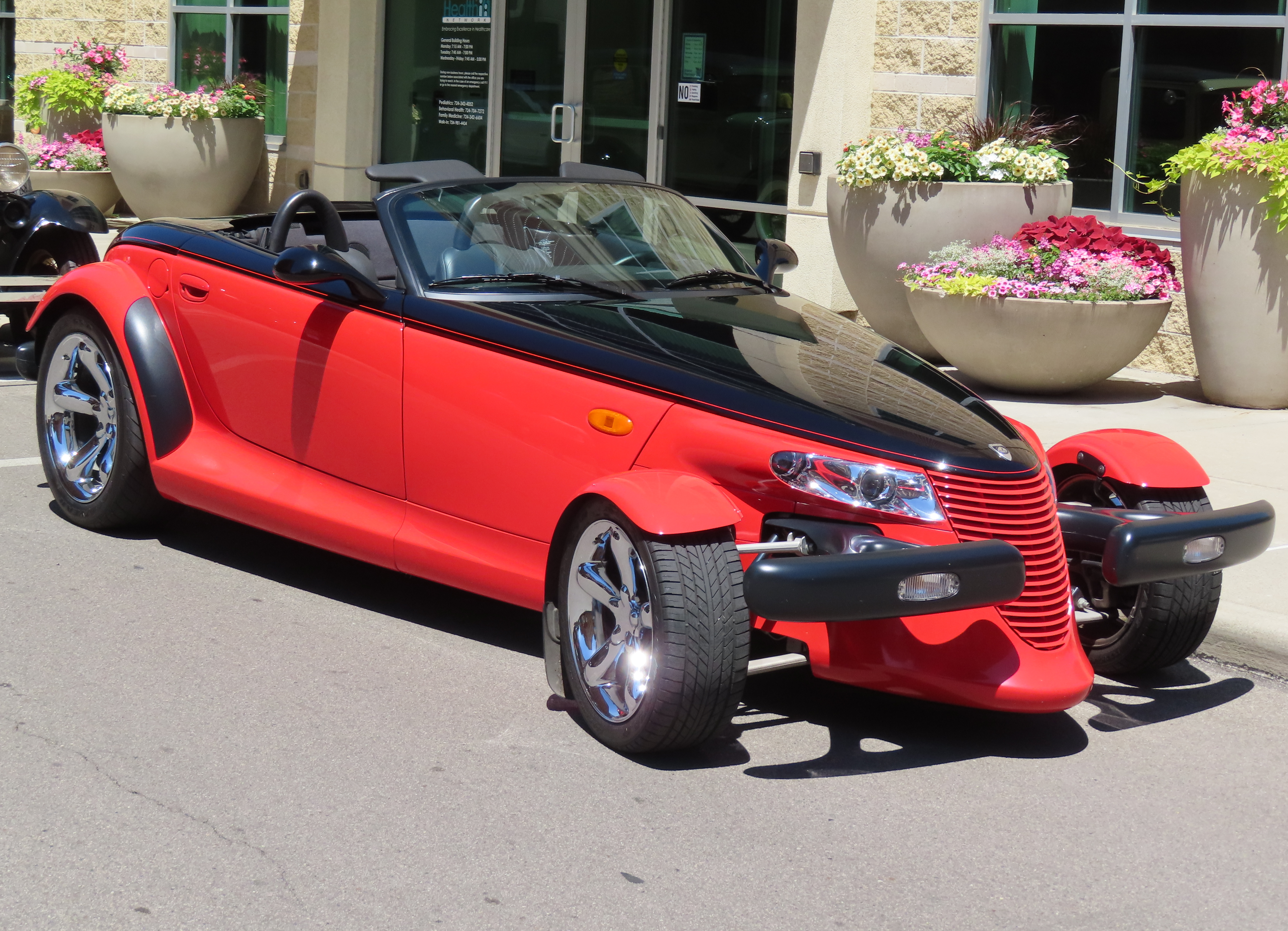
Prowler Woodward Edition

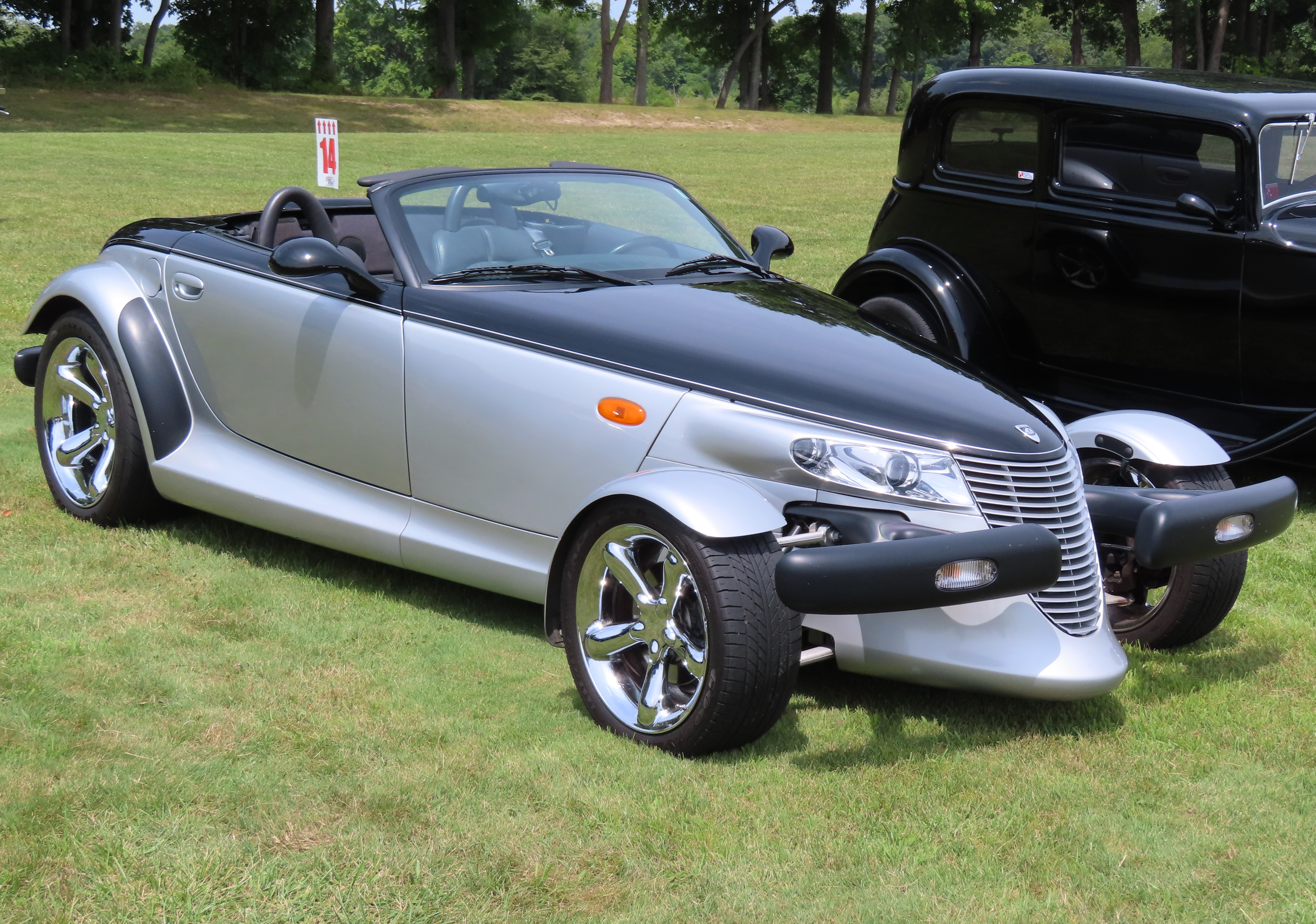
Prowler Black Tie Edition

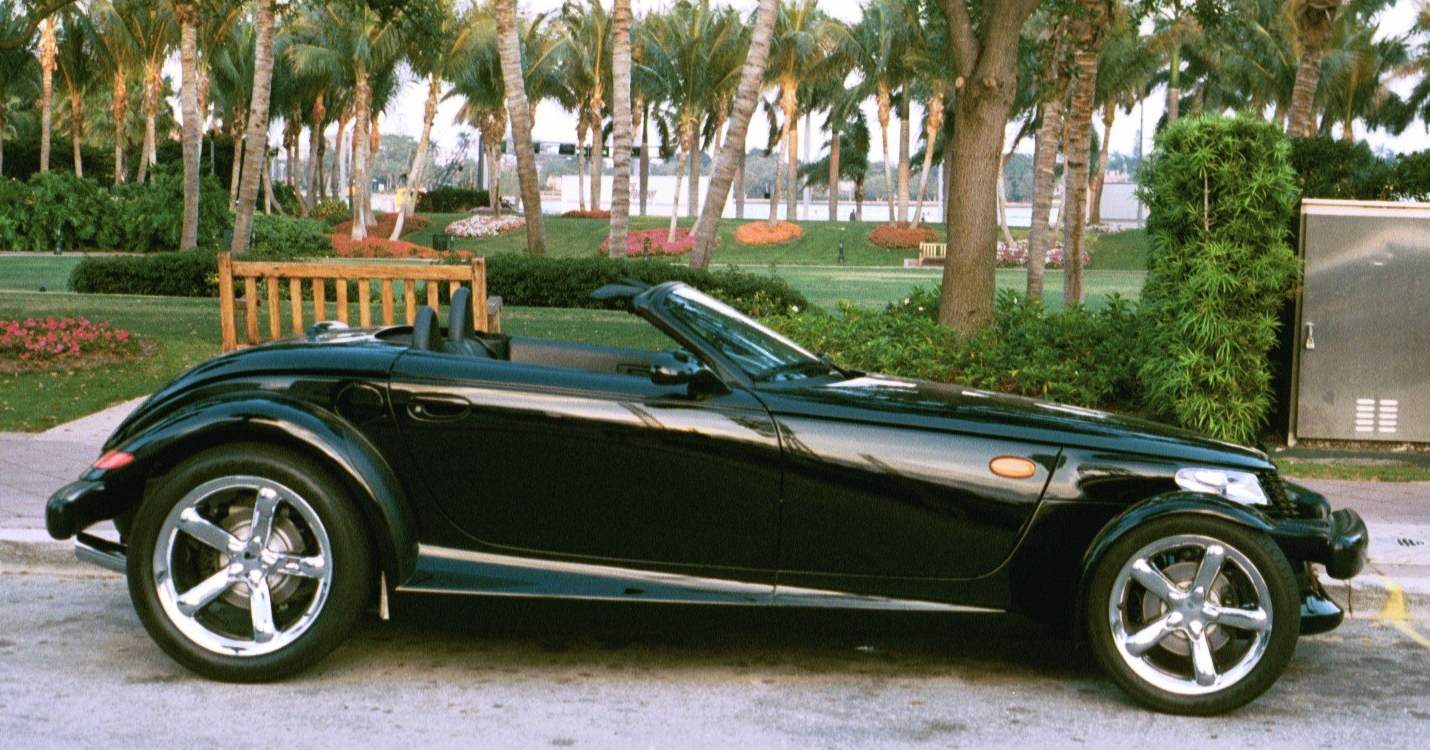
Black

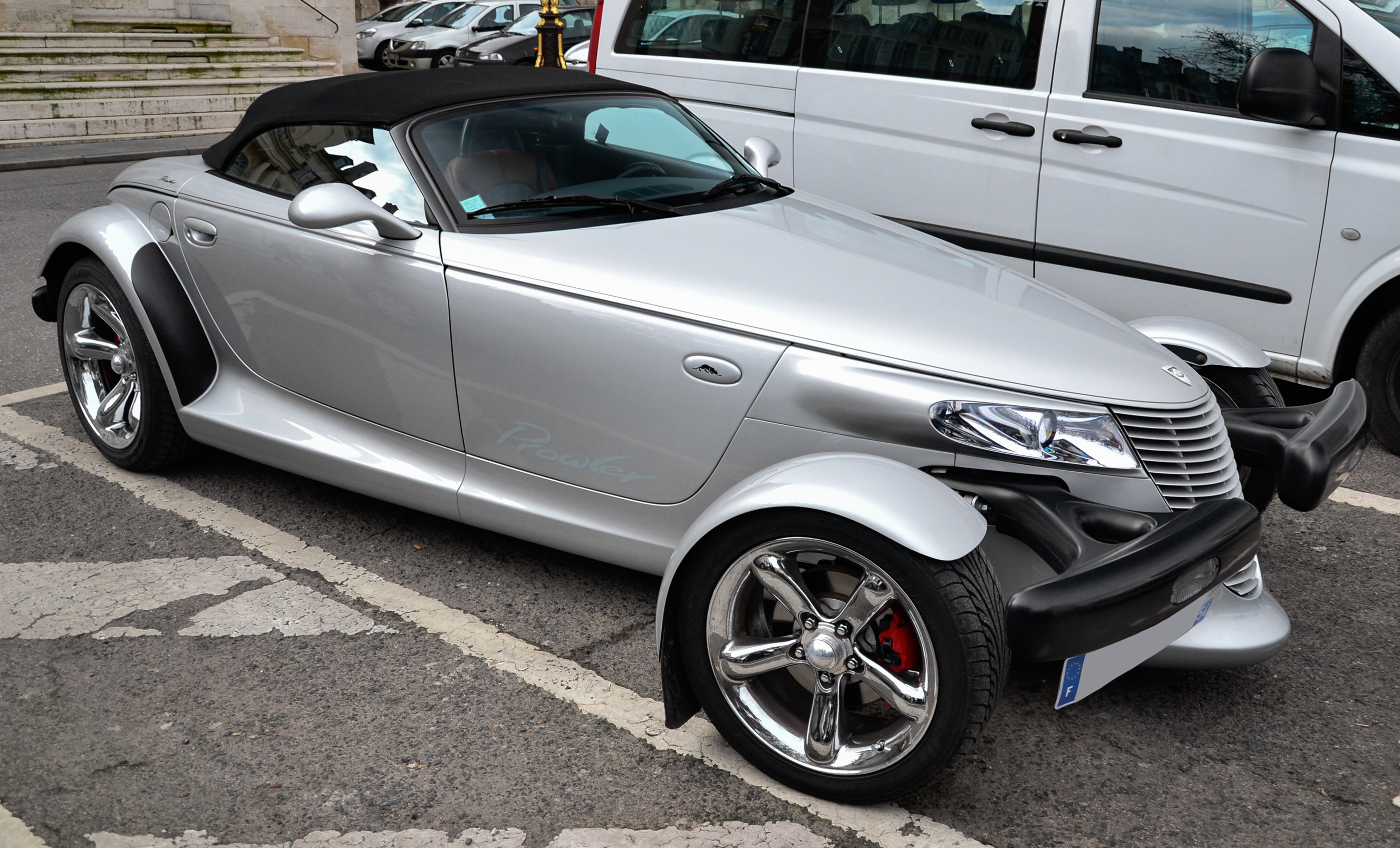
Bright silver metallic

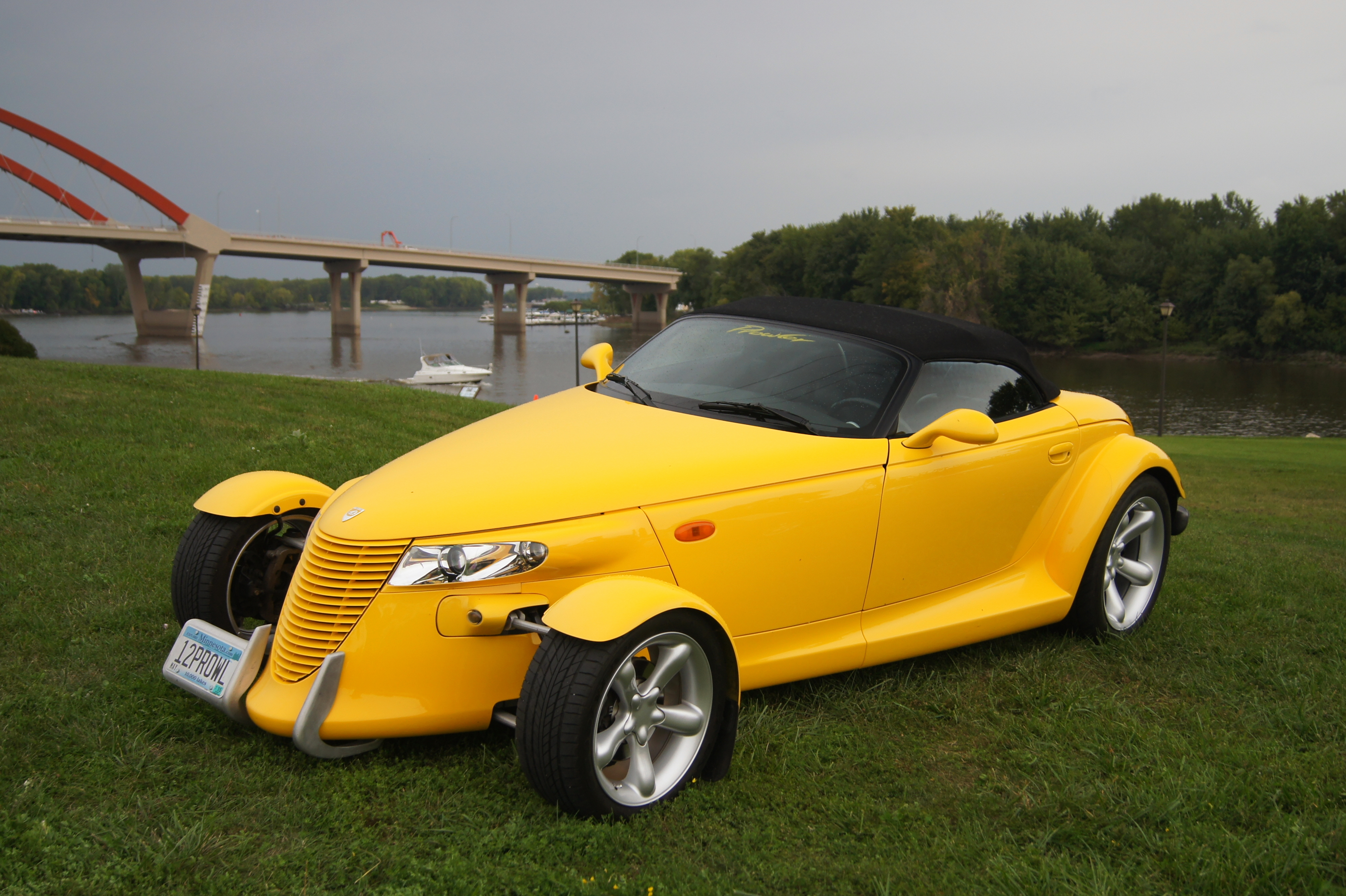
Yellow

=== Other features ===
- Wheels front: 17" × 7"
- Wheels rear: 20" × 10"
- Tires front: 225/45 HR17
- Tires rear: 295/40 HR20
- Brakes front/rear: composite 11" vented disc / 13" vented disc
- Towing capacity: 1,000 lbs (braked trailer)

=== Pricing ===
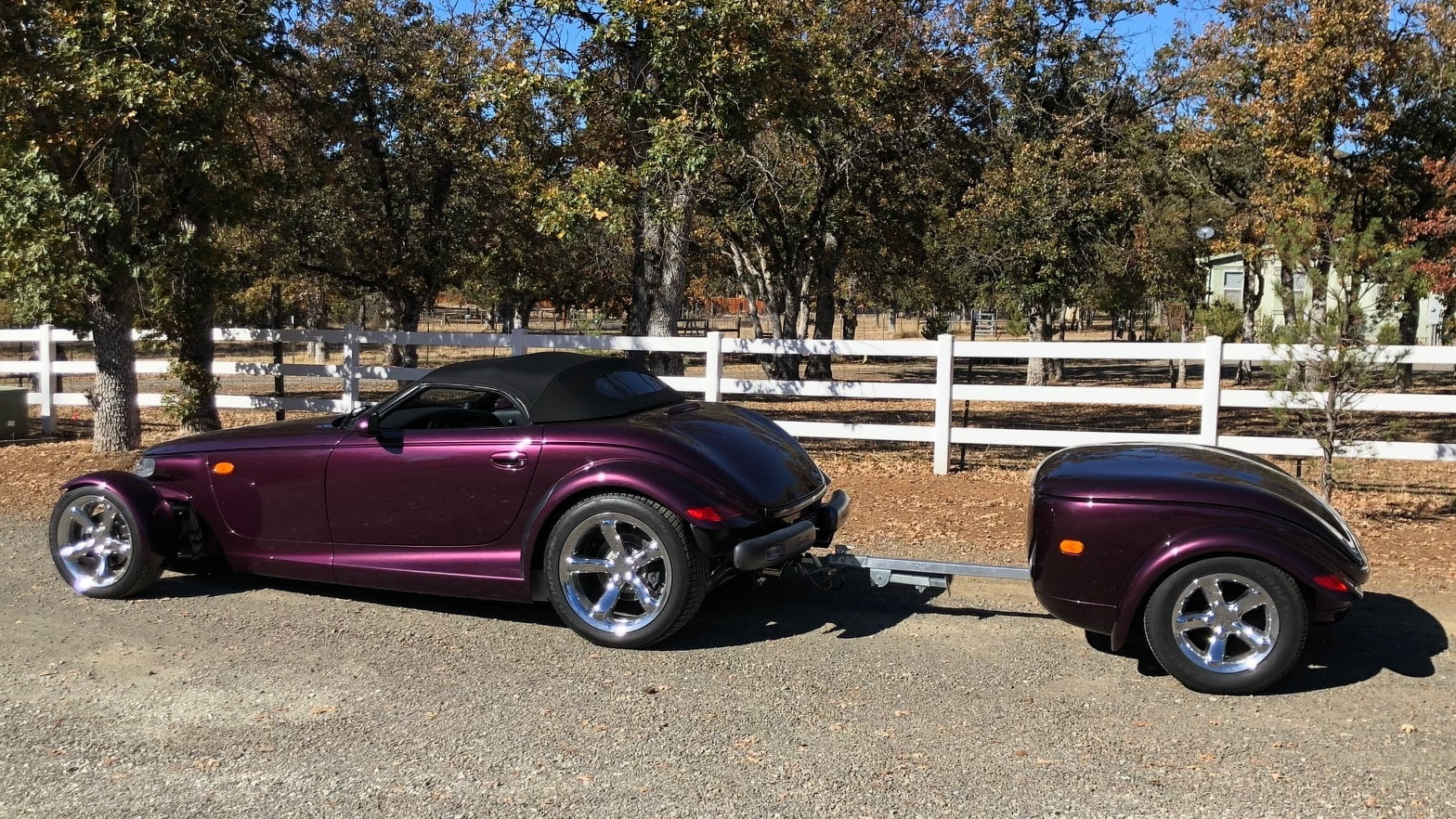
Prowler with trailer

The original manufacturer's suggested retail price (in US$) for each model year for the Prowler:

- 1997 – $38,300
- 1999 – $39,300
- 2000 – $43,000
- 2001 – $44,225
- 2002 – $44,625

Due to limited trunk space, a $5,000 Prowler trailer option was available from Chrysler dealers. These trailers resembled the back end of a Prowler and had 15-inch versions of the five-spoke wheels found on the car. They could be ordered to match a car's factory color. The vehicles were equipped with a trailer hitch to accommodate the trailer option; however, a warning was affixed to the hitch indicating that it was not to be used to tow any other trailer, such as for a boat, camper, etc. Doing so would void the factory warranty.

== Legacy ==
In 1998, a Plymouth Prowler was sealed in a mausoleum as a time capsule in Tulsa, Oklahoma. While similar in concept to the buried 1957 Plymouth Belvedere that had been buried below-ground near the courthouse and was heavily damaged by the failure of its vault, the Prowler was sealed in Centennial Park in an above-ground vault and sealed within a plastic box instead of plastic sheets that covered the Belvedere. Experts believe the Prowler has a better chance of surviving when the time capsule is opened in 2048 and it is returned to Chrysler.

In 1999, Chrysler unveiled the Plymouth Howler concept at the Specialty Equipment Market Association's annual car show in Las Vegas, Nevada. Inspired by hot rod trucks and based on the Prowler, the Howler featured a small, truck-like bed with a tailgate and hard tonneau cover. Under the hood, an adapted version of Jeep's new 4.7 L PowerTech V8 engine replaced the production model's 3.5 L V6. A BorgWarner five-speed manual replaced the production four-speed automatic.

Chrysler Corporation hosted a tenth-anniversary celebration on August 16, 2007, at the Walter P. Chrysler Museum in Auburn Hills, Michigan, to commemorate the production of the Plymouth Prowler in 1997.
