= Detroit Assembly Complex – Mack =

American automobile assembly factory

- Location: 4000 St. Jean Avenue Detroit, Michigan United States
- Coordinates: 42°23′03″N 82°58′44″W
- Industry: Automotive
- Products: Jeep Grand Cherokee
- Employees: 4,103 (2022)
- Area: 178 acres (72 ha)
- Volume: 2,500,000 sq ft (230,000 m^{2})
- Owners: Michigan Stamping Company (1916–1920); Briggs Manufacturing Company (1920–1953); Chrysler (1953–1979); City of Detroit (1982–1990); Chrysler (1990–1998); DaimlerChrysler (1998–2007); Chrysler (2007–2014); Fiat Chrysler Automobiles (2014–2021); Stellantis (2021–present)

Detroit Assembly Complex – Mack, previously known as the Mack Avenue Engine Complex, is a Stellantis North America automobile assembly factory in Detroit, Michigan. The plant is located adjacent to the Detroit Assembly Complex – Jefferson plant.

== History ==
The original factory ("Old Mack") was built in 1916 by the Michigan Stamping Company. When Michigan Stamping was sold to Briggs Manufacturing Company in 1920, Briggs made bodies there for Plymouth, Ford, and others. Chrysler Corporation bought Mack Avenue and 11 other plants from Briggs in 1953. It continued to use it as a stamping plant for the nearby Dodge Main factory, Lynch Road Assembly, and Jefferson Avenue Assembly plants as well as other assembly plants in the US and Canada.

In 1975, a new 1 million square foot addition was added to the original plant to assemble suspension frames.

In 1980, a financially hurting Chrysler closed the original plant while retaining the new addition (called "New Mack" within the company)to continue building frames for the company's rear-wheel-drive M- body cars through 1982. The old plant was sold to the city of Detroit in late 1982 with the hopes the city could find a new industrial user for the plant. Unfortunately the city could not find a buyer and the old plant became derelict, overgrown, and a toxic brownfield. Chrysler used the "New Mack" facility as a warehouse until 1988, when the company converted the facility to an engineering tryout facility for new manufacturing methods (New Mack Process Development Center). "New Mack" was later used to build the first versions of the Dodge Viper in 1992. In 1995, Chrysler announced that it would spend upwards of 500 million to produce a new engine at the New Mack facility. It was part of an economic development project in which the old Mack facility would be torn down and remediated.

The new engine factory floor space covered 1,400,000 square feet (130,000 m^{2}). and added an additional 650,000 square feet (60,000 m^{2}) when the "Mack Engine II" plant was added in 1999. The Viper moved to a newly purchased facility-Conner Avenue Assembly- while the Mack plant was being prepared for engine production .ref name=mack />

In April 2013, Mack Engine I produced the last PowerTech 4.7 L V8 engine and retooled to produce the Pentastar V6 engine. To switch to Pentastar production, 197 million dollars was invested in the Mack Engine I, and up to 250 jobs are to be added.

In December 2018, Fiat Chrysler Automobiles announced that the Mack Avenue Engine Complex would be reopened and converted back into a vehicle assembly plant, to make the next generation Jeep Grand Cherokee starting in 2021.. A new paint facility was built over the footprint of the old Mack Stamping building. What was Mack Engine II became the body shop for the new operation, and the former Mack I Engine plant serves as the new operation's final assembly area.

== Products ==
=== Current ===
- Jeep Grand Cherokee

=== Previous ===
- 4.7 L Chrysler PowerTech engine V8 (Mack Engine I)
- 3.7 L Chrysler PowerTech engine V6 (Mack Engine II)
- 3.0 L, 3.2 L, and 3.6 L Chrysler Pentastar engine V6 (Mack Engine I)

== See also ==
- List of Chrysler factories
