= Mount Elliott Tool and Die =

Mount Elliott Tool & Die
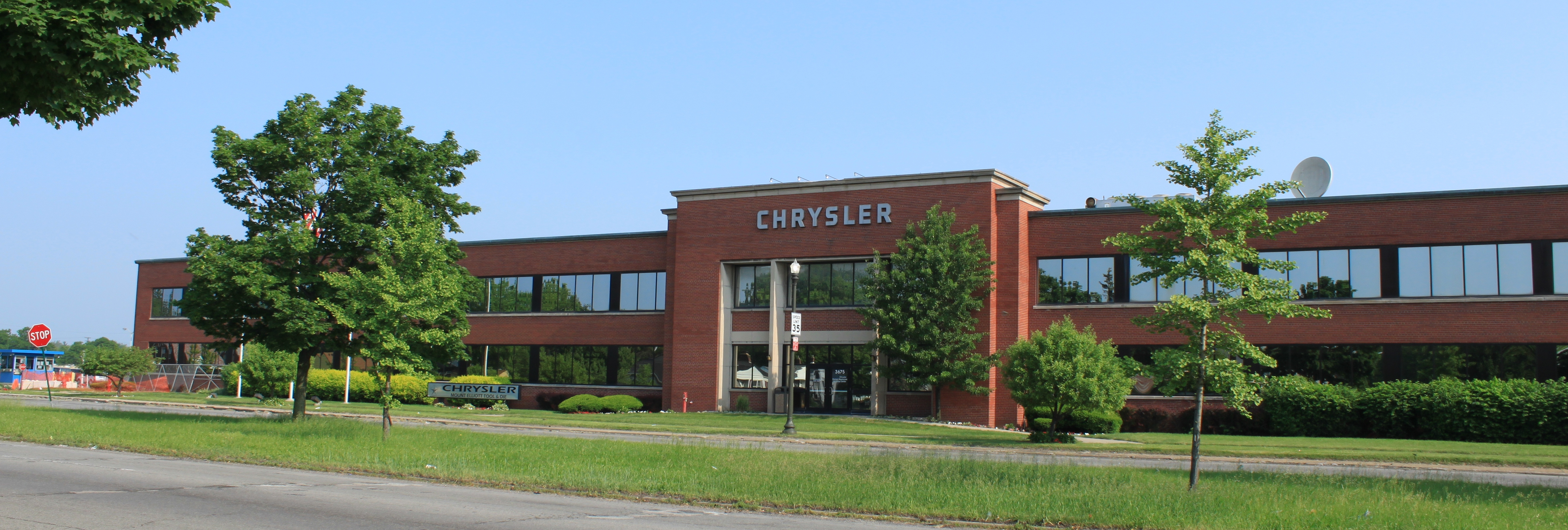
- View of the factory in 2011
- Operated: 1938–present
- Location: 3675 East Outer Drive; Detroit, Michigan, United States
- Coordinates: 42.4416°N 83.0403°W
- Industry: Automotive
- Products: stamping
- Employees: 300
- Area: 303 acres (1.23 km^{2})
- Volume: 725,000 sq ft (67,400 m^{2})
- Owners: Briggs Manufacturing Company (1938–1956); Chrysler (1956–1998); DaimlerChrysler (1998–2007); Chrysler (2007–2014); Fiat Chrysler Automobiles (2014–2021); Stellantis (2021–present)

Mount Elliott Tool and Die is a Stellantis North America automotive stamping plant in Detroit, Michigan that produces stamping dies, checking fixtures, and stamping fixtures.

It was built in 1938 by the Briggs Manufacturing Company. Chrysler purchased the plant in 1956 and it became Outer Drive Stamping plant. The facility became a tool and die plant after Vernor Tool & Die closed in 1983 and moved their operations there. The facility was then renamed Outer Drive Manufacturing Technology Center.

After the "Pilot Operations" and "Advanced Stamping Manufacturing Engineering" were moved to Chrysler Headquarters in Auburn Hills, Michigan in the 1980s, the facility was renamed "Mt. Elliott Tool and Die".

Mount Elliott previously employed around 300 people and is home to UAW Local 212. As of late 2018, Mount Elliot is currently idled. METD HOLDINGS purchased the facility from Stellantis in 2024, and Laepple Automotive plans to establish its new U.S. headquarters and main operations here.
