= Trenton Engine Complex =

Automobile factory

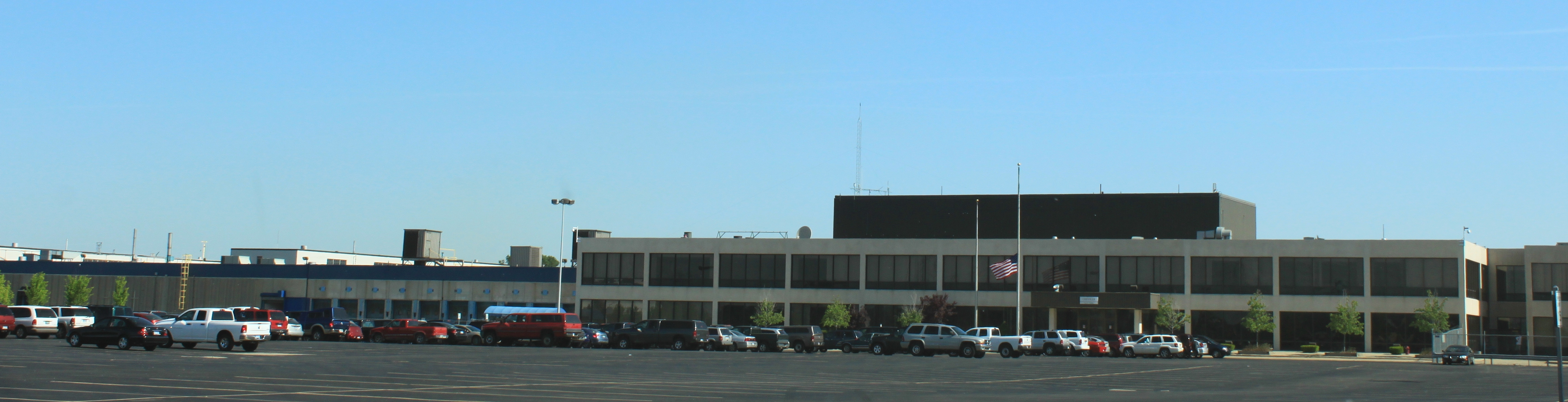
- The plant pictured in 2011
- Operated: 1952–present
- Location: 2300 Van Horn Road; Trenton, Michigan
- Coordinates: 42.13°N 83.19°W
- Industry: Automotive
- Products: Engines
- Employees: 1,197 (2022)
- Area: 272 acres (1.10 km^{2})
- Volume: 2,922,000 sq ft (271,500 m^{2})
- Owners: Chrysler (1952–1998); DaimlerChrysler (1998–2007); Chrysler (2007–2014); Fiat Chrysler Automobiles (2014–2021); Stellantis (2021–present)

Trenton Engine Complex is a Stellantis North America automotive factory complex in Trenton, Michigan. It is composed of two plants, North and South. The north factory opened in 1952 while the south plant opened in 2010. Both factories manufacture 3.2 and 3.6 engines.

== Trenton Engine North Plant ==
The Trenton North Engine Plant opened in 1952 and underwent a major expansion in 1969. Trenton engine was the site chosen for production of the 2.2 L four-cylinder engine which debuted in 1980 in the K-cars. The factory was expanded again in 1985 with a $150 million investment to add production of the 2.5 L four-cylinder in a 324,000-square-foot (30,100 m^{2}) area formerly used for production of the Chrysler Slant 6 engine.

The Trenton Engine Plant produced all B and RB Chrysler Big Block V-8 Engines (350, 361, 383, 400, 413, 426 and 440 cu. inch) from their introduction in 1957 until their demise in 1979.

In 1988, Chrysler sold much of the machining equipment, as well as a license to the design, to First Auto Works of China. The Trenton plant largely switched to the new Chrysler 3.3 engine production, while FAW continued to build the 2.2.

Daimler Chrysler reportedly invested $297 million in 2005 to expand the Trenton Engine plant to prepare to build a new 4.0 L version of the SOHC V6 and to revitalize the 3.8 line.

The plant ceased building engines in May 2011 and Chrysler announced that it would invest $114 million to repurpose one-fifth or nearly 400,000 square feet of the plant for the production of core components for the Pentastar V-6 engine. In November 2012, the Company announced that it would invest an additional $40 million to add a flexible production line that can run both the Pentastar engine and the Tigershark (I-4) engine.

In May 2013, Trenton began producing the 3.6-liter Pentastar.

Current product:

- 3.6L Pentastar V6 engine (upgraded)

Former product:

- 2.0L World Gasoline Engine L4 engine

== Trenton Engine South Plant ==
In 2007 Chrysler announced a new 822,000-square-foot (76,400 m^{2}) engine plant to produce the Pentastar V6 engine. It has the annual capacity of 440,000 engines. The new facility is LEED Gold certified, with features such as Zero-Waste-to-Landfill processes, the use of native grasses and trees on the property, higher performance insulation and more efficient manufacturing processes, fluorescent lighting, and efficient heating and cooling systems. Overall, Chrysler expects to save approximately US$1,300,000 annually on energy costs while reducing annual CO_{2} emissions by 12,000 metric tons.

Current product:

- 3.2L Pentastar V6 engine
- 3.6L Pentastar V6 engine
