= ZF 9HP transmission =

World's first 9-speed automatic from 2013

ZF 9HP

Overview
- Manufacturer: ZF Friedrichshafen
- Production: 2013–present
- Assembly: Gray Court, South Carolina, United States

Body and chassis
- Class: 9-speed transverse automatic transmission
- Related: Aisin-Toyota 8-speed · ZF 8HP

Chronology
- Predecessor: ZF 4HP

9HP is the trademark name for the ZF Friedrichshafen 9-speed automatic transmission models (9-speed transmission with Hydraulic converter and Planetary gearsets) for transverse engine applications, designed by ZF's subsidiary in Saarbrücken and built in Gray Court, South Carolina. It is used in front-wheel drive and all-wheel drive vehicles.

The 9HP is the world's first 9-speed automatic transmission for passenger cars. Land Rover and Jeep launched it at the 2013 Geneva Motor Show. The 2014 Jeep Cherokee then was the first car with this transmission delivered to customers.

== Key data ==
Gear ratios (Note: Differences in gear ratios have a measurable, direct impact on vehicle dynamics, performance, waste emissions as well as fuel mileage)
Model	First Deliv- ery	Gear										Total Span			Avg. Step	Components		Nomenclature			
Model	First Deliv- ery	R	1	2	3	4	5	6	7	8	9	Nomi- nal	Effec- tive	Cen- ter	Avg. Step	Total	per Gear (Note: Forward gears only)	Gears Count	Cou- pling	Gear- sets	Maximum Input Torque
9HP 28 9HP 48	2013	−3.805	4.700	2.842	1.909	1.382	1.000	0.808	0.699	0.580	0.479	9.808	7.940	1.501	1.330	4 Gearsets; 3 Brakes; 3 Clutches	1.111	9	H (Note: Hydraulic torque converter· German: Hydraulischer Wandler oder Drehmomentwandler)	P (Note: Planetary gearing · German: Planetenradsätze)	280 N⋅m (207 lb⋅ft) (Note: for both gasoline and diesel); 450 N⋅m (332 lb⋅ft) (Note: for gasoline); 480 N⋅m (354 lb⋅ft) (Note: for diesel)

== History ==
Production of the 9HP started in 2013 at ZF's Gray Court facility in Laurens, South Carolina. 400,000 units are produced per year.

Production of the 9HP for Fiat and Chrysler vehicles began in May 2013 at Indiana Transmission Plant I (ITPI), followed by Tipton Transmission Plant in Tipton County, Indiana in May 2014.

== Planetary gearset concept ==
=== Improved fuel economy ===
The main objective in replacing the predecessor model was to improve vehicle fuel economy with extra speeds and a wider gear span to allow the engine speed level to be lowered (downspeeding), which is a decisive factor in improving energy efficiency and thus reducing fuel consumption. In addition, the lower engine speed level improves the noise-vibration-harshness comfort and the exterior noise is reduced. ZF claims that it is able to save an average of 16% in fuel compared with current 6-speed automatic transmissions.

=== Reduced manufacturing complexity ===
In order to avoid a further increase in manufacturing complexity while expanding the number of gear ratios, ZF switched from the conventional design method—in which the planetary gearset concept was limited to a purely serial or in-line power flow—to a more modern design method that utilizes a planetary gearset concept with combined parallel and serial power flow. This was only possible thanks to computer-aided design and has resulted in a globally patented gearset concept. The resulting progress is reflected in a better ratio of the number of gears to the number of components used compared to existing layouts. The 8HP has become the new reference standard (benchmark) for automatic transmissions.

Planetary gearset concept: manufacturing complexity (Note: Progress increases cost-effectiveness and is reflected in the ratio of forward gears to main components. It depends on the power flow: parallel: using the two degrees of freedom of planetary gearsets; to increase the number of gears; with unchanged number of components; serial: in-line combined planetary gearsets without using the two degrees of freedom; to increase the number of gears; a corresponding increase in the number of components is unavoidable)
With Assessment	Output: Gear Ratios	Innovation Elasticity (Note: Innovation elasticity classifies progress and market position: Automobile manufacturers drive forward technical developments primarily in order to remain competitive or to achieve or defend technological leadership. This technical progress has therefore always been subject to economic constraints; Only innovations whose relative additional benefit is greater than the relative additional resource input, i.e. whose economic elasticity is greater than 1, are considered for realization; The required innovation elasticity of an automobile manufacturer depends on its expected return on investment. The basic assumption that the relative additional benefit must be at least twice as high as the relative additional resource input helps with orientation; negative, if the output increases and the input decreases, is perfect; 2 or above is good; 1 or above is acceptable (red); below this is unsatisfactory (bold)) Δ Output : Δ Input	Input: Main Components			
With Assessment	Output: Gear Ratios	Innovation Elasticity Δ Output : Δ Input	Total	Gearsets	Brakes	Clutches
9HP Ref. Object	$n_{O1}$ $n_{O2}$	Topic	$n_I= n_G+$ $n_B+ n_C$	$n_{G1}$ $n_{G2}$	$n_{B1}$ $n_{B2}$	$n_{C1}$ $n_{C2}$
Δ Number	$n_{O1}- n_{O2}$	Topic	$n_{I1}- n_{I2}$	$n_{G1}- n_{G2}$	$n_{B1}- n_{B2}$	$n_{C1}- n_{C2}$
Relative Δ	Δ Output $\tfrac{n_{O1}- n_{O2}} {n_{O2}}$	$\tfrac{n_{O1}- n_{O2}} {n_{O2}}: \tfrac{n_{I1}- n_{I2}} {n_{I2}}$ $=\tfrac{n_{O1}- n_{O2}} {n_{O2}} \cdot \tfrac{n_{I2}} {n_{I1}- n_{I2}}$	Δ Input $\tfrac{n_{I1}- n_{I2}} {n_{I2}}$	$\tfrac{n_{G1}- n_{G2}} {n_{G2}}$	$\tfrac{n_{B1}- n_{B2}} {n_{B2}}$	$\tfrac{n_{C1}- n_{C2}} {n_{C2}}$
9HP 4HP (Note: Direct predecessor: To reflect the progress of the specific model change)	9 (Note: plus 1 reverse gear); 4	Progress	10; 7	4; 2 (Note: combined as a compound Ravigneaux gearset)	3; 2	3; 3
Δ Number	5	Progress	3	2	1	0
Relative Δ	1.250 $\tfrac{5} {4}$	2.917 $\tfrac{5} {4}: \tfrac{3} {7}= \tfrac{5} {4} \cdot \tfrac{7} {3}= \tfrac{35} {12}$	0.429 $\tfrac{3} {7}$	1.000 $\tfrac{2} {2}$	0.500 $\tfrac{1} {2}$	0.000 $\tfrac{0} {3}$
9HP Aisin (Note: Market predecessor: As the reference standard for transverse engine vehicles, the Aisins AWTF-80 SC reflects the progress for car manufacturer and customer at that time)	9; 4	Progress	10; 8	4; 3 (Note: of which two gearstets are combined as a compound Ravigneaux gearset)	3; 2	3; 3
Δ Number	3	Progress	2	1	1	0
Relative Δ	0.500 $\tfrac{3} {6}$	2.000 $\tfrac{3} {6}: \tfrac{2} {8}= \tfrac{1} {2} \cdot \tfrac{4} {1}= \tfrac{2} {1}$	0.250 $\tfrac{2} {8}$	0.333 $\tfrac{1} {3}$	0.333 $\tfrac{-1} {3}$	0.000 $\tfrac{0} {3}$
9HP 8HP (Note: Current reference standard (benchmark): The 8HP has become the new reference standard (benchmark) for automatic transmissions. Although designed for longitudinal installation, it is nevertheless the industry standard.)	9; 8	Current Market Position	10; 9	4; 4	3; 2	3; 3
Δ Number	1	Current Market Position	1	0	1	0
Relative Δ	0.125 $\tfrac{1} {8}$	1.125 $\tfrac{1} {8}: \tfrac{1} {9}= \tfrac{1} {8} \cdot \tfrac{9} {1}= \tfrac{9} {8}$	0.111 $\tfrac{1} {9}$	0.000 $\tfrac{0} {4}$	0.500 $\tfrac{1} {2}$	0.000 $\tfrac{0} {3}$
W9A 3-Speed (Note: Historical reference standard (benchmark): 3-speed transmissions with torque converters have established the modern market for automatic transmissions and thus made it possible in the first place, as this design proved to be a particularly successful compromise between cost and performance; It became the archetype and dominated the world market for around 3 decades, setting the standard for automatic transmissions. It was only when fuel consumption became the focus of interest that this design reached its limits, which is why it has now completely disappeared from the market; What has remained is the orientation that it offers as a reference standard (point of reference, benchmark) for this market for determining progressiveness and thus the market position of all other, later designs; All transmission variants consist of 7 main components; Typical examples are; Turbo-Hydramatic from GM; Cruise-O-Matic from Ford; TorqueFlite from Chrysler; Detroit Gear from BorgWarner for Studebaker; BW-35 from BorgWarner and as T35 from Aisin; 3N 71 from Nissan/Jatco; 3 HP from ZF Friedrichshafen; W3A 040 and W3B 050 from Mercedes-Benz)	9; 3	Historical Market Position	10; 7	4; 2	3; 3	3; 2
Δ Number	6	Historical Market Position	3	2	0	1
Relative Δ	2.000 $\tfrac{6} {3}$	4.667 $\tfrac{6} {3}: \tfrac{3} {7}= \tfrac{2} {1} \cdot \tfrac{7} {3}= \tfrac{14} {3}$	0.429 $\tfrac{3} {7}$	1.000 $\tfrac{1} {1}$	0.000 $\tfrac{0} {3}$	0.500 $\tfrac{1} {2}$

=== Quality ===
The 9HP is only 0.24 inches (6 mm) longer than, and weighs 16.5 lbs (7.5 kg) less than, the outgoing six-speed transmission. The compact packaging is achieved by using a number of innovative design features: a new compact hydraulic vane-type pump, two patented dog clutches, which replace bulkier conventional clutch packs, and a nested gear set.

Planetary gearset concept: gear ratio quality (Note: Revised 14 January 2026 Nomenclature: $S_n =$ sun gear: number of teeth; $R_n =$ ring gear: number of teeth; $\color{gray}{C_n = }$ carrier or planetary gear carrier (not needed); $s_n =$ sun gear: shaft speed; $r_n =$ ring gear: shaft speed; $c_n =$ carrier or planetary gear carrier: shaft speed; With $n =$ gear is: $i_n =$ gear ratio or transmission ratio; $\omega_{1;n} = \omega_t =$ shaft speed shaft 1: input (turbine) shaft; $\omega_{2;n} =$ shaft speed shaft 2: output shaft; $T_{1;n} = T_t =$ torque shaft 1: input (turbine) shaft; $T_{2;n} =$ torque shaft 2: output shaft; $\mu_n =$ torque ratio or torque conversion ratio; $\eta_n =$ efficiency; $i_0 =$ stationary gear ratio; $\eta_0 =$ (assumed) stationary gear efficiency)
In-Depth Analysis (Note: Gear ratio (transmission ratio) $i_n$ — speed conversion —: The gear ratio $i_n$ is the ratio of; input shaft speed $\omega_{1;n}$; to output shaft speed $\omega_{2;n}$; and therefore corresponds to the reciprocal of the shaft speeds; $i_n = \frac{1} {\frac{\omega_{2;n}} {\omega_{1;n}}} = \frac{\omega_{1;n}} {\omega_{2;n}} = \frac{\omega_t} {\omega_{2;n}}$) With Assessment And Torque Ratio (Note: Torque ratio (torque conversion ratio) $\mu_n$ — torque conversion —: The torque ratio $\mu_n$ is the ratio of; output torque $T_{2;n}$; to input torque $T_{1;n}$; minus efficiency losses; and therefore corresponds (apart from the efficiency losses) to the reciprocal of the shaft speeds too; $\mu_n = i_n \eta_{n;\eta_0} = \frac{\omega_{1;n} \eta_{n;\eta_0}} {\omega_{2;n}} = \frac{T_{2;n} \eta_{n;\eta_0}} {T_{1;n}}$; whereby $\eta_{n;\eta_0}$ may vary from gear to gear according to the formulas listed in this table and $0 \le \eta_{n;\eta_0} \le 1$) And Efficiency Calculation (Note: Efficiency: The efficiency $\eta_n$ is calculated; from the torque ratio; in relation to the gear ratio (transmission ratio); $\eta_n = \frac{\mu_n} {i_n}$; Power loss for single meshing gears; is in the range of 1 % to 1.5 %; helical gear pairs, which are used to reduce noise in passenger cars, are in the upper part of the loss range; spur gear pairs, which are limited to commercial vehicles due to their poorer noise comfort, are in the lower part of the loss range; Corridor for torque ratio and efficiency: in planetary gearsets, the stationary gear ratio $i_0$ is formed via the planetary gears and thus by two meshes; for reasons of simplification, the efficiency for both meshes together is commonly specified there; the efficiencies $\eta_0$ specified here are based on assumed efficiencies for the stationary ratio $i_0$; of $\eta_0 = 0.9800$ (upper value); and $\eta_0 = 0.9700$ (lower value); for both interventions together; The corresponding efficiency; for single-meshing gear pairs is ${\eta_0}^\tfrac {1}{2}$; at $0.9800^\tfrac{1} {2} = 0.98995$ (upper value); and $0.9700^\tfrac{1} {2} = 0.98489$ (lower value))				Planetary Gearset: Teeth (Note: Layout: Input and output are on the same side; Planetary gearset 4 is on the input (turbine) side; Input shafts are, if actuated, S_{1}, R_{1} + S_{3}, and C_{3} + R_{4}; Output shaft is C_{4})				Count	Nomi- nal (Note: Total ratio span (total gear ratio/total transmission ratio) nominal: $\frac{\omega_{2;n}} {\omega_{2;1}} = \frac{\frac{\omega_{2;n}} {\omega_{2;1} \omega_{2;n}}} {\frac{\omega_{2;1}} {\omega_{2;1} \omega_{2;n}}} = \frac{\frac{1} {\omega_{2;1}}} {\frac{1} {\omega_{2;n}}} = \frac{\frac{\omega_t} {\omega_{2;1}}} {\frac{\omega_t} {\omega_{2;n}}} = \frac{i_1} {i_n}$; A wider span enables the; downspeeding when driving outside the city limits; increase the climbing ability; when driving over mountain passes or off-road; or when towing a trailer) Effec- tive (Note: Total ratio span (total gear ratio/total transmission ratio) effective: $\frac{\omega_{2;n}} {max(\omega_{2;1};|\omega_{2;R}|)} = \frac{min(i_1;|i_R|)} {i_n}$; The span is only effective to the extent that; the reverse gear ratio; matches that of 1st gear; see also Standard R:1; Digression Reverse gear: is usually longer than 1st gear; the effective span is therefore of central importance for describing the suitability of a transmission; because in these cases, the nominal spread conveys a misleading picture; which is only unproblematic for vehicles with high specific power; Market participants: Manufacturers naturally have no interest in specifying the effective span; Users have not yet formulated the practical benefits that the effective span has for them; The effective span has not yet played a role in research and teaching; Contrary to its significance: the effective span has therefore not yet been able to establish itself; either in theory; or in practice.; End of digression)	Cen- ter (Note: Ratio span's center: $(i_1 i_n)^\frac{1} {2}$; The center indicates the speed level of the transmission; Together with the final drive ratio; it gives the shaft speed level of the vehicle)
In-Depth Analysis With Assessment And Torque Ratio And Efficiency Calculation				Planetary Gearset: Teeth				Count	Nomi- nal Effec- tive	Avg. (Note: Average gear step: $\left( \frac{\omega_{2;n}} {\omega_{2;1}} \right) ^\frac{1} {n-1} = \left( \frac{i_1} {i_n} \right) ^\frac{1} {n-1}$; There are $n-1$ gear steps between $n$ gears; with decreasing step width; the gears connect better to each other; shifting comfort increases)
Model Type	Version First Delivery · Weight			S_{4} (Note: Sun 4: sun gear of gearset 4) R_{4} (Note: Ring 4: ring gear of gearset 4)	S_{3} (Note: Sun 3: sun gear of gearset 3) R_{3} (Note: Ring 3: ring gear of gearset 3)	S_{2} (Note: Sun 2: sun gear of gearset 2) R_{2} (Note: Ring 2: ring gear of gearset 2)	S_{1} (Note: Sun 1: sun gear of gearset 1) R_{1} (Note: Ring 1: ring gear of gearset 1)	Brakes Clutches	Ratio Span	Gear Step (Note: Standard 50:50 — 50 % is above and 50 % is below the average gear step —: With steadily decreasing gear steps (yellow highlighted line Step); and a particularly large step from 1st to 2nd gear; the lower half of the gear steps (between the small gears; rounded down, here the first 4) is always larger; and the upper half of the gear steps (between the large gears; rounded up, here the last 4) is always smaller; than the average gear step (cell highlighted yellow two rows above on the far right); lower half: smaller gear steps are a waste of possible ratios (red bold); upper half: larger gear steps are unsatisfactory (red bold))
Gear	R	1	2	3	4	5	6	7	8	9
Gear Ratio	${i_R}$	${i_1}$	${i_2}$	${i_3}$	${i_4}$	${i_5}$	${i_6}$	${i_7}$	${i_8}$	${i_9}$
Step	$-\frac{i_R} {i_1}$ (Note: Standard R:1 — reverse and 1st gear have the same ratio —: The ideal reverse gear has the same transmission ratio as 1st gear; no impairment when maneuvering; especially when towing a trailer; a torque converter can only partially compensate for this deficiency; Plus 11.11 % minus 10 % compared to 1st gear is good; Plus 25 % minus 20 % is acceptable (red); Above this is unsatisfactory (bold); see also Total ratio span (total gear ratio/total transmission ratio) effective)	$\frac{i_1} {i_1}$	$\frac{i_1} {i_2}$ (Note: Standard 1:2 — gear step 1st to 2nd gear as small as possible —: With continuously decreasing gear steps (yellow marked line Step); the largest gear step is the one from 1st to 2nd gear, which; for a good speed connection and; a smooth gear shift; must be as small as possible; A gear ratio of up to 1.6667 : 1 (5 : 3) is good; Up to 1.7500 : 1 (7 : 4) is acceptable (red); Above is unsatisfactory (bold))	$\frac{i_2} {i_3}$	$\frac{i_3} {i_4}$	$\frac{i_4} {i_5}$	$\frac{i_5} {i_6}$	$\frac{i_6} {i_7}$	$\frac{i_7} {i_8}$	$\frac{i_8} {i_9}$
Δ Step (Note: From large to small gears (from right to left)) (Note: Standard STEP — from large to small gears: steady and progressive increase in gear steps —: Gear steps should; increase: Δ Step (first green highlighted line Δ Step) is always greater than 1; As progressive as possible: Δ Step is always greater than the previous step; Not progressively increasing is acceptable (red); Not increasing is unsatisfactory (bold))			$\tfrac{i_1} {i_2} : \tfrac{i_2} {i_3}$	$\tfrac{i_2} {i_3} : \tfrac{i_3} {i_4}$	$\tfrac{i_3} {i_4} : \tfrac{i_4} {i_5}$	$\tfrac{i_4} {i_5} : \tfrac{i_5} {i_6}$	$\tfrac{i_5} {i_6} : \tfrac{i_6} {i_7}$	$\tfrac{i_6} {i_7} : \tfrac{i_7} {i_8}$	$\tfrac{i_7} {i_8} : \tfrac{i_8} {i_9}$	
Shaft Speed	$\frac{i_1} {i_R}$	$\frac{i_1} {i_1}$	$\frac{i_1} {i_2}$	$\frac{i_1} {i_3}$	$\frac{i_1} {i_4}$	$\frac{i_1} {i_5}$	$\frac{i_1} {i_6}$	$\frac{i_1} {i_7}$	$\frac{i_1} {i_8}$	$\frac{i_1} {i_9}$
Δ Shaft Speed (Note: Standard SPEED — from small to large gears: steady increase in shaft speed difference —: Shaft speed differences should; increase: Δ Shaft Speed (second line marked in green Δ (Shaft) Speed) is always greater than the previous one; 1 difference smaller than the previous one is acceptable (red); 2 consecutive ones are a waste of possible ratios (bold))	$0 - \tfrac{i_1} {i_R}$	$\tfrac{i_1} {i_1} - 0$	$\tfrac{i_1} {i_2} - \tfrac{i_1} {i_1}$	$\tfrac{i_1} {i_3} - \tfrac{i_1} {i_2}$	$\tfrac{i_1} {i_4} - \tfrac{i_1} {i_3}$	$\tfrac{i_1} {i_5} - \tfrac{i_1} {i_4}$	$\tfrac{i_1} {i_6} - \tfrac{i_1} {i_5}$	$\tfrac{i_1} {i_7} - \tfrac{i_1} {i_6}$	$\tfrac{i_1} {i_8} - \tfrac{i_1} {i_7}$	$\tfrac{i_1} {i_9} - \tfrac{i_1} {i_8}$
Torque Ratio	$\mu_R$	$\mu_1$	$\mu_2$	$\mu_3$	$\mu_4$	$\mu_5$	$\mu_6$	$\mu_7$	$\mu_8$	$\mu_9$
Efficiency $\eta_n$	$\frac{\mu_R} {i_R}$	$\frac{\mu_1} {i_1}$	$\frac{\mu_2} {i_2}$	$\frac{\mu_3} {i_3}$	$\frac{\mu_4} {i_4}$	$\frac{\mu_5} {i_5}$	$\frac{\mu_6} {i_6}$	$\frac{\mu_7} {i_7}$	$\frac{\mu_8} {i_8}$	$\frac{\mu_9} {i_9}$
9HP 28 9HP 48	280 Nm (Note: 280 N⋅m (207 lb⋅ft) for both gasoline and diesel) · 2013 · 78 kg (172 lb); 450 Nm (Note: 450 N⋅m (332 lb⋅ft) for gasoline) · 2013 · 86 kg (190 lb); 480 Nm (Note: 480 N⋅m (354 lb⋅ft) for diesel) · 2013 · 86 kg (190 lb)			42; 110	42; 110	91 (Note: 91/133 or 104/152); 133	42; 86	3 (Note: Thereof 1 dog brake); 3 (Note: Thereof 1 dog clutch)	9.8085; 7.9402	1.5007
9HP 28 9HP 48	280 Nm · 2013 · 78 kg (172 lb); 450 Nm · 2013 · 86 kg (190 lb); 480 Nm · 2013 · 86 kg (190 lb)			42; 110	42; 110	91; 133	42; 86	3; 3	9.8085; 7.9402	1.3303
Gear	R	1	2	3	4	5	6	7	8	9
Gear Ratio	−3.8049 $-\tfrac{3,142,144}{825,825}$	4.7001 $\tfrac{184,832}{39,325}$	2.8419 $\tfrac{369,664}{130,075}$	1.9094 $\tfrac{5,776}{3,025}$	1.3818 $\tfrac{76}{55}$	1.0000 $\tfrac{1}{1}$	0.8081 $\tfrac{34,048}{42,133}$	0.6995 $\tfrac{6,272}{8,967}$	0.5802 $\tfrac{76}{131}$	0.4792 $\tfrac{2,176}{4,541}$
Step	0.8095	1.0000	1.6538	1.4884	1.3818	1.3818	1.2375	1.1553	1.2056	1.2107
Δ Step			1.1112	1.0771	1.0000	1.1167	1.0711	0.9583	0.9958	
Speed	–1.2353	1.0000	1.6538	2.4615	3.4014	4.7001	5.5816	6.7197	8.1015	9.8085
Δ Speed	1.2353	1.0000	0.6538	0.8077	0.9399	1.2987	1.1161	0.9035	1.3818	1.7066
Torque Ratio	–3.5391 –3.4099	4.5931; 4.5402	2.7922; 2.7675	1.8884; 1.8779	1.3742; 1.3704	1.0000	0.8005; 0.7966	0.6904; 0.6857	0.5717; 0.5673	0.4653; 0.4582
Efficiency $\eta_n$	0.9302; 0.8962	0.9772; 0.9660	0.9825; 0.9738	0.9890; 0.9835	0.9945; 0.9917	1.0000	0.9906; 0.9857	0.9870; 0.9803	0.9854; 0.9779	0.9710; 0.9561
Actuated shift elements (Note: Permanently coupled elements: C_{1}, C_{2}, and R_{3}; S_{3} and S_{4}; C_{3} and R_{4})
Brake A (Note: Dog brake blocks S_{3} and S_{4})	❶	❶	❶	❶	❶					
Brake C (Note: Blocks S_{1})			❶				❶		❶	
Brake D (Note: Blocks R_{2})	❶	❶						❶	❶	❶
Clutch B (Note: Couples S_{1} with input (turbine))	❶			❶		❶				❶
Clutch E (Note: Couples C_{3} and R_{4} with input (turbine))					❶	❶	❶	❶	❶	❶
Clutch F (Note: Dog clutch couples R_{1} and S_{2} with input (turbine))		❶	❶	❶	❶	❶	❶	❶		
Geometric ratios: speed conversion
Gear Ratio R & 1 Ordinary (Note: Ordinary noted: For direct determination of the gear ratio) Elementary Noted (Note: Elementary noted: Alternative representation for determining the transmission ratio; Contains only operands; With ordinary fractions of both central gears of a planetary gearset; Or with the value 1; As a basis; For reliable; And traceable; Determination of the torque conversion rate and efficiency)	$i_R = \frac{(S_1 S_2- R_1 R_2) (S_3+ R_3) (S_4+ R_4)} {S_1 S_2 R_3 R_4}$					$i_1 = \frac{(S_2+ R_2) (S_3+ R_3) (S_4+ R_4)} {S_2 R_3 R_4}$				
Gear Ratio R & 1 Ordinary Elementary Noted	$i_R =\left( 1- \tfrac{R_1 R_2} {S_1 S_2} \right) \left( 1+ \tfrac{S_3} {R_3} \right) \left(1 + \tfrac{S_4} {R_4} \right)$					$i_1 = \left( 1+ \tfrac{R_2} {S_2} \right) \left( 1+ \tfrac{S_3} {R_3} \right) \left( 1+ \tfrac{S_4} {R_4} \right)$				
Gear Ratio 2 & 3 Ordinary Elementary Noted	$i_2 = \frac{(S_1+ R_1) (S_3+ R_3) (S_4+ R_4)} {R_1 R_3 R_4}$					$i_3 = \frac{(S_3+ R_3) (S_4+ R_4)} {R_3 R_4}$				
Gear Ratio 2 & 3 Ordinary Elementary Noted	$i_2 = \left( 1+ \tfrac{S_1} {R_1} \right) \left( 1+ \tfrac{S_3} {R_3} \right) \left( 1+ \tfrac{S_4} {R_4} \right)$					$i_3 = \left( 1+ \tfrac{S_3} {R_3} \right) \left( 1+ \tfrac{S_4} {R_4} \right)$				
Gear Ratio 5–7 Ordinary Elementary Noted	$i_5 = \frac{1} {1}$	$i_6 = \frac{S_3 (S_1+ R_1) (S_4+ R_4)} {S_3 (S_1+ R_1) (S_4+ R_4)+ S_1 R_3 S_4}$					$i_7 = \frac{S_3 (S_2+ R_2) (S_4+ R_4)} {S_3 (S_2+ R_2) (S_4+ R_4)+ R_2 R_3 S_4}$			
Gear Ratio 5–7 Ordinary Elementary Noted	$i_5 = \frac{1} {1}$	$i_6 = \tfrac{1} {1+ \tfrac{\tfrac{R_3} {S_3}} { \left( 1+ \tfrac{R_1} {S_1} \right) \left(1+ \tfrac{R_4} {S_4} \right)}}$					$i_7 = \tfrac{1} {1+ \tfrac{\tfrac{R_3} {S_3}} { \left( 1+ \tfrac{S_2} {R_2} \right) \left( 1+ \tfrac{R_4} {S_4} \right)}}$			
Gear Ratio 4 & 8 & 9 Ordinary Elementary Noted	$i_4 = \frac{S_4+ R_4} {R_4}$		$i_8 = \frac{S_3 (S_4+ R_4)} {S_4 (S_3+ R_3)+ S_3 R_4}$			$i_9 = \frac{S_3 (R_1 R_2- S_1 S_2) (S4+ R_4)} {S_3 (R_1 R_2- S_1 S_2) (S_4+ R_4)+ R_1 R_2 R_3 S_4}$				
Gear Ratio 4 & 8 & 9 Ordinary Elementary Noted	$i_4 = 1+ \tfrac{S_4} {R_4}$		$i_8 = \tfrac{1} {1+ \tfrac{\tfrac{R_3} {S_3}} {1+ \tfrac{R_4} {S_4}}}$			$i_9 = \tfrac{1} {1+ \tfrac{\tfrac{R_3} {S_3}} { \left( 1- \tfrac{S_1 S_2} {R_1 R_2} \right) \left( 1+ \tfrac{R_4} {S_4} \right)}}$				
Kinetic ratios: torque conversion
Torque Ratio R & 1	$\mu_R = \left(1 - \tfrac{R_1 R_2} {S_1 S_2} {\eta_0}^2 \right) \left( 1+ \tfrac{S_3} {R_3} \eta_0 \right) \left( 1+ \tfrac{S_4} {R_4} \eta_0 \right)$					$\mu_1 = \left( 1+ \tfrac{R_2} {S_2} \eta_0 \right) \left( 1+ \tfrac{S_3} {R_3} \eta_0 \right) \left( 1+ \tfrac{S_4} {R_4} \eta_0 \right)$				
Torque Ratio 2 & 3	$\mu_2 = \left( 1+ \tfrac{S_1} {R_1} \eta_0 \right) \left( 1+ \tfrac{S_3} {R_3} \eta_0 \right) \left( 1+ \tfrac{S_4} {R_4} \eta_0 \right)$					$\mu_3 = \left( 1+ \tfrac{S_3} {R_3} \eta_0 \right) \left( 1+ \tfrac{S_4} {R_4} \eta_0 \right)$				
Torque Ratio 5–7	$\mu_5 = \tfrac{1} {1}$	$\mu_6 = \tfrac{1} {1+ \tfrac{\tfrac{R_3} {S_3} \cdot \tfrac{1} {\eta_0}} {\left( 1+ \tfrac{R_1} {S_1} \eta_0 \right) \left( 1+ \tfrac{R_4} {S_4} \eta_0 \right)}}$					$\mu_7 = \tfrac{1} {1+ \tfrac{\tfrac{R_3} {S_3} \cdot \tfrac{1} {\eta_0}} {\left( 1+ \tfrac{S_2} {R_2} \eta_0 \right) \left( 1+ \tfrac{R_4} {S_4} \eta_0 \right)}}$			
Torque Ratio 4 & 8 & 9	$\mu_4 = 1+ \tfrac{S_4} {R_4} \eta_0$		$\mu_8 = \tfrac{1} {1+ \tfrac{\tfrac{R_3} {S_3} \cdot \tfrac{1} {\eta_0}} {1+ \tfrac{R_4} {S_4} \eta_0}}$			$\mu_9 = \tfrac{1} {1+ \tfrac{\tfrac{R_3} {S_3} \cdot \tfrac{1} {\eta_0}} {\left( 1- \tfrac{S_1 S_2} {R_1 R_2} \cdot \tfrac{1} {{\eta_0}^2} \right) \left( 1+ \tfrac{R_4} {S_4} \eta_0 \right)}}$				

=== How it works ===
An animated drive line schematic & a rotational speeds nomogram

These ordinates are positioned on the abscissa in strict accordance with the proportions of the sun gears' teeth numbers relative to those of their rings. Consequently, the output ratios on the ordinate C_{4} (carrier of planetary gearset 4) follows closely to those of the actual transmission. Note that elements A and F are labelled swapped (cf. legend below).

=== Nomogram ===
Concentric Planetary gearset - Simpson Planetary gearset

▶️ Interactive nomogram

This interactive nomogram is a real geometric calculator exactly representing the rotational speeds of the transmission's 3x4 = 12 internal shafts for each of its 9 ratios (+ reverse), grouped according to their 5 permanent coupling on 4 joint ordinates and 3 independent ordinates. These ordinates are positioned on the abscissa in strict accordance with the proportions of the sun gears' teeth numbers relative to those of their rings. Consequently, the output ratios on the 6th ordinate (carrier of the fourth planetary gearset) follows closely those of the actual transmission. This advantageous geometric construction sets us free from Robert Willis' famous and tedious formula, because all calculations are exclusively determined by lengths ratios, respectively teeth numbers on the abscissa for the 4 epicyclic ratios, and of rotational speeds on the 6th ordinate for the 10 gear ratios.

=== Legend ===
A: Dog brake (blocks S_{3} and S_{4})
C: Brake (blocks S_{1})
D: Brake (blocks R_{2})
B: Clutch (couples S_{1} with input shaft)
E: Clutch (couples C_{3} and R_{4} with input shaft)
F: Dog clutch (couples R_{1} and S_{2} with input shaft)

== Technical imperfections ==
The transmission has been problematic, as customers of Jeep, Chrysler, and Acura models equipped with the transmission have experienced problems in their vehicles regarding slow shifting and noisy operation. ZF has said this is due to software problems, not mechanical issues.

Chrysler issued Technical Service Bulletins (TSB) for the 2014 Jeep Cherokee to "fix rough and delayed gearshifts", and Acura has issued transmission-related recalls for the 2015 Acura TLX.

== Applications ==
Variants and applications
Make	Car Model (Note: w/o any claim of completeness)
Acura	TLX (2015–2020, V6 models); MDX (2016–2020, non-hybrid models)
Alfa Romeo	Tonale 2.0L turbo engine
Chrysler	200; Pacifica minivan (petrol engine); Voyager
Dodge	Hornet (2023–2025, 2.0L turbo engine)
FIAT	Dobló/RAM Promaster City (2015–2022); 500C; Toro; Ducato (2020–)
MG	MG 7 (2023–)
Opel/Vauxhall	Astra (2020, diesel engine); Insignia (2020, diesel engine)
Honda	CR-V (2015–2022, diesel engine); Pilot (2016–2020 optional, 2021–2022 standard on all trims); Avancier/UR-V (2016–, 2.0L turbo engine); Odyssey (2018–2019 standard, 10-speed automatic optional); Passport (2019–2025); Ridgeline (2020–); Civic (2018–2022, diesel engine)
Infiniti	QX60 (2022–)
Jeep	Cherokee (KL); Renegade; Compass (MP); Gran Commander
Ram Trucks	ProMaster City; ProMaster (2022–); Rampage
Land Rover	Range Rover Evoque; Discovery Sport
Jaguar	E-Pace
Nissan	Pathfinder (2022–)

== See also ==
- List of Chrysler transmissions
- List of ZF transmissions
