= GAC Fiat Chrysler =

Automobile manufacturing company, joint venture of GAC and Stellantis

GAC Fiat Chrysler Automobiles Co., Ltd.
- Native name: 广汽菲亚特克莱斯勒汽车有限公司
- Formerly: GAC Fiat Automobiles Co., Ltd.
- Company type: Joint venture
- Industry: Automotive
- Founded: March 9, 2010
- Defunct: January 2022
- Fate: Bankrupt
- Headquarters: Changsha, China
- Area served: China
- Key people: Zheng Xiancong (president); Jack Cheng (managing director)
- Products: Automobiles
- Owners: GAC Group (50%); Stellantis (50%)
- Website: gacfiatauto.com - (archived)

GAC Fiat Chrysler
- Simplified Chinese: 广汽菲亚特克莱斯勒
- Traditional Chinese: 廣汽菲亞特克萊斯勒
Transcriptions
Standard Mandarin
- Hanyu Pinyin: Guǎngqì Fēiyàtè Kèláisīlēi
- Wade–Giles: Kuang^{3}-ch'i^{4} Fei^{1}-ya^{4}-t'e^{4} K'ei^{4}-lai^{2}-ssu^{1}-le^{1}
- IPA: [kwàŋtɕʰî féɪjâtʰɤ̂ kʰɤ̂lǎɪsíléɪ]

GAC FCA
- Simplified Chinese: 广汽菲克
- Traditional Chinese: 廣汽菲克
Transcriptions
Standard Mandarin
- Hanyu Pinyin: Guǎngqì Fēikè
- IPA: [kwàŋtɕʰî féɪkʰɤ̂]

GAC Fiat Chrysler Automobiles Co., Ltd. was an automobile manufacturing company headquartered in Changsha, China. It was a 50:50 joint-venture between the GAC Group and Stellantis. The company was founded on 9 March 2010. Fiat agreed to invest an initial US$559 million in the venture.

== History ==
Fiat and GAC signed a joint venture agreement in Rome on 6 July 2009, in the presence of Chinese President Hu Jintao and Italian Prime Minister Silvio Berlusconi. Construction of GAC Fiat facilities in Changsha began on 26 November 2009, with a groundbreaking ceremony attended by the Italian ambassador to China, the provincial leaders of Hunan and Guangdong, and city leaders of Changsha and Guangzhou. GAC Fiat Automobiles Co., Ltd. was incorporated on 9 March 2010.

The Changsha assembly plant was officially opened on 28 June 2012, in a ceremony attended by Fiat chief executive Sergio Marchionne and representatives of Hunan and Guandong provinces.

In January 2013, it was announced that GAC Fiat would be also expanded to include Chrysler, and that, GAC Fiat would construct a new assembly plant in Guangzhou for the production of Jeep products.

In January 2015, GAC Fiat was renamed as GAC Fiat Chrysler.

In January 2022, Stellantis announced a plan to take a 75% majority stake of the joint venture. GAC quickly responded that no formal agreement to change the joint venture had been signed. In July, Stellantis announced that due to a lack of progress in its attempt to take a greater stake in the company, it was terminating the joint venture with GAC. Stellantis planned to shut down local production operations and move towards importing Jeep vehicles to the Chinese market. Later that year, the joint venture filed for bankruptcy.

== Operations ==
GAC Fiat had facilities in Changsha, with an annual production capacity of 140,000 cars and 220,000 engines, covering around 700,000 m^{2}. Vehicle production began in June 2012, with the Fiat Viaggio four-door sedan. Later, the company started to manufacture the Ottimo (the hatchback version of the Viaggio). In October 2013, GAC Fiat announced the construction of a second manufacturing plant in Guangzhou. In November 2014, Fiat Chrysler and GAC expanded their partnership to produce Jeep vehicles. The Changsha plant began assembling the Jeep Cherokee in October 2015 and the Guangzhou plant began assembling the Jeep Renegade in April 2016. In late 2016, the Guangzhou plant began assembling the Jeep Compass. In 2018, the Changsha plant began manufacturing the Jeep Grand Commander.

== Former production ==
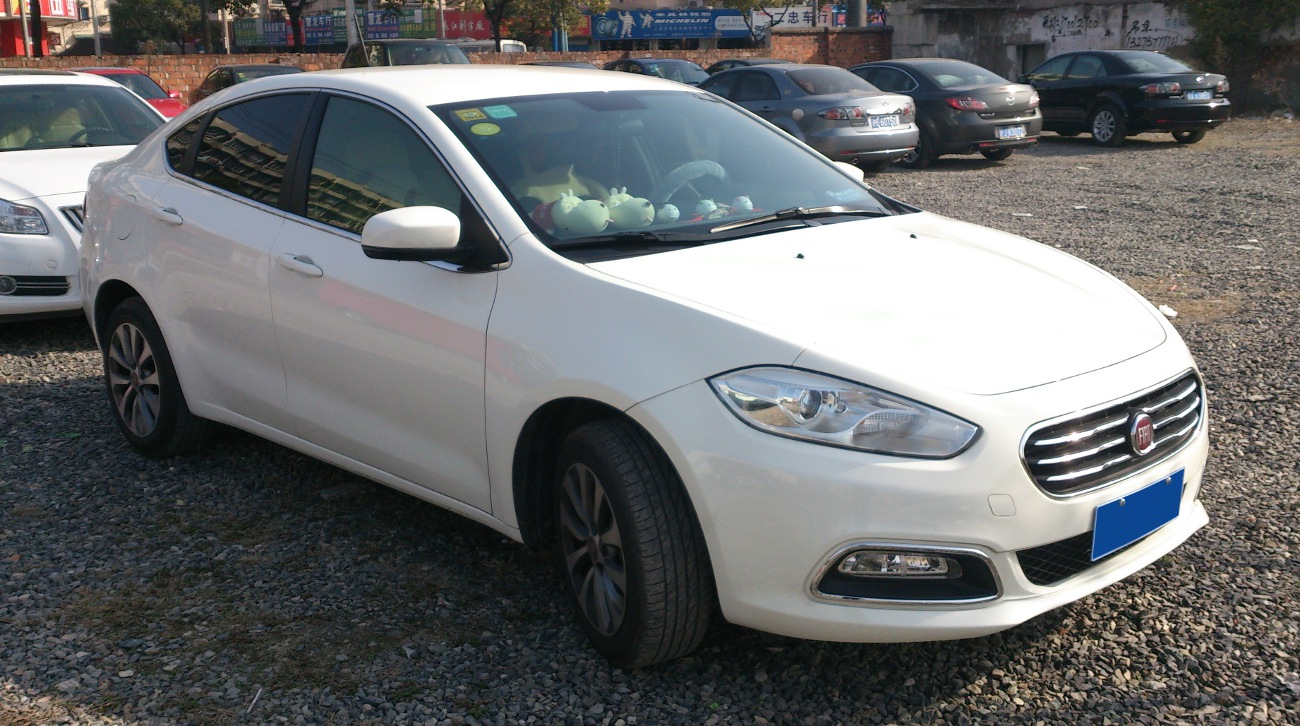
2012–2017
菲亚特菲翔
Fiat Viaggio

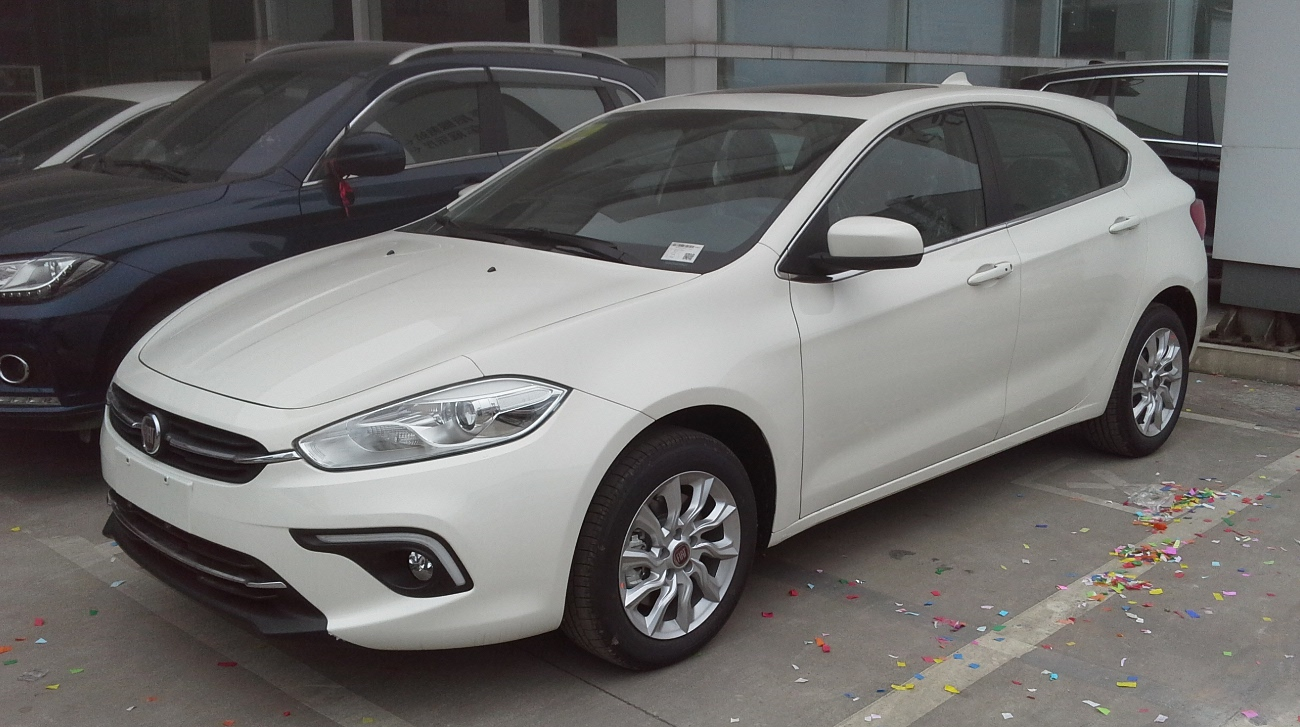
2014–2017
菲亚特致悦
Fiat Ottimo

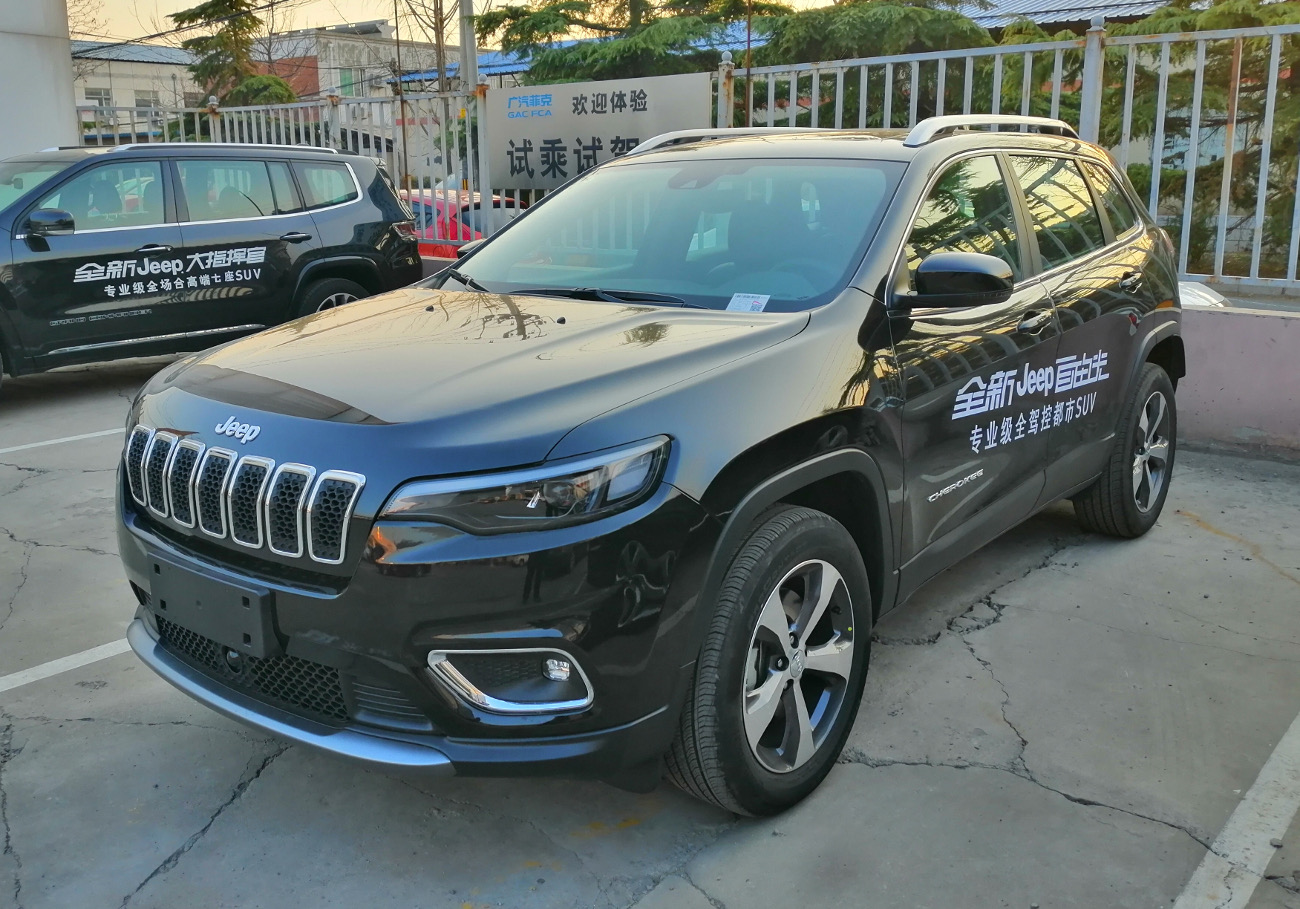
2015–2022
吉普自由光 (K4)
Jeep Cherokee (K4)

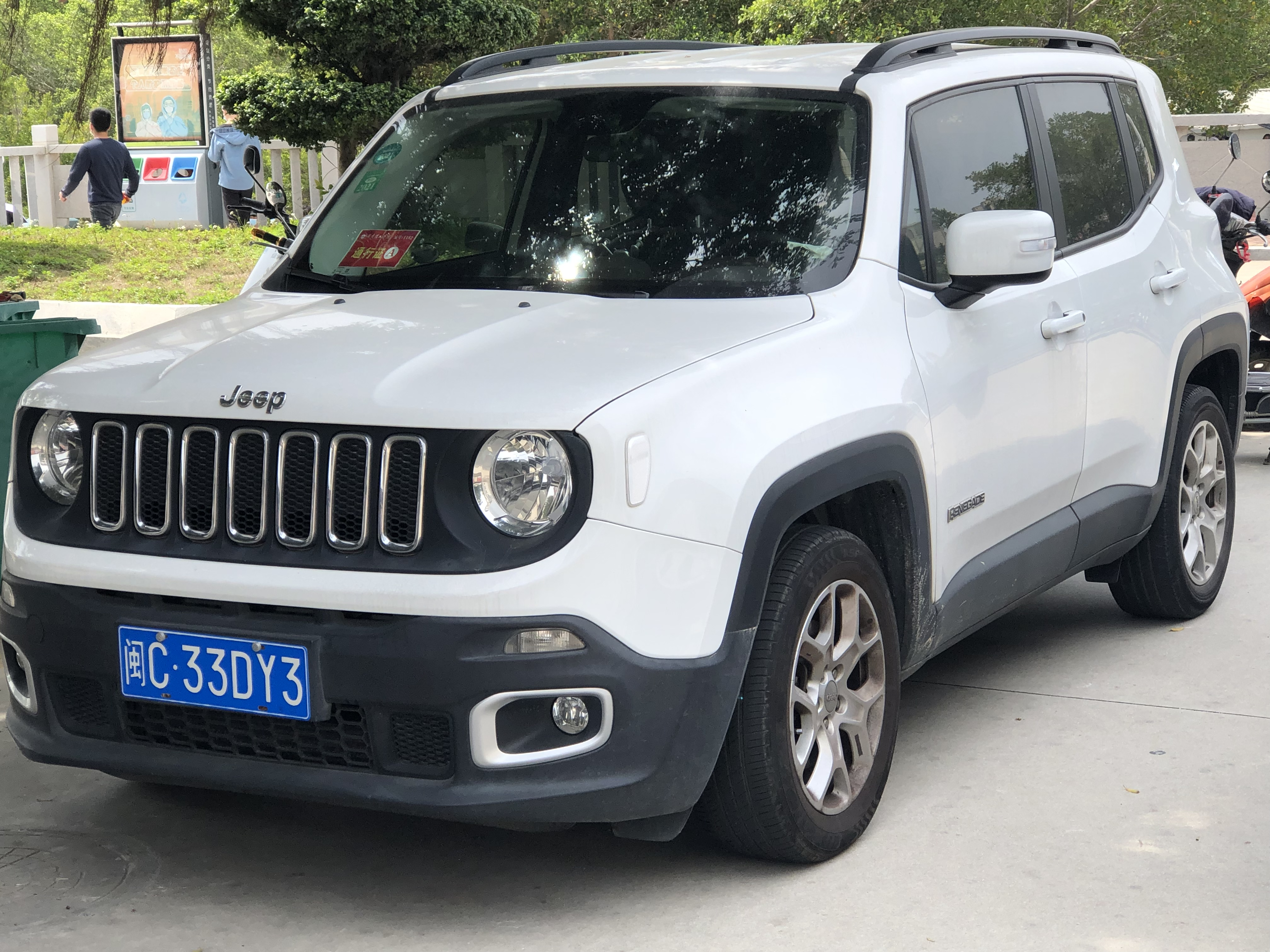
2016–2022
吉普自由侠 (BQ)
Jeep Renegade (BQ)

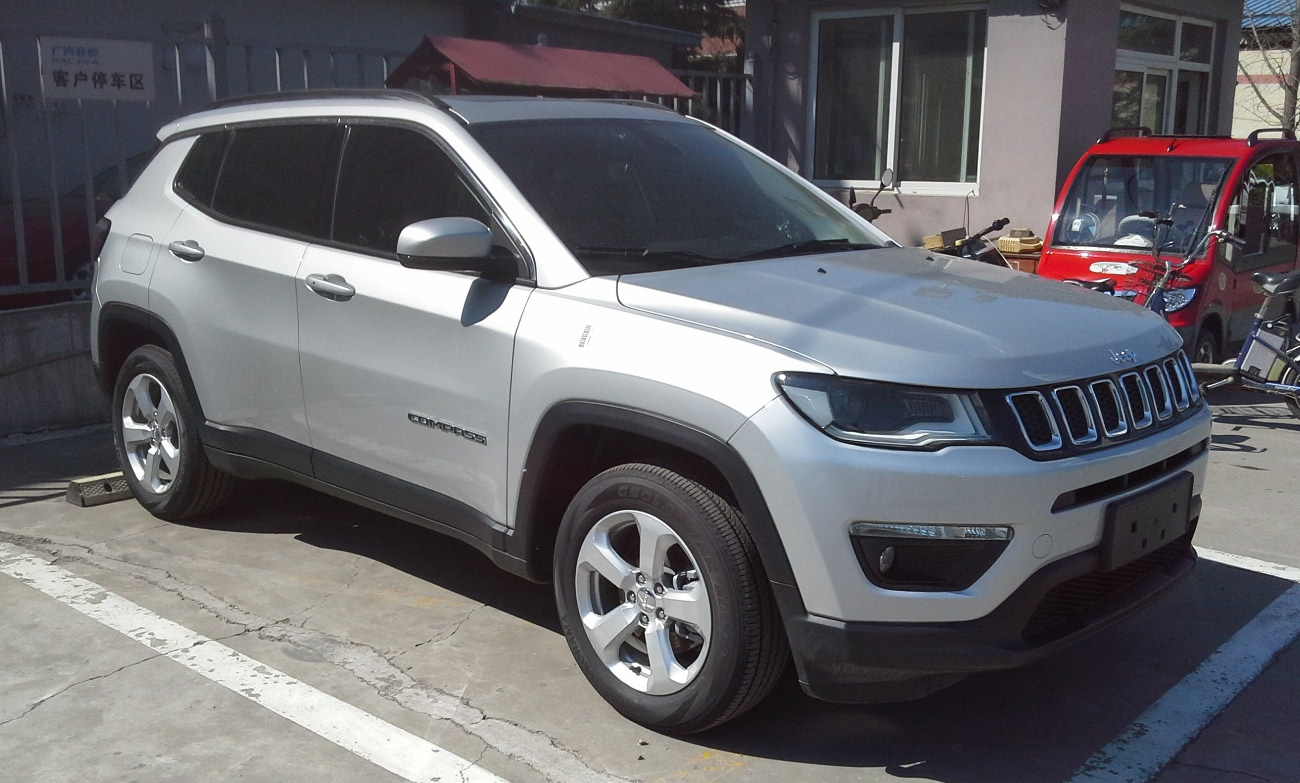
2016–2022
吉普指南者 (M4/553)
Jeep Compass (M4/553)

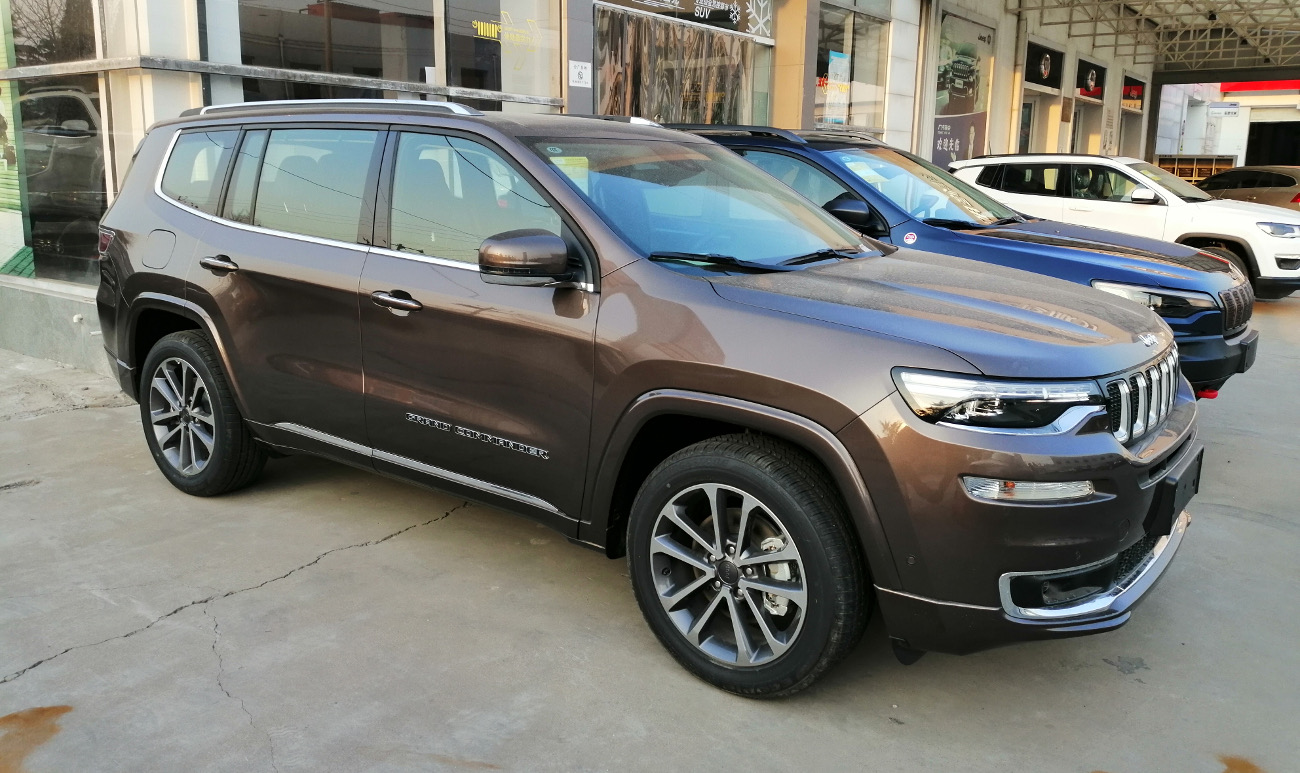
2018–2022
吉普大指挥官 (K8)
Jeep Grand Commander

== Sales figures ==
=== By year ===
Year	Fiat	Jeep	Combined
2012	11,288	0	11,288
2013	48,375	0	48,375
2014	68,090	0	68,090
2015	31,481	8,005	39,486
2016	12,699	133,009	145,708
2017	2,273	202,755	205,028
2018	269	124,514	124,783
2019	23	72,956	72,979
2020	0	40,659	40,659
2021	0	20,357	20,357
Total	174,498	602,255	776,753

=== By model ===
- Fiat Ottimo: 40,002
- Fiat Viaggio: 134,496
- Jeep Cherokee: 253,045
- Jeep Compass: 215,160
- Jeep Grand Commander: 43,039
- Jeep Renegade: 91,011
