= Jeep Grand Commander =

Chinese mid-size SUV

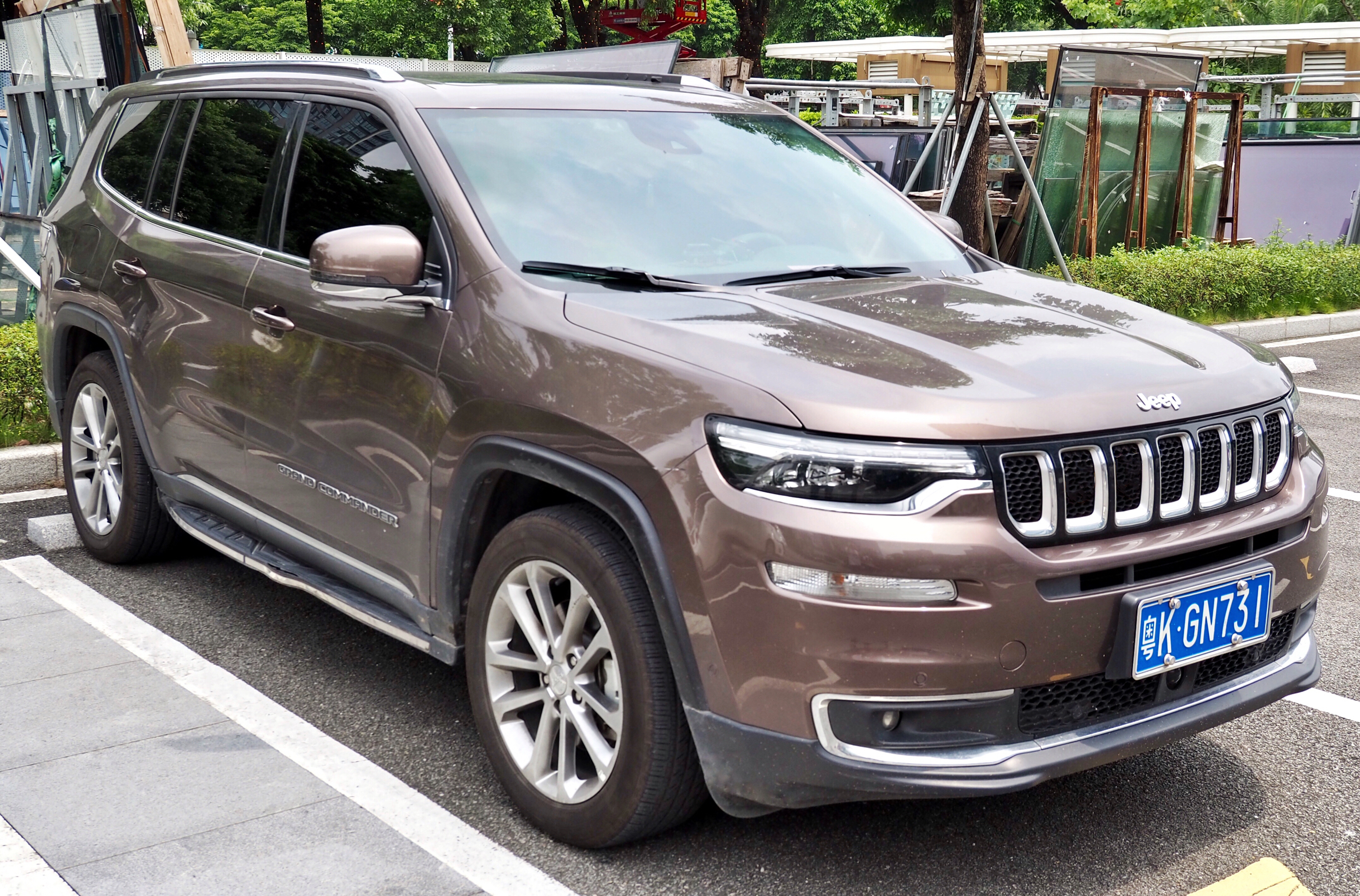

Overview
- Manufacturer: Jeep (Note: FCA US LLC (2018–2021); Stellantis North America (2021–2022))
- Also called: Jeep Commander (2-row, 2018–2020)
- Production: 2018–2022
- Assembly: China: Changsha (GAC FCA)

Body and chassis
- Class: Mid-size crossover SUV
- Body style: 5-door SUV
- Layout: Transverse Front-engine, four-wheel drive
- Platform: FCA Compact Wide
- Related: Jeep Cherokee (KL)

Powertrain
- Engine: 2.0 L GME T4 Hurricane I4-T (gasoline)
- Electric motor: 2x electric motors (SiEVT main motor & generator motor; PHEV)
- Transmission: 9-speed 948TE automatic e-CVT automatic (PHEV)
- Hybrid drivetrain: PHEV (Commander PHEV)
- Battery: 13 kWh Li-ion PHEV Battery Pack

Dimensions
- Wheelbase: 2,800 mm (110.2 in)
- Length: 4,873 mm (191.9 in)
- Width: 1,892 mm (74.5 in)
- Height: 1,738 mm (68.4 in)

Chronology
- Predecessor: Jeep Commander (XK)

The Jeep Grand Commander (project code: K8) is a mid-size crossover SUV with three-row seating manufactured by Jeep through the GAC Fiat Chrysler joint venture in China from 2018 to 2022.

== Overview ==
Previewed by the Yuntu Concept, the Grand Commander debuted in April 2018 at the Beijing Auto Show and was launched on the Chinese car market in May 2018. Manufactured by the GAC Fiat joint venture, the Grand Commander is positioned above the locally made KL Cherokee compact CUV. A 5-seater version is also available as the Commander.

The Grand Commander debuts with a 2.0-liter turbocharged inline-4 engine producing 230 hp (170 kW; 230 PS) and 258 lb⋅ft (350 N⋅m) of torque. The power is sent to either the front wheels or all four wheels via a 9-speed automatic transmission.

Despite its appearance and name, the Grand Commander would not be sold as a successor to the 2006–2010 XK Commander in the North American market, and is unrelated to the Commander produced in Brazil and India.

Following the Stellantis' withdrawal from GAC FCA joint-venture announced later in July 2022, Jeep has phased out its local manufacturing in China. Thus, Grand Commander market presence ceased after 4 years and modest sales.

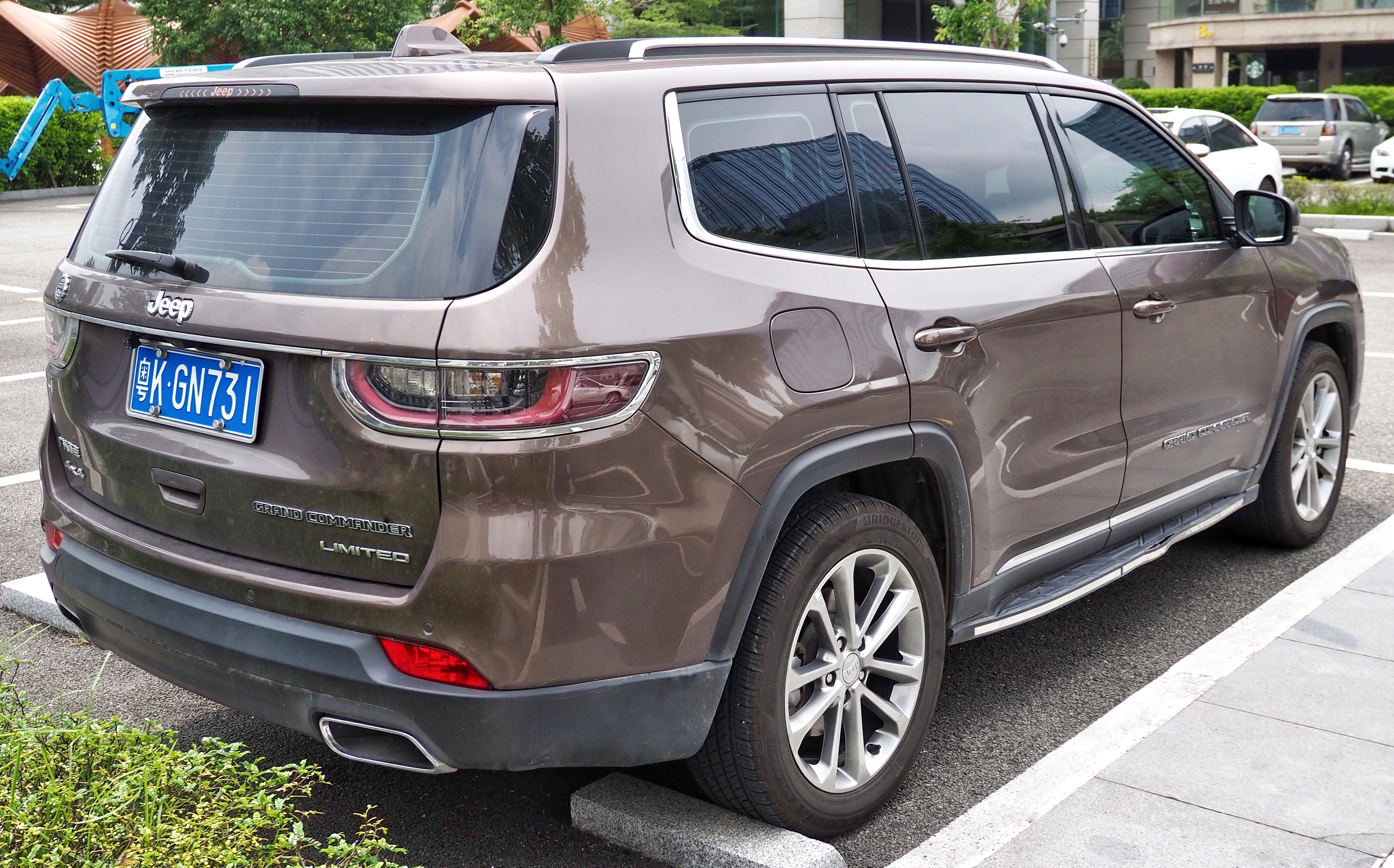
Rear view (Grand Commander)

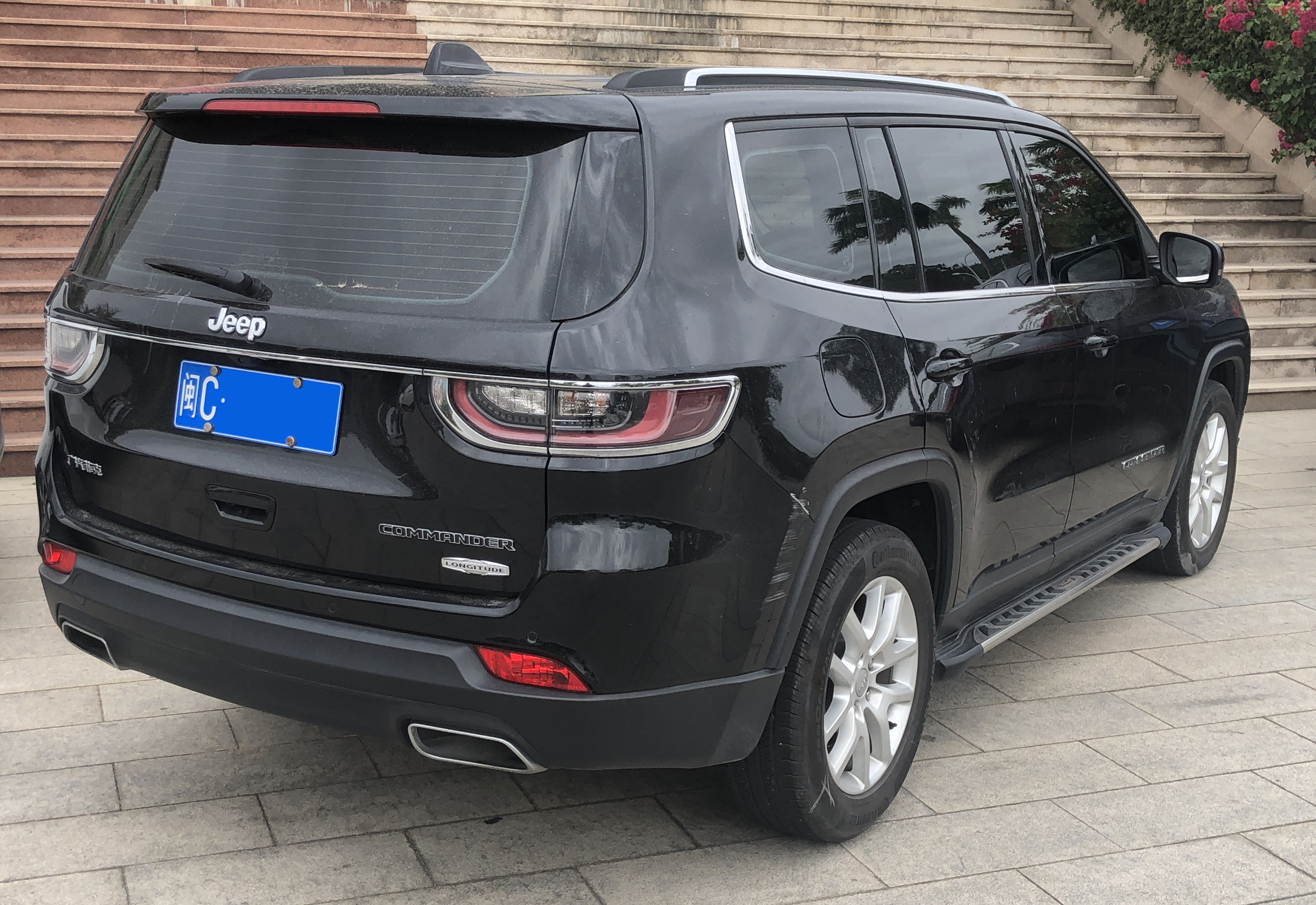
Commander

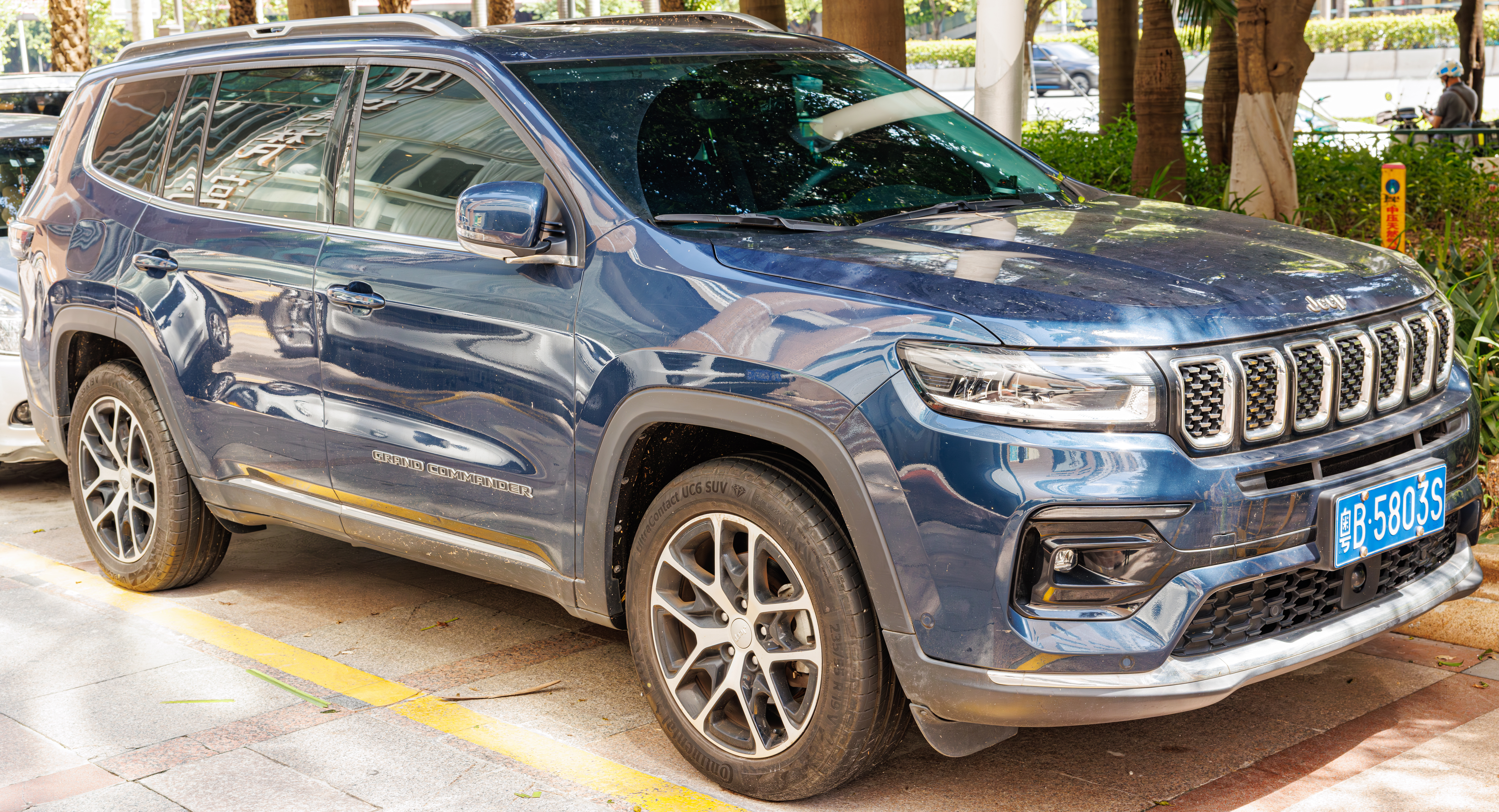
Facelift

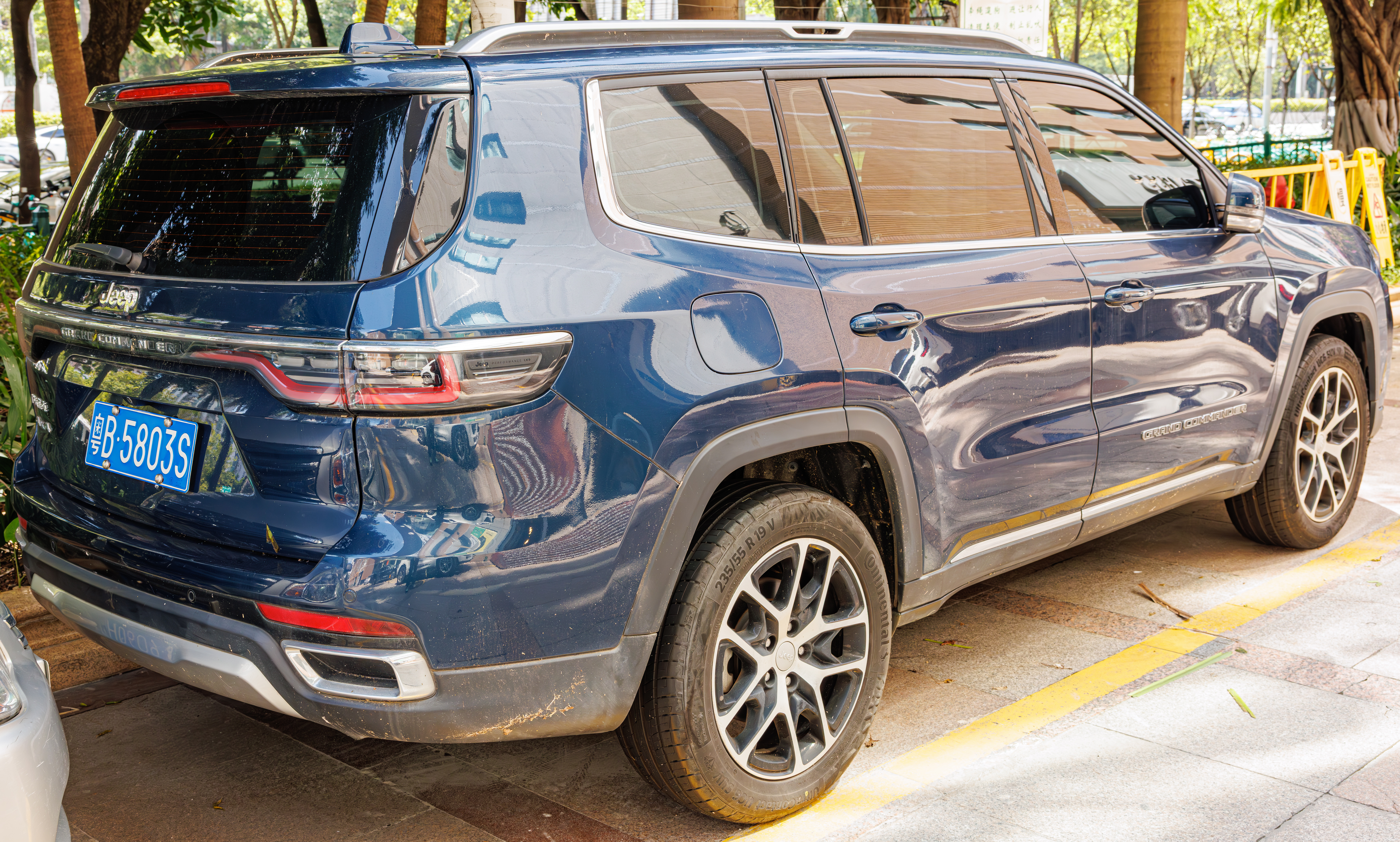
Facelift Rear

== Plug-in hybrid ==
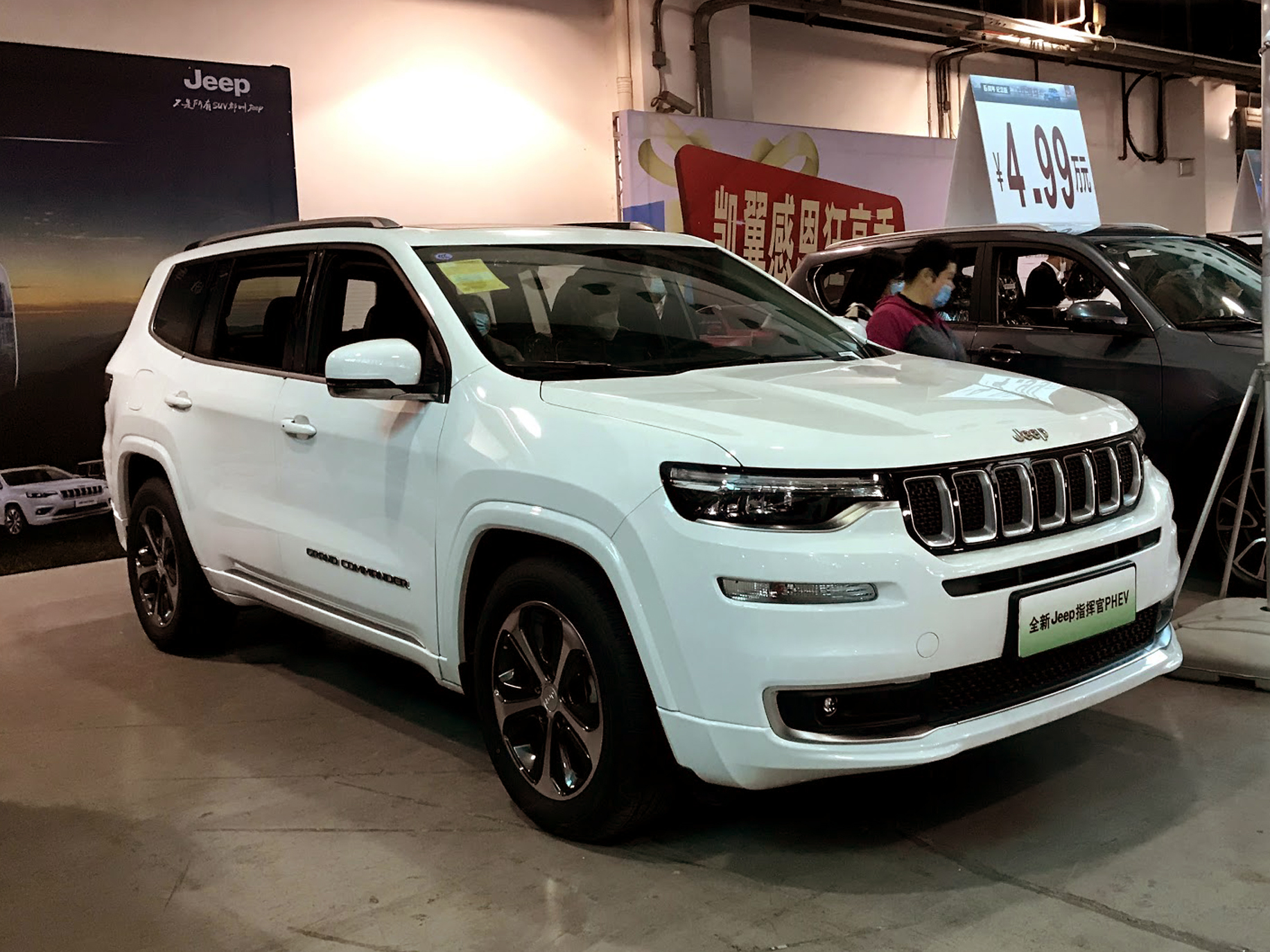
Jeep Grand Commander PHEV

The Commander PHEV is Jeep's first electric vehicle product in China. The Commander PHEV is fitted with Fiat Chrysler's 2.0-liter turbocharged GME-T4 gasoline engine and two electric motors capable of driving the vehicle up to 900 kilometres (559 mi) with fuel economy of 1.6 L/100 km (150 mpg_{‑US}). The plug-in hybrid vehicle features a 13 kWh lithium-ion battery pack stored underneath the floor, and can be fully recharged in two hours using a 220V 30A charging station and the 6.6 kWh on-board charger. 8 hours are needed to fully charge the vehicle using the standard charging equipment that comes with the vehicle. Four E-drive modes, including Hybrid, Electric, E-Save, and Sport, are available, and selection could be done via a rotary switch in the center console. Hybrid mode is the default, while Electric limits top speed to 125 km/h (78 mph) and saves gas for later use. The E-Save mode maintains battery, while Sport mode produces maximum output. According to GAC-FCA, the Commander PHEV has a range of 70 km (43 mi) on one charge when powered by batteries only.

Due to the battery placement, the PHEV is only available as 5 5-seater. In 2020, the name was changed from Commander PHEV to Grand Commander PHEV, and renamed again to Grand Commander e with the 2022 facelift.

== Sales ==
Year	China
2018	13,466
2019	14,293
2020	7,373
2021	7,907
2022	
2023	20
