= Jeep Cherokee (KL) =

Compact crossover SUV

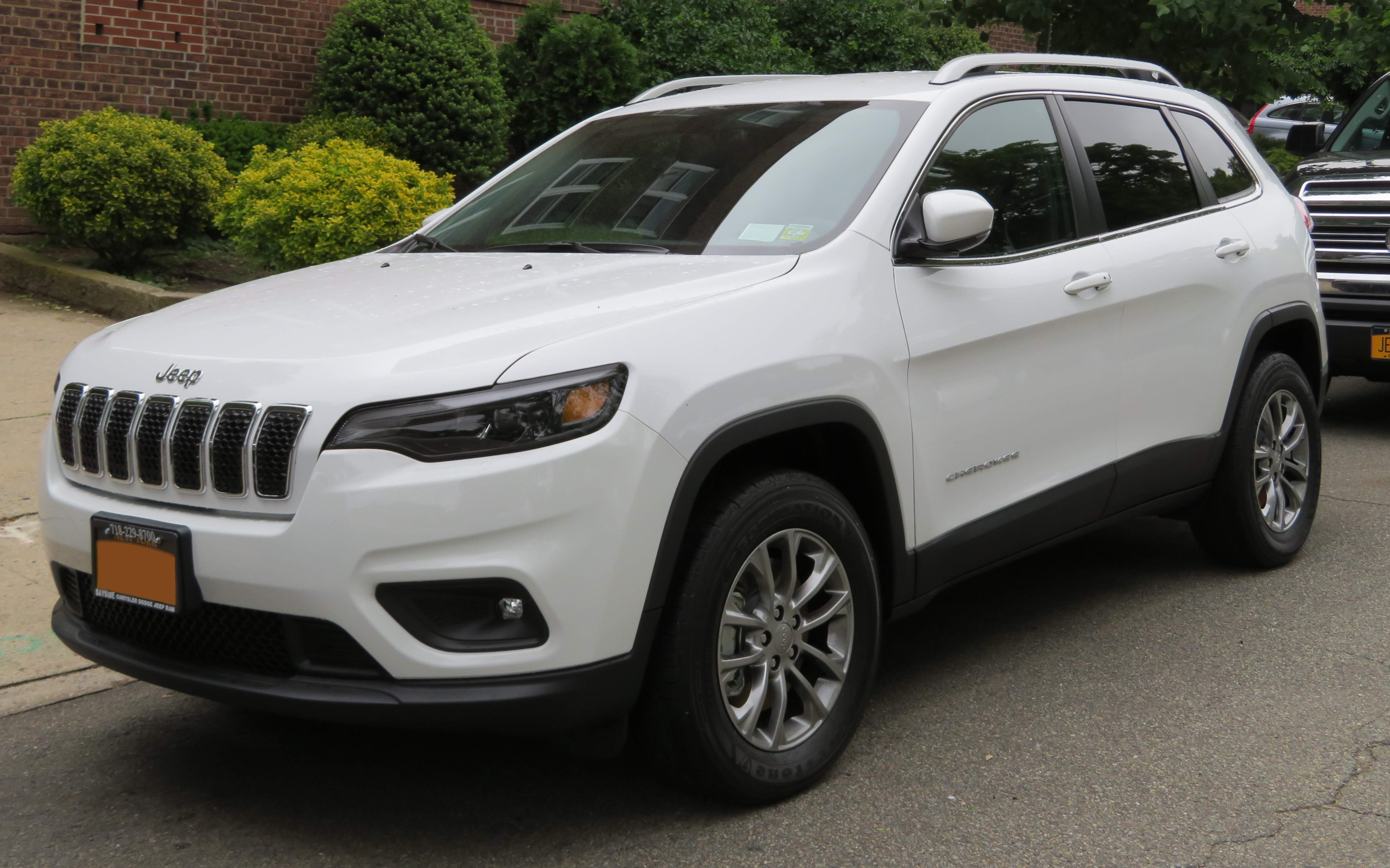
- 2019 Jeep Cherokee Latitude

Overview
- Manufacturer: Jeep (Note: Chrysler Group LLC (2013–2014); FCA US LLC (2014–2021); Stellantis North America (2021–2023))
- Production: 2013 – February 2023
- Model years: 2014–2023
- Assembly: United States: Toledo, Ohio (Toledo Complex: 2013–2017); Belvidere, Illinois (Belvidere Assembly Plant: 2017–2023); China: Changsha, Hunan (GAC Fiat Chrysler: 2015–2022)
- Designer: Greg Howell (2010)

Body and chassis
- Class: Compact crossover SUV
- Body style: 5-door SUV
- Layout: Front-engine, front-wheel drive or four-wheel drive
- Platform: FCA Compact Wide
- Related: Chrysler 200 (2015–2017); Jeep Grand Commander

Powertrain
- Engine: Diesel: 2.0 L FCA/FPT Multijet II common rail (turbo-diesel) I4; 2.2 L Fiat/CNH Multijet II I4 common rail (turbo); Gasoline: 2.0 L GEMA Tigershark I4 (China); 2.0 L Alfa Romeo GME T4 Hurricane I4; 2.4 L GEMA Tigershark I4; 3.2 L Chrysler Pentastar V6
- Transmission: 6-speed manual 9-speed ZF 948TE automatic

Dimensions
- Wheelbase: 106.3 in (2,700 mm)
- Length: 182 in (4,623 mm); 183–183.8 in (4,648–4,669 mm) (China)
- Width: 73.2 in (1,859 mm) (Sport, Latitude, and Limited models) or 74.9 in (1,902 mm) (Trailhawk model only); 73.2–75 in (1,859–1,905 mm) (China)
- Height: 66.2–67.8 in (1,681–1,722 mm); 66.4–68.1 in (1,687–1,730 mm) (China)
- Curb weight: 3,655–4,046 lb (1,658–1,835 kg); 3,670–4,354 lb (1,665–1,975 kg) (China)

Chronology
- Predecessor: Jeep Cherokee/Liberty (KK); Dodge Nitro; Jeep Patriot (Russia)
- Successor: Jeep Cherokee (KM)

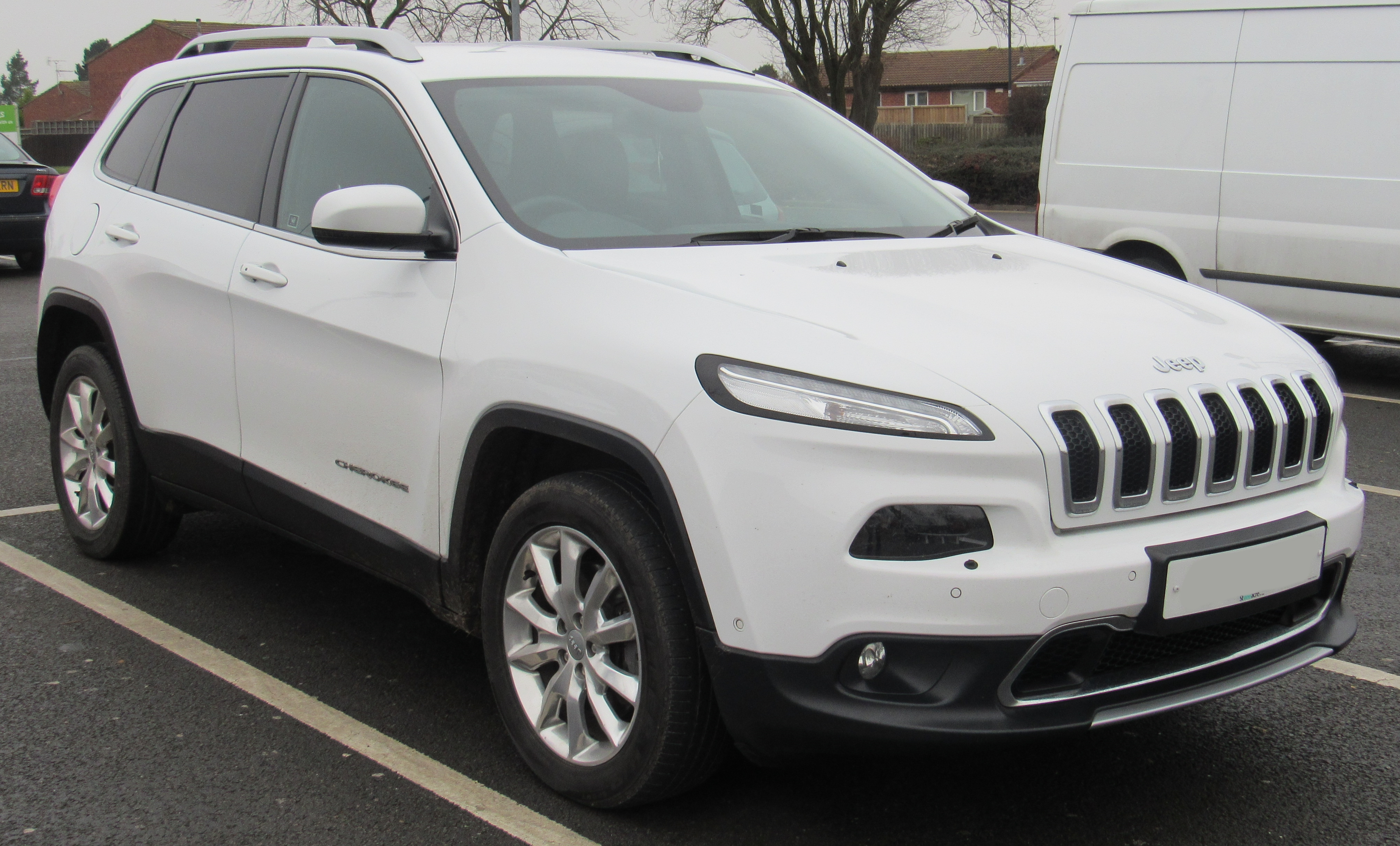
2016 Jeep Cherokee Limited

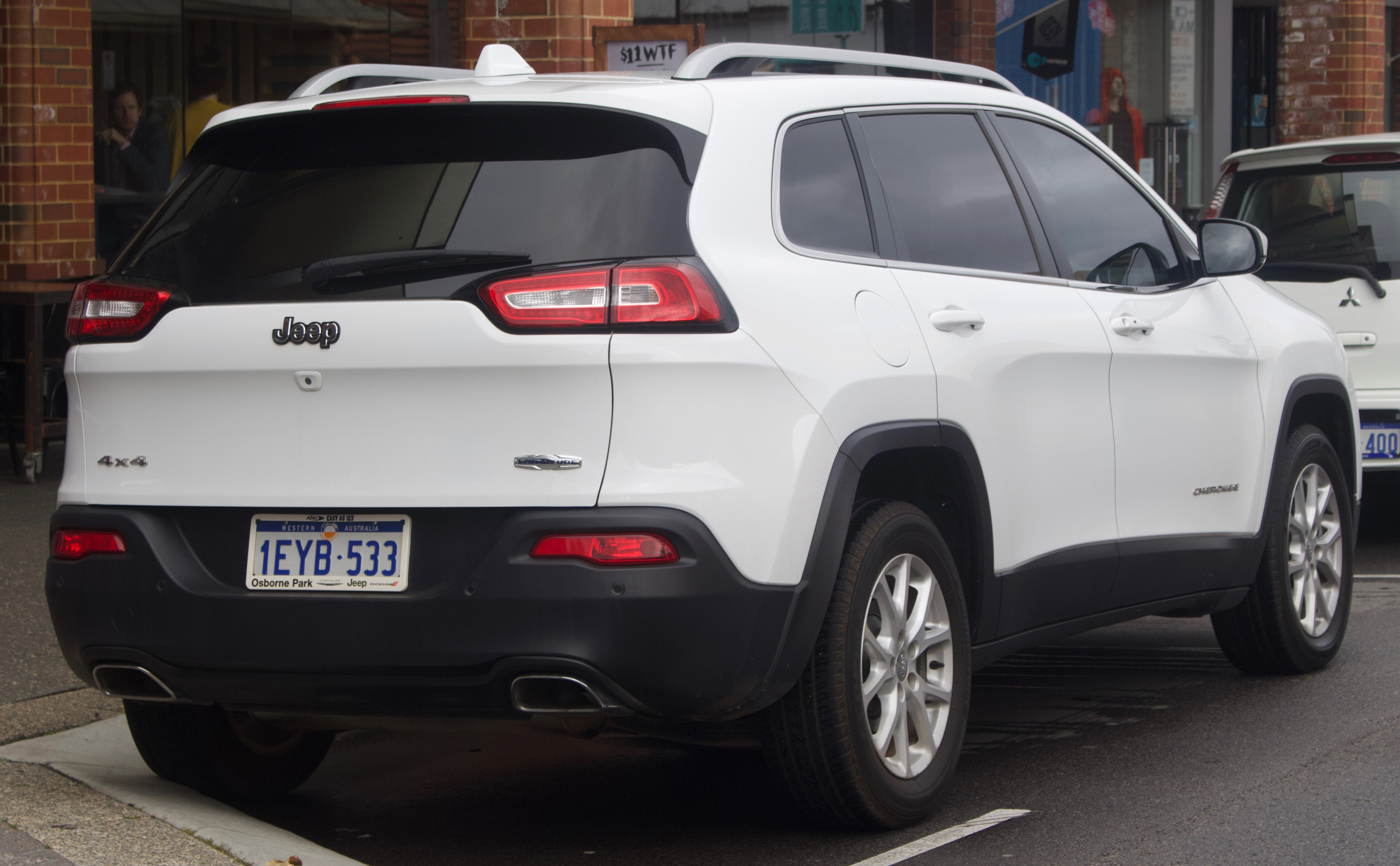
2015 Jeep Cherokee Latitude

The Jeep Cherokee (KL) is a compact crossover SUV that was manufactured and marketed by the Jeep marque of Stellantis North America. Introduced for model year 2014 at the 2013 New York International Auto Show, sales began in November 2013. It occupies a position between the smaller Compass and the larger Grand Cherokee in Jeep's global lineup.

== Overview ==
Jeep previewed the fifth-generation Cherokee in February 2013, shortly after the releasing the Compass, Patriot, and Grand Cherokee. The Cherokee debuted at the New York International Auto Show on March 27, 2013. The North American market saw the Cherokee nameplate for the first time since the 2001 departure of the Cherokee (XJ). Other markets retained the Cherokee name with the introduction of the Liberty in the North American markets.

The Cherokee is the first Jeep vehicle to use the Fiat Compact Wide platform, which was co-developed by Chrysler and Fiat. It features a wheelbase of 106.3 inches (2,700 mm), 1.1 inches (28 mm) longer than the 1993 Jeep Grand Cherokee, 5.1 inches (130 mm) longer than its predecessor, the Jeep Cherokee XJ, and 2.7 inches (69 mm) shorter than the original Jeep Cherokee (SJ).

The Jeep Cherokee could be equipped with three different four-wheel-drive systems: Active Drive I, Active Drive II, and Active Drive Lock. All of these systems came with Jeep's Selec-Terrain traction control system and rear-axle disconnect feature. The rear axle disconnect feature, a first for a compact SUV, disconnects the rear axle when four-wheel-drive is not needed. This lowers parasitic drivetrain load, thereby improving fuel efficiency.

The Cherokee's official size classification is somewhat debated. Jeep officially considers the Cherokee to fit into the mid-size crossover class on account of its large exterior dimensions and engine options. However, due to the Cherokee's comparatively small interior space, it is often grouped with other compact crossovers alongside the Jeep Compass.

== Trim levels ==
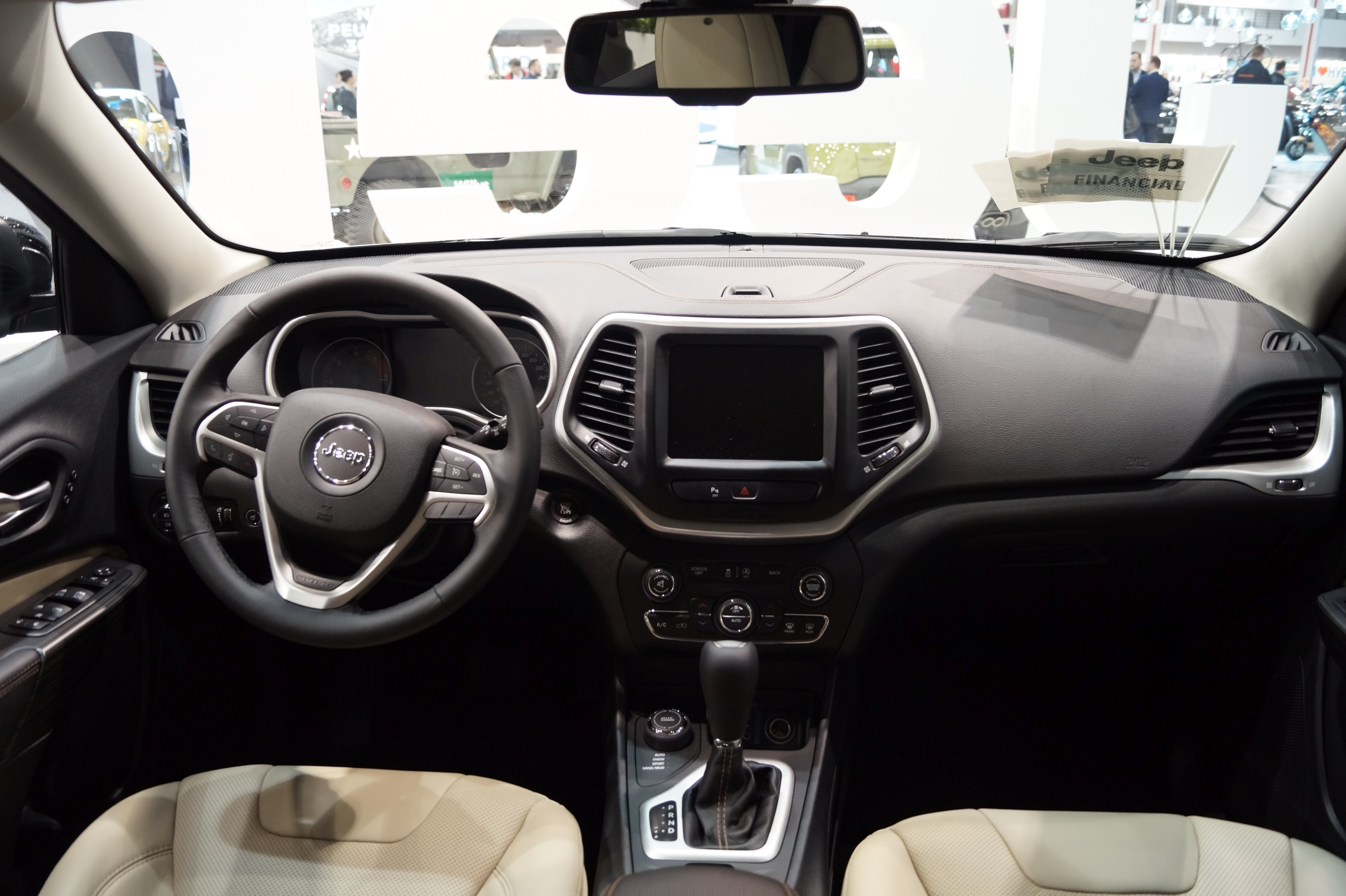
Interior

The Cherokee was available in several trim levels:

=== Sport (2014–2018) ===
The Sport served as the base model between 2014 and 2018. It includes seventeen-inch steel wheels, the Uconnect 5.0 touch screen radio, six speakers, cloth seating surfaces, a 2.4-liter Tigershark I4 engine, and nine-speed ZF automatic transmission. It comes in both 4×2 and 4×4 configurations. In 2015, the 3.2-liter Pentastar V6 also became available on this model. Seventeen-inch alloy wheels are available as part of the Sport Appearance Package. The Sport was replaced with the Latitude starting in 2019.

=== Latitude (2014–2023) ===
The Latitude was Jeep's volume trim of the Cherokee line. It added alloy wheels and body-colored door handles and side view mirrors. It comes in both 4×2 and 4×4. In Canada, the model was dubbed North 4×2 or North 4×4. The Latitude came with the 8.4" Uconnect and premium sound option as standard, whereas on the North, it was an optional upgrade. An Altitude trim, derived from the Latitude, was introduced in spring 2014, which added black alloy wheels and blacked-out accents. The Latitude became the new base model Cherokee in 2019, replacing the Sport, and a new Latitude Plus trim was introduced to take the place of the old Latitude model. For 2021, a new Latitude Lux trim added some of the features found on the Limited trim, such as Nappa luxury leather-trimmed seating surfaces, the Uconnect 4 8.4" touchscreen infotainment system, and dual heated front seats. Base Latitude and Latitude Plus trims were discontinued for the 2022 model year, although the Latitude Lux trim remained available until 2023.

=== X (2022–2023) ===
The X trim became available in 2022. Building off of the base Altitude trim, the X added Trailhawk-inspired exterior styling, combination vinyl-and-cloth-trimmed seating surfaces, dual heated front seats, and a heated leather-wrapped steering wheel.

=== Trailhawk (2014–2022) ===
The Trailhawk added dark-colored alloy wheels, the Uconnect 8.4A touch screen radio with 9-1-1 emergency assistance, roadside assistance, and support for apps. Exclusively available with four-wheel drive, it was a far more off-road capable model, and was marketed as "Trail Rated." As standard, the Trailhawk included recovery hooks for towing a stuck vehicle and the "Active Drive Lock" four-wheel-drive system with a mechanical locking rear differential. Other changes included a unique hood graphic, different bumpers for better approach and departure angles, wider fender flares, offroad skid plates and a full-size spare wheel. Both Trailhawk L and Trailhawk Elite models became available starting in 2017, adding uplevel features to the base Trailhawk model.

=== Limited (2014–2023) ===
The Limited served as the top-of-the-line model, and adds bright-finished alloy wheels, and leather seating surfaces. It came in both 4×2 and 4×4. It also adds the Uconnect Access 8.4A touch-screen infotainment system, heated dual front seats, and Keyless Go with push-button and remote starter systems.

=== Altitude Edition (2015–2021) ===
The Altitude Edition was based on the midlevel Latitude model, and added features to the model such as gloss black eighteen-inch alloy wheels, a black lower front fascia accent, gloss black grille surrounds, gloss black roof rails, gloss black exterior badges, black window surround moldings, and an all-black leather interior. Also included was the Uconnect Access 8.4A radio with an AM/FM stereo, SiriusXM Satellite Radio, iPod and USB input jacks, a 3.5-millimeter auxiliary audio input jack, hands-free calling, 9-1-1 Assist, Wi-Fi connectivity for wireless Internet access in the vehicle, wireless audio streaming, voice command, a full color touch-screen display, optional Garmin GPS navigation, and an optional single-disc player (mounted in the center console). The model became available in 2015, and had a base price of $25,495 MSRP, up only $600 from the parent Latitude model, and was only available in Granite Crystal Metallic, Billet Silver Metallic, Bright White Clear Coat, or Brilliant Black Crystal Pearl Coat Metallic, all of which complement the gloss black exterior accents. The Altitude Edition trim was discontinued following the 2021 model year.

=== Overland (2016–2020) ===
Introduced in 2016, the Cherokee Overland is the top-of-the-line, and most luxurious, Cherokee trim level in the United States. In addition to the previously top-of-the-line Limited trim level, it adds color-keyed front and rear fascias with chrome accents, color-keyed wheel wells, 18-inch polished alloy wheels, Uconnect Access 8.4" infotainment system with navigation, nine-speaker 506-watt Alpine premium sound system, heated and ventilated leather seats, and a leather and wood-trimmed heated steering wheel.

The Overland offered either the 184-horsepower (187 PS; 137 kW) 2.4-liter Tigershark inline four-cylinder engine, or the 271-horsepower (275 PS; 202 kW) 3.2-liter Pentastar V6 engine with a start-stop system, in either two- or four-wheel drive (with Jeep's "Active-Drive II" transfer case).

The Overland trim was discontinued following the 2020 model year, citing slow sales, as well as being similarly equipped to the Limited trim; however, the High Altitude Edition takes the Overland's place at the top of the Cherokee lineup for the 2021 model year.

=== 75th Anniversary (2016) and 80th Anniversary (2021) Editions ===
In addition, a 75th Anniversary Edition model made its debut in spring 2016 to celebrate Jeep's 75th anniversary. Based on the Latitude trim level of the Cherokee, exclusive features included a Recon Green Metallic exterior paint color option, unique 75th Anniversary Edition exterior emblems, bronze-painted exterior accents, bronze-painted eighteen-inch (18") alloy wheels, premium cloth seating surfaces with "Ombre" mesh inserts and 75th Anniversary Edition embroidery, and bronze-accented interior trim. The Uconnect Access 8.4A infotainment system, as well as a full panoramic power moonroof are both standard on this model, as is deep-tinted glass and automatic front head and fog lamps. A similar 80th Anniversary Edition, celebrating Jeep's 80th anniversary, was also available for 2021.

== Production ==
The Cherokee began production in the Toledo Complex plant in the spring of 2013. Jeep pushed back the release date of the Cherokee to allow time for the development of the nine-speed automatic transmission by ZF. The new Cherokee arrived at dealerships in mid-fall 2013.

In late summer 2013, Jeep temporarily ceased production of its all-new Cherokee because of a transmission software issue. A few thousand Cherokees had already been produced, and would remain at the factory until a fix could be issued. In October 2013, a software fix was issued to the Cherokee, resuming production of the vehicle and shipment to dealers in the U.S. By November, the sales had started well in both the U.S. and Canada, with at least four weeks of stock depletion due to pre-order. Chrysler stated on December 11, 2013, that the Cherokee advertisement campaign with the tagline Built Free was the most successful one since the introduction of the 2011 Dodge Charger.

The Cherokee was introduced in Europe in the spring of 2014. To meet the demands of European buyers, the model was fitted with one or more diesel powertrains, most likely one or more versions of the FIAT Multijet engine with a displacement of 2.0-liter and 170 PS (168 hp; 125 kW).

Production in Toledo ended in spring 2017, with 949,151 units having been built there. FCA moved production of the Jeep Cherokee to its Belvidere Assembly facility, where the Jeep Compass and Jeep Patriot, as well as the Dodge Dart (PF) were produced until 2016. The Belvidere Assembly facility did not have to be retooled in order to produce the Cherokee, and the production change took place after the Dart was discontinued following the 2017 model year. FCA invested $700 million into the plant and added 700 jobs to the Toledo North.

The Belvidere Assembly Plant ceased production of the Cherokee on February 28, 2023.

== Powertrain ==
The Cherokee featured Chrysler's 2.4-liter Tigershark I4 engine that produced a maximum output of 187 PS (138 kW; 184 hp) and 232 N⋅m (171 lb⋅ft; 24 kg⋅m) of torque. The most efficient model had a highway fuel economy rating of 31 mpg_{‑US} (7.6 L/100 km; 37 mpg_{‑imp}), which was 45% better than the Liberty/Cherokee it replaced, and a driving range of 495 miles (797 km).

Optional for the Cherokee was Chrysler's new 3.2 L Pentastar V6 engine. It achieved 29 mpg_{‑US} (8.1 L/100 km; 35 mpg_{‑imp}) and produced up to 275 PS (202 kW; 271 hp) and 324 N⋅m (239 lb⋅ft; 33 kg⋅m) of torque. The Cherokee was Chrysler's first product to feature the all-new engine.

In select markets, FCA offered an all-new 2.2-liter Multijet II common rail direct injection turbodiesel with 185 PS (136 kW; 182 hp) or 200 PS (147 kW; 197 hp) and 440 N⋅m (325 lb⋅ft; 45 kg⋅m) of torque, achieving fuel economy of 49.6 mpg_{‑imp} (5.70 L/100 km; 41.3 mpg_{‑US}) combined.

Cherokees for sale in the United States featured Chrysler's new nine-speed automatic transmission, designed by ZF and manufactured by Chrysler. Cherokees for sale in Europe may feature a 6-speed manual transmission. Not only was the Cherokee the first Chrysler vehicle to feature a nine-speed transmission, it was also the first sport utility vehicle to feature a nine-speed transmission. The transmission yields approximately two additional miles per gallon with the V6 engine option compared to a six speed automatic.

New for the 2019 model year was the 2.0-liter "Hurricane" turbo inline-4 (I4) gasoline engine. It delivered 270 horsepower (274 PS; 201 kW) at 5,200 rpm and 295 lb⋅ft (400 N⋅m; 41 kg⋅m) of torque between 3,000 and 4,500 rpm with the help of direct fuel injection.

Front-wheel-drive and four-wheel-drive models are available, with Jeep's Selec-Terrain system being available on the latter. These are named differently depending on the markets, with the FWD being slightly less expensive.

For the 2022 model year, the 2.4-liter "Tigershark" four-cylinder engine was discontinued, and the 3.2-liter Pentastar VVT V6 engine became standard equipment on all Cherokee models. The 2.0L "Hurricane" turbo four-cylinder engine remained an option on most models. For 2023, the 2.4-liter powered the Altitude Lux, while the 2.0-liter turbo I4 powered the Trailhawk trim.

== Transmission issues ==
The Cherokee was the first vehicle to market to use ZF's new 9-speed automatic transaxle. It featured an unconventional design that reduced its size and increased fuel economy over more conventional transmissions, but increased its complexity. The initial release of the Cherokee was delayed by several weeks citing quality concerns with the transmission, and multiple reports of issues with shift quality and reliability surfaced shortly after launch. Both 2014 and 2015 Cherokees have a high number of consumer complaints on safecar.gov and carcomplaints.com compared to similar models of its class, with the vast majority of complaints being related to the transmission. FCA's chief quality officer was forced to leave shortly after a poor Consumer Reports review on the dependability of models including the Cherokee, and so far, Chrysler has released three software updates for the 2014–2015 Cherokee transmission. The company has continued to assert that the problem is software-related. However, Chrysler has been repairing some Cherokee models' transmission "snap ring" to address durability concerns. Multiple vehicles that use the same ZF model transmission, such as the Range Rover Evoque, Honda Pilot, Acura TLX, Chrysler 200, and even the similarly built Jeep Renegade have had issues of varying severity as well. ZF, the transmission's designer, has also insisted that the issue is with software, and would not comment on any improvements being made. As of August 2016, ZF had issued a recall regarding the 9-speed automatic transmission affecting 505,000 vehicles. ZF has been quoted for suggesting that the issues were related to a faulty control sensor could cause the transmission to randomly drop into neutral while driving.

These transmission issues delayed the release of the all-new 2014 Jeep Cherokee KL to consumers until late summer 2014.

== Software hack ==
In July 2015, FCA issued a recall of 1.4 million vehicles after a software glitch was discovered which would allow hackers to wirelessly hijack vehicles and electronically control vital functions. IT security researchers Charlie Miller and Chris Valasek hacked a 2014 Jeep Cherokee and gained access to the car over the Internet, which allowed them to control the vehicle's radio, A/C, and windshield wipers, as well as the Cherokee's steering, brakes and transmission. Chrysler published a patch that car owners could download and install via a USB stick, or have a car dealer install for them.

The software glitch impacted the 2014–2015 Jeep Cherokee, as well as the 2015 Chrysler 200, Chrysler 300, Dodge Charger, Dodge Challenger, 2013–2014 SRT and Dodge Viper, 2014–2015 Jeep Grand Cherokee (WK2), and 2013–2015 Ram Truck 1500 through 5500. All vehicles were equipped with either the Uconnect 3C 8.4A (RA3) or the Uconnect 3C 8.4AN (RA4) infotainment systems, which featured Uconnect Access, and used a Sprint 3G CDMA wireless connection in the vehicle to access services and apps. Vehicles equipped with the Uconnect 2 3.0/3.0BT (RA1), Uconnect 3 5.0BT (RA2), and Uconnect 6.5A (RA4) were unaffected by the software glitch, as those radios did not feature a built-in wireless connection. Vehicles equipped with the older Uconnect 3 8.4A (RE2) and Uconnect 8.4N (RB5) infotainment systems were also unaffected for the same reason.

== Facelift ==
The restyled 2019 Jeep Cherokee KL made its debut at the 2018 North American International Auto Show in Detroit, Michigan, on January 16, 2018.

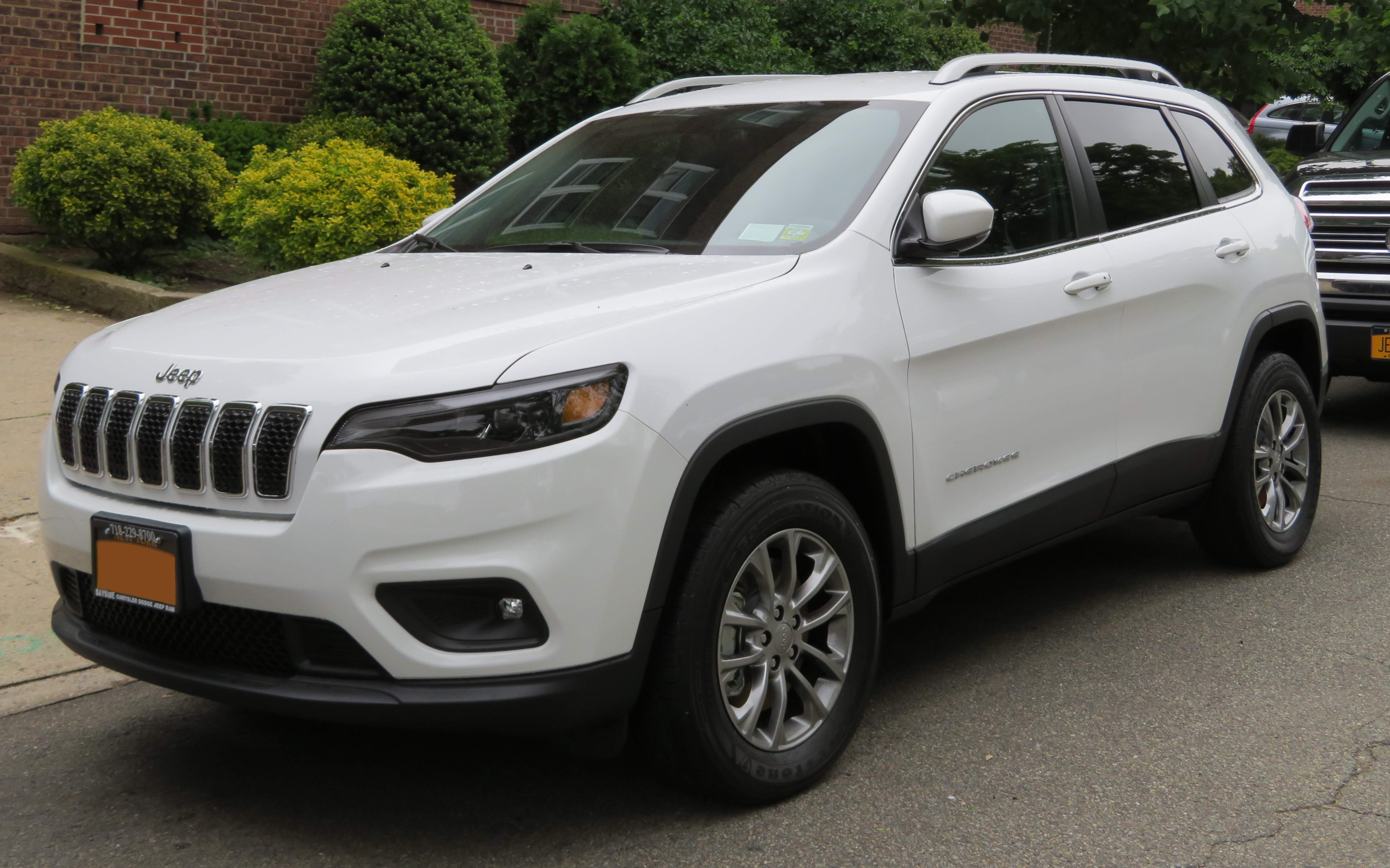

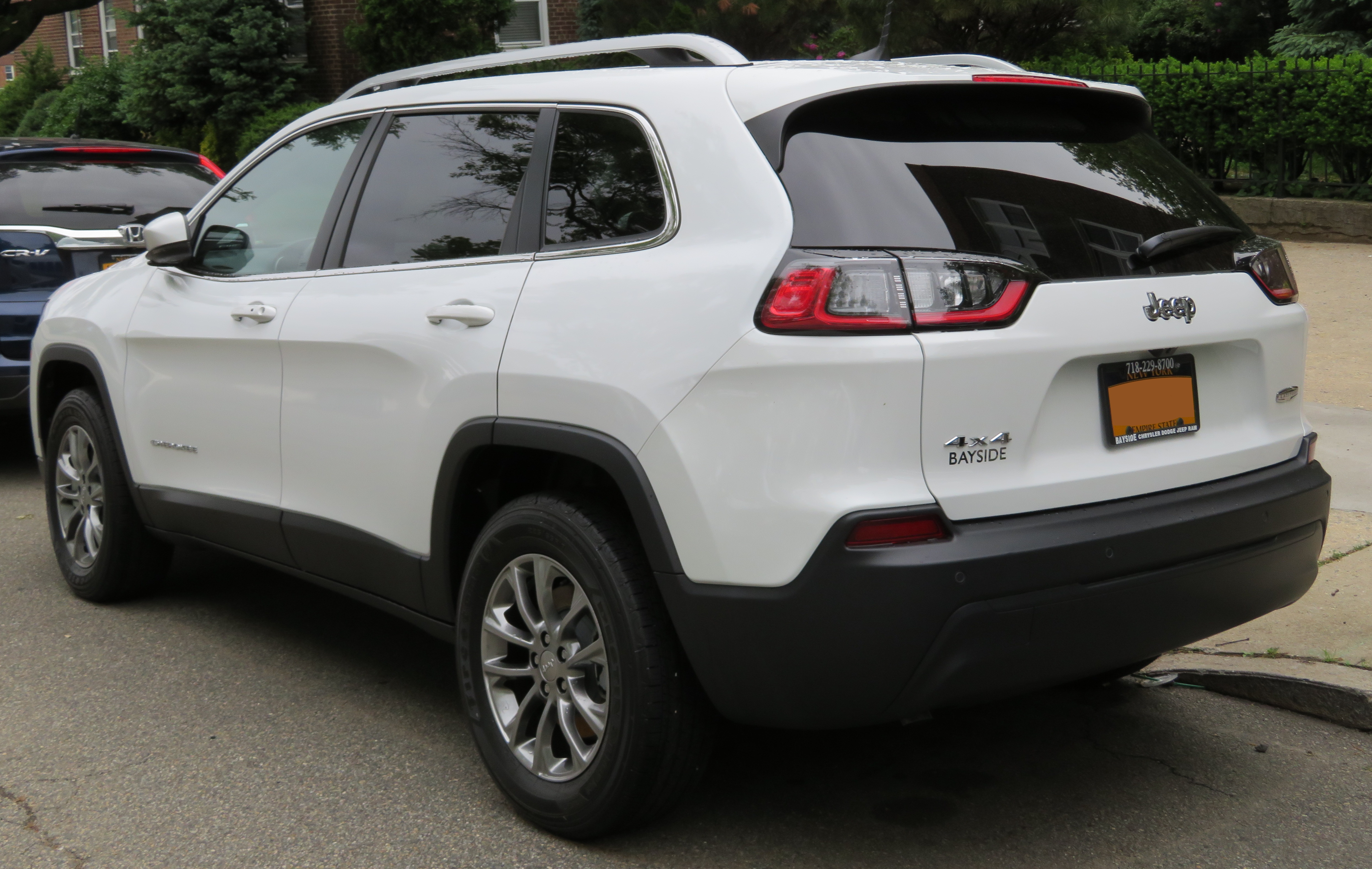
2019 facelift

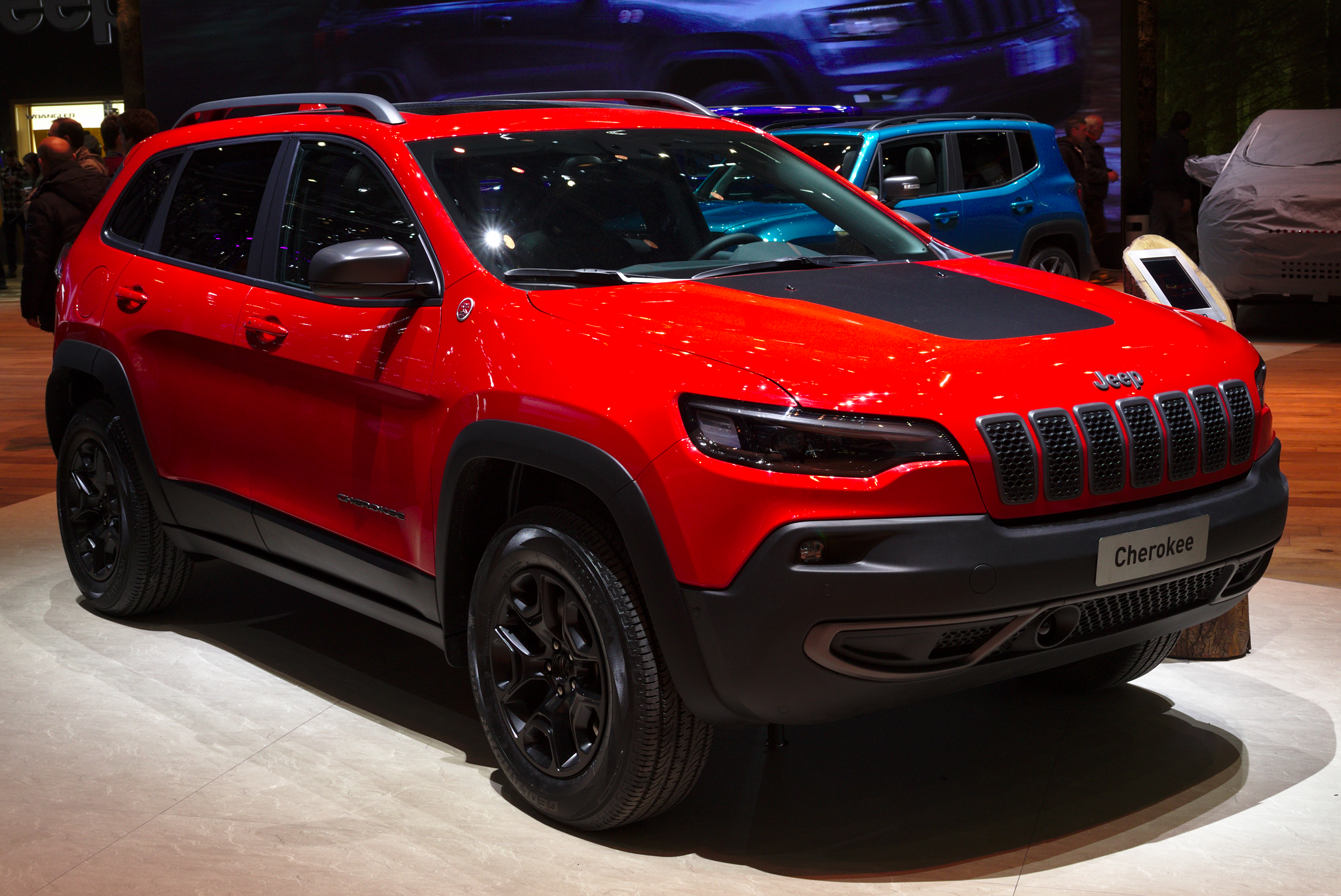

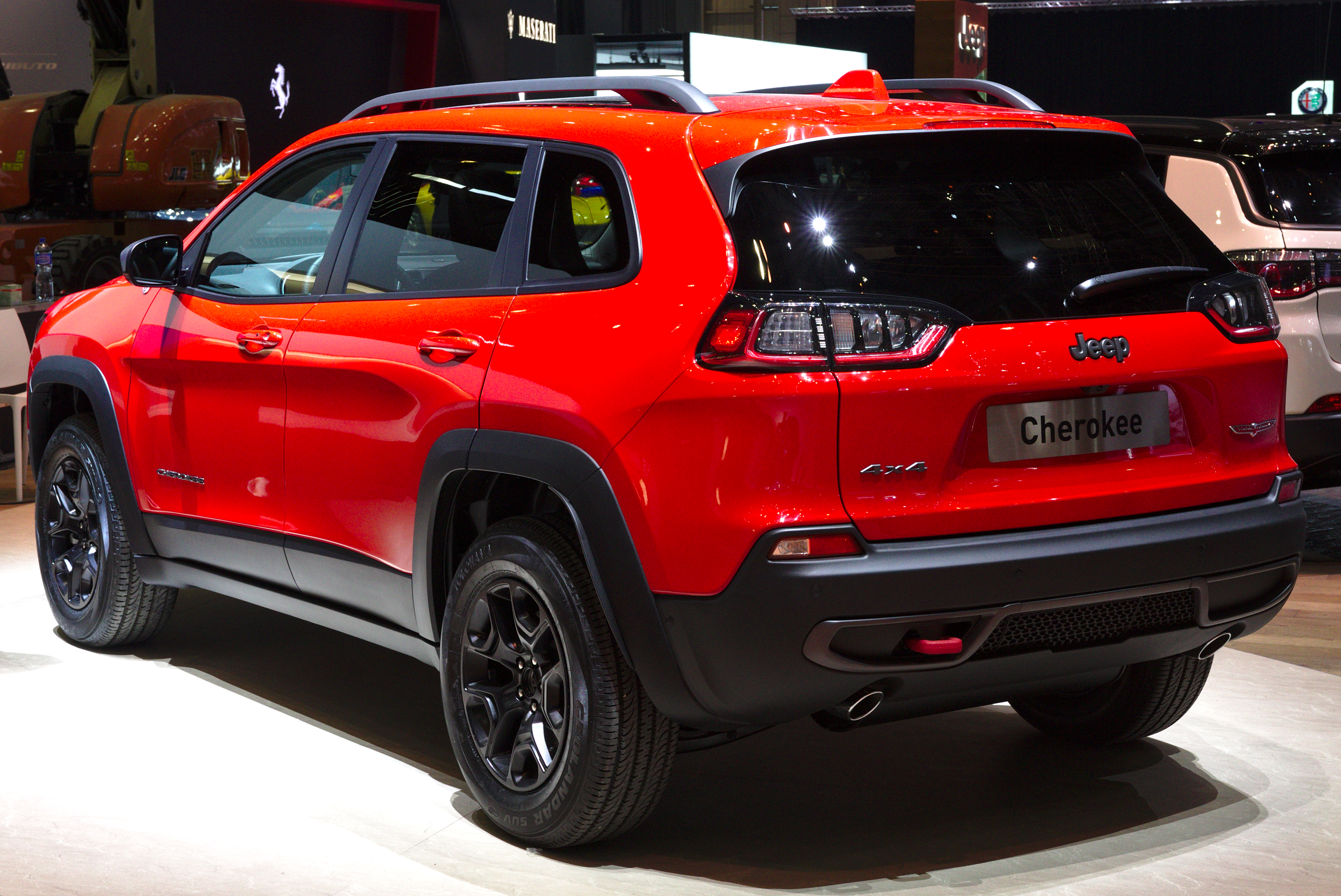
2019 Trailhawk

The front grille on the Cherokee has been moved down slightly to allow for larger front headlamps with LED daytime running lamps (DRLs), and the turn signals are now integrated into the front headlamps. All trim levels of the new Cherokee received new wheel designs. The rear end of the 2019 Cherokee resembled the rear end of the second-generation Jeep Compass, with similar LED rear tail lamps.

On the interior, the Cherokee has changed little from the pre-facelift 2014–18 version. Some trim levels of the Cherokee received new seat fabrics, and all trim levels received improved interior materials (all trim levels receive new interior color schemes). The infotainment systems have also been upgraded to the fourth-generation Uconnect 4 systems. The base system (Uconnect 4 7.0) replaced the previous Uconnect 3 5.0BT radio on base trim levels, and the Uconnect 4C 8.4 systems replaced the Uconnect 3C systems, adding 4G LTE Wi-Fi connectivity and SiriusXM Guardian service (for either six months when not equipped with GPS navigation or one year when equipped with GPS navigation). All systems receive an improved user interface, and standard Apple CarPlay and Android Auto. The larger Uconnect 4C 8.4 systems integrated with the SiriusXM Guardian smartphone application for iOS and Android, with an application for smartwatches such as the Apple Watch and Android Wear devices, and with Amazon Alexa (Amazon Echo) devices. The UConnect 4C 8.4 was first introduced on the 2018 Cherokee Latitude Plus with the Tech Connect Package (the Latitude Plus with Tech Connect Package was discontinued for 2019, as its features had been integrated into the 2019 Jeep Cherokee lineup).

Engine choices for the 2019 Cherokee include the previously available 180-horsepower (182 PS; 134 kW) 2.4-liter Multi-Air inline four-cylinder (I4) and the 271-horsepower (275 PS; 202 kW) 3.2-liter Pentastar VVT V6 gasoline-powered units, though the V6 engine now came as standard equipment on the upper trim levels of the Cherokee, where it was previously optional. However, a new engine, the 2.0-liter Hurricane turbocharged inline four-cylinder (I4) engine, was now available on higher trim levels of the Cherokee, and produced 270 horsepower (274 PS; 201 kW). All engines remained mated to a ZF-manufactured 948TE 9-speed automatic transmission, with a choice of either front- or four-wheel drive. All engines and transmissions received improvements for improved reliability and fuel economy.

While only the uplevel Limited and Trailhawk trims were shown at its debut, the 2019 Jeep Cherokee eventually became available in Latitude, Latitude Plus, Limited, Trailhawk, Overland, and Trailhawk Elite trims. The Latitude trim replaced the previous base Sport trim for 2019. The all-new 2019 Cherokee went on sale at Jeep dealerships in the United States in early 2018 as an early 2019 model year vehicle.

Production of the Jeep Cherokee was relocated from the Toledo Complex in Toledo, Ohio, to the Belvidere Assembly Plant in Belvidere, Illinois that once produced the first-generation Jeep Compass MK and Jeep Patriot, and the Dodge Dart (PF), in late 2017 in order to make way for production of the all-new 2018 Jeep Wrangler (JL). Both plants received an extensive retooling in order to produce their respective vehicles. The Belvidere Assembly Plant temporarily closed for retooling following production of the final 2017 Jeep Compass MK and Jeep Patriot in December 2016.

Fiat Chrysler has released a television commercial for the restyled 2019 Cherokee for the U.S. market, entitled "The World Comes With It," which also appeared on the manufacturer's website for the vehicle.

For 2022, the Jeep Cherokee lineup was simplified to Latitude Lux, X, Trailhawk, and Limited. The 8.4-inch touchscreen became standard equipment on all models. For 2023, the final model year, the lineup was further simplified to the Altitude Lux and Trailhawk.

For the 2023 model year, the Cherokee lineup consisted of two models: Altitude Lux (replacing the previous Latitude Lux trim, adding black accents on the exterior of the vehicle), and Trailhawk. The 2.4L Tigershark inline four-cylinder gasoline engine returned for the Altitude Lux trim as its sole engine option, while the Trailhawk gained the previously optional 2.0L turbocharged inline-four gasoline engine as standard equipment (both engines retained the ZF 9HP-based 948TE nine-speed automatic transmission), and both models were now only available with four-wheel drive.The Altitude Lux model gained a new Lux Elite Package that added the Jeep Memory System for the driver's seat, radio, and exterior side mirrors, a dual-pane panoramic power moonroof, a "hands-free" power rear liftgate; a 506-watt, nine-speaker Alpine premium surround-sound audio system with a subwoofer; a dual-pane panoramic moonroof; and heated and ventilated front seats. The Trailhawk model gains a Premium Leather Package that adds the Jeep Memory System for the driver's seat, radio, and exterior side mirrors, am eight-way power-adjustable front passenger seat with power lumbar support, a "hands-free" power rear liftgate, and heated and ventilated front seats, replacing the previous Trailhawk Elite Package. A Sun and Sound Group for the Trailhawk model adds a 506-watt, nine-speaker Alpine premium surround-sound audio system with a subwoofer and a dual-pane panoramic moonroof.

As a result of Stellantis idling the Belvidere plant, production of the Cherokee ended on February 28, 2023. The Compass became Jeep's sole compact CUV as a result. The Grand Cherokee was unaffected by the idling of Belvidere, as it was built at a different plant.

== Other markets ==
The Jeep Cherokee returned to the Chinese market in October 2015 for the 2016 model year since production ended ten years earlier with the Jeep Cherokee (XJ). The new Jeep Cherokee (KL) was now assembled by GAC Fiat Chrysler in Changsha. A 2.4-liter engine was available paired to a 9-speed automatic gearbox until 2017 alongside the 2.0-liter naturally aspirated gasoline engine. 2019 models were available with the 2.0-liter naturally aspirated gasoline engine producing 148 and 155 hp (150 and 157 PS; 110 and 116 kW) and 2.0-liter Tigershark turbocharged engine producing 234 and 265 hp (237 and 269 PS; 174 and 198 kW) paired to a 9-speed automatic gearbox. Eight trim levels are currently available for purchase and pricing ranges from 185,800 yuan to 319,800 yuan (US$26,830 to 46,180) with the pre-facelift and facelift models sold together as of 2019. The pre-facelift version is known as New Cherokee Classic while the latter is known as the New Cherokee.

== Sales ==
Year	United States	Canada	China	Europe	Global
2013	25,786	2,906			31,330
2014	178,508	22,529			236,289
2015	220,260	31,833	8,005	12,442	295,081
2016	199,736	32,465	106,793	9,740	355,402
2017	169,882	23,702	77,124	5,531	281,073
2018	239,437	22,239	30,799	3,812	300,821
2019	191,397	14,687	17,277	4,915	228,276
2020	135,855	8,568	10,628	2,237	157,288
2021	89,126	9,233	2,419	339	
2022	40,322	6,371	130	3	
2023	24,610	4,183			
2024	2,839	822			

== Safety ==
=== Euro NCAP ===
==== 2013 ====
Euro NCAP test results* Jeep Cherokee (2013)
Test	Points	%
Overall:	5 /5 stars	
Adult occupant:	33	93%
Child occupant:	39	79%
Pedestrian:	24	67%
Safety assist:	7	74%

==== 2019 ====
Euro NCAP test results* Jeep Cherokee 2.2 diesel ESS 'Limited' (LHD) (2019)
Test	Points	%
Overall:	4 /5 stars	
Adult occupant:	30.7	80%
Child occupant:	38.3	78%
Pedestrian:	27.2	56%
Safety assist:	9.1	69%

=== IIHS ===
The 2022 Cherokee was safety tested by the IIHS:

IIHS Cherokee scores (2022):
Small overlap front (Driver)	Good	
Small overlap front (Passenger)	Good	
Moderate overlap front	Good	
Side (original test)	Good	
Roof strength	Good	
Head restraints and seats	Good	
Headlights	Acceptable / Marginal	varies by trim/option
Front crash prevention (Vehicle-to-Vehicle)	Superior	optional
Child seat anchors (LATCH) ease of use	Good+	

=== ANCAP ===
ANCAP test results* Jeep Cherokee all variants with 4 cylinder engines (2016)
Test	Score
Overall	5 /5 stars
Frontal offset	15.16/16
Side impact	16/16
Pole	2/2
Seat belt reminders	3/3
Whiplash protection	Good
Pedestrian protection	Adequate
Electronic stability control	Standard

== Awards ==
As of February 2014, the 2014 Cherokee was the top-ranked Affordable Compact SUV in U.S. News & World Report's rankings.
