= Fiat X1/23 =

Concept car

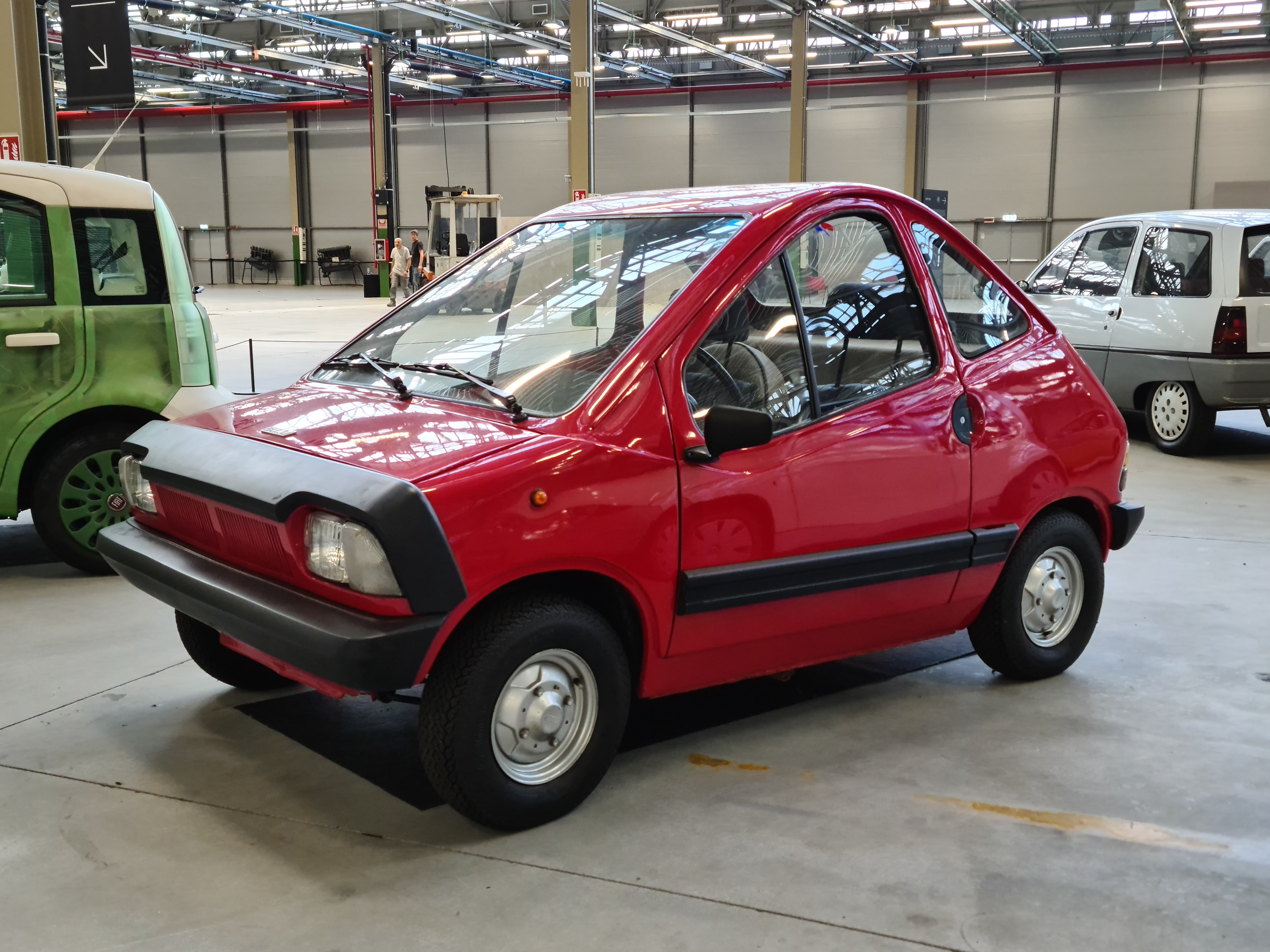
Fiat X 1/23 city car concept at the Heritage Hub in Turin.

The Fiat X1/23 is a concept car originally shown in 1972 at the Turin Motor Show and in 1976 as an electric car by the Italian manufacturer Fiat. Designed by Centro Stile Fiat, it is a small two-seater city car, unlike any Fiat produced at the time.

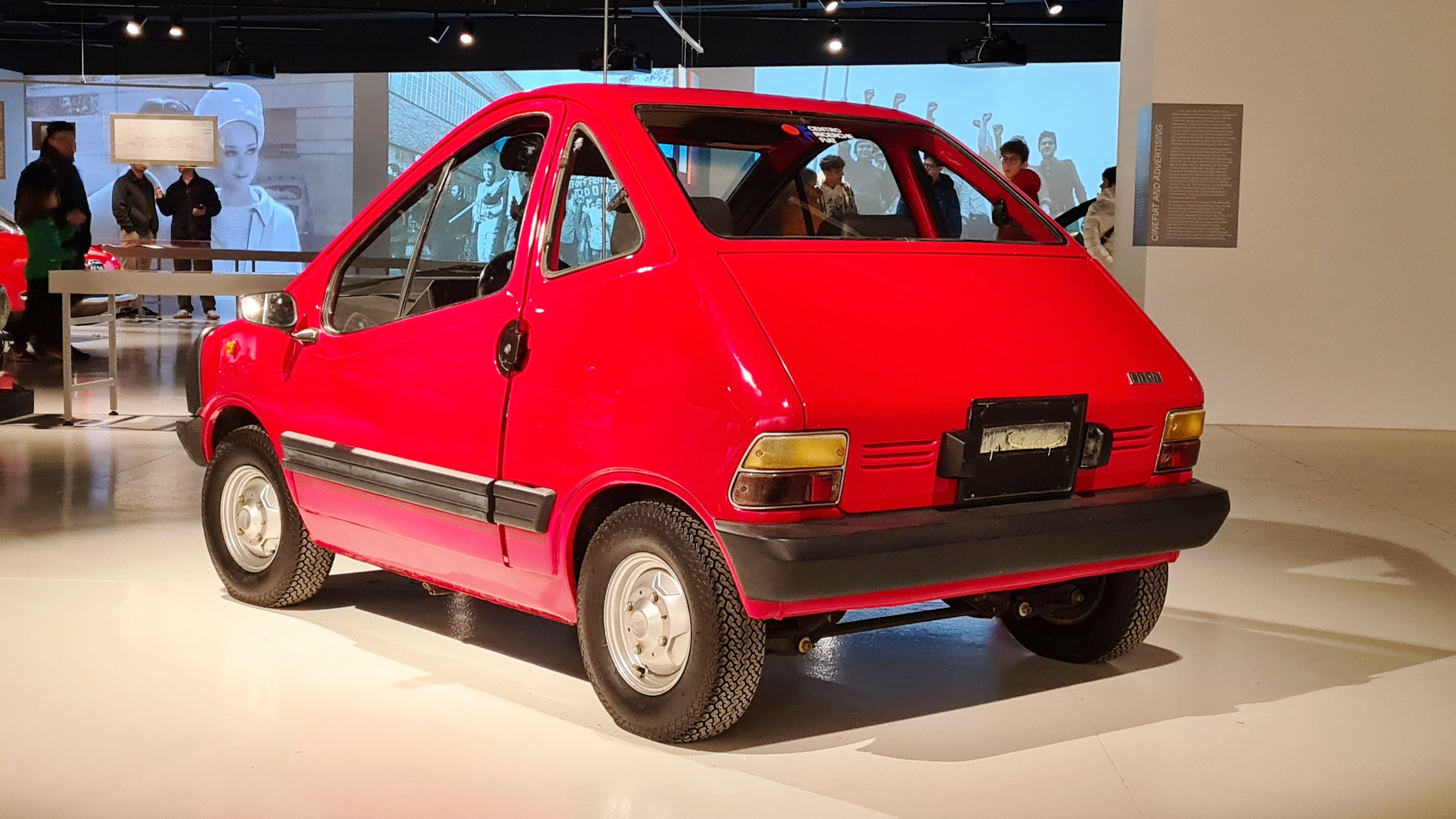
Fiat X1/23 rear

The 1976 X1/23 is fitted with a 14 kW electric motor driving the front wheels and equipped with regenerative braking. Batteries are located at the rear. The X1/23 has a top speed of 45 mph (72.4 km/h) and a claimed range of about 50 miles (80.5 km). Despite its diminutive size, the car weighs 820 kg (1,810 lb), 166 kg (366 lb) of which was due to the battery.
