= GSE =

GSE may refer to:

== Commerce and finance ==
- Ghana Stock Exchange
- Government-sponsored enterprise
- Guwahati Stock Exchange, in Assam, India

== Education ==
- Barcelona Graduate School of Economics
- Golden State Exams, in California, United States
- Stanford University Graduate School of Education

== Technology ==
- Fiat Global Small Engine, a class of automobile engine
- Generic Stream Encapsulation, a networking protocol
- Generic Substation Events, a networking standard
- Ground support equipment, every ground vehicle of an airport terminal
- GSE Systems, an American software developer
- XNA Game Studio Express, an integrated development environment

== Other uses ==
- Gaia-Sausage-Enceladus
- Gaussian Symplectic ensemble
- General somatic efferent fibers
- Georgian Soviet Encyclopedia
- Georgian State Electrosystem
- Ghanaian Sign Language
- Gluten sensitive enteropathy
- Gothenburg City Airport, in Sweden
- Grape seed extract
- Grapefruit seed extract
- Great Soviet Encyclopedia
- Green Street Elite, a fictional football firm in the film Green Street

== See also ==
- GGSE (disambiguation)
- GES (disambiguation)
- EGS (disambiguation)
- ESG (disambiguation)
- SEG (disambiguation)
- SGE (disambiguation)
