= Fastback (disambiguation) =

Fastback is a car body style characterized by a continuous slope from the roof to the base of the deck lid.

Fastback may also refer to:

- Fastback (comics), DC Comics fictional superhero
- FastBack (software), software for backing up Macintosh and IBM PC computers
- Fiat Fastback, also called Abarth Fastback, a subcompact coupe SUV
- Fiat Fastback (concept car), a concept coupe SUV
- IBM Tivoli Storage Manager FastBack, continuous data protection and recovery management platform
- Capella Fastback, one of the Capella XS light aircraft
- Norton Commando Fastback, the original version of the Commando line introduced from 1968
