= Stellantis India =

Indian automotive company

Stellantis India Private Limited
- Type: Subsidiary
- Industry: Automotive
- Founded: 2 January 1997; 29 years ago
- Headquarters: Pune, Maharashtra, India
- Key people: Partha Datta (president & managing director)
- Products: Automobiles; Engines; Transmissions
- Brands: Jeep; Maserati; Citroën
- Parent: Stellantis
- Website: media.stellantis.com

Stellantis India Private Limited (Previously known as Fiat Group Automobiles India Private Limited and FCA India Automobiles Private Limited) is the Indian subsidiary of Stellantis formed in 1997. The company has been involved in the manufacturing and distribution of passenger vehicles in India under brands including Fiat, Abarth and Jeep.

The company's operations have evolved alongside the restructuring of Fiat Chrysler Automobiles and the formation of Stellantis in 2021. Stellantis has expanded its presence in India through the Jeep and Citroën brands, with activities including vehicle manufacturing, engineering, research and development.

Stellantis operates in India's passenger vehicle market, where its brands compete with domestic and international automotive manufacturers.

== History ==
=== Early operations ===
Fiat has a long history in the Indian automotive market, initially operating through licensing agreements with domestic automobile manufacturers. Premier Automobiles Limited manufactured Fiat-derived vehicles, including versions of the Fiat 1100, which later became known as the Premier Padmini. The company also manufactured the Premier 118NE, a vehicle based on the Fiat 124 but equipped with a Nissan engine.

During the 1990s, Fiat expanded its direct involvement in the Indian passenger vehicle market. The Fiat Uno was launched in India in April 1996 through Premier Automobiles. Fiat subsequently introduced other passenger cars, including the Fiat Palio, as part of its efforts to establish a broader presence in the Indian market.

=== Fiat–Tata partnership ===
In March 2006, Fiat and Tata Motors began collaborating on the distribution of Fiat-branded passenger cars through Tata's dealership network. On 14 December 2006, the companies announced an industrial joint venture to manufacture passenger vehicles, engines and transmissions at Fiat's existing facility in Ranjangaon, Maharashtra.

The manufacturing venture was structured as a partnership between Fiat and Tata Motors, with both companies participating equally in its management. The Ranjangaon facility was designed to manufacture more than 100,000 passenger cars and 200,000 engines and transmissions annually at full capacity. The project included production of vehicles for both domestic and international markets.

The plant began operations under the joint venture in April 2008. It manufactured Fiat models including the Fiat Linea and Fiat Punto, alongside Tata vehicles such as the Tata Indica Vista and Tata Manza. The facility also produced engines and transmissions used in vehicles marketed by both manufacturers.

The partnership included the production of Fiat diesel powertrains, particularly the 1.3-litre Multijet engine, which was used in several passenger vehicles in the Indian market.

In May 2012, Fiat and Tata Motors announced plans to reorganise their partnership. Under the revised arrangement, responsibility for distributing and marketing Fiat-branded passenger vehicles in India was transferred to a separate Fiat-owned company, while their manufacturing collaboration continued. The companies subsequently signed a restructuring framework agreement in March 2013.

=== Expansion under Fiat Chrysler Automobiles ===
Following the establishment of Fiat Chrysler Automobiles (FCA) in 2014, the group's Indian operations expanded beyond Fiat-branded passenger vehicles.

In 2015, the luxury automotive manufacturer Maserati returned to the Indian market, introducing a new dealership network and imported vehicles including the Ghibli and Quattroporte. The brand opened dealerships in major Indian cities, including New Delhi, Bengaluru and Mumbai.

In August 2016, FCA launched the Jeep brand in India with imported models including the Jeep Wrangler and Jeep Grand Cherokee. The company subsequently expanded its local manufacturing operations to produce the Jeep Compass at Ranjangaon.

=== Jeep manufacturing and exports ===
FCA invested approximately US$280 million to support local production of the Jeep Compass at the Ranjangaon manufacturing facility. On 1 June 2017, the first locally manufactured Compass rolled off the assembly line, marking the beginning of Jeep vehicle production in India.

The Ranjangaon facility became a manufacturing and export centre for right-hand-drive versions of the Compass. It supplied vehicles to international markets, including Japan and the United Kingdom. India joined Brazil, China and Mexico as one of the countries manufacturing the Compass.

The Jeep Compass was launched in India on 31 July 2017, with customer deliveries beginning in August. By September 2017, FCA reported receiving approximately 10,000 bookings for the vehicle, prompting an increase in production at Ranjangaon.

=== Discontinuation of Fiat passenger vehicles ===
During the late 2010s, sales of Fiat-branded passenger vehicles in India declined. The company's remaining passenger car range included the Fiat Linea, Fiat Punto Evo and related derivatives.

In February 2019, FCA decided to discontinue sales of Fiat-branded passenger cars in India following declining demand and changing vehicle safety and emissions regulations.

Production of Fiat-branded passenger cars ended in early 2019, although FCA continued to provide after-sales support for existing customers. The group increasingly concentrated its Indian passenger vehicle operations on the Jeep brand.

Production of the 1.3-litre Multijet diesel engine in India was also discontinued in early 2020, ahead of the implementation of Bharat Stage 6 emissions standards.

=== Stellantis era ===
On 16 January 2021, Fiat Chrysler Automobiles and Groupe PSA completed their merger to establish Stellantis, bringing together automotive brands including Fiat, Jeep, Citroën, Peugeot and Maserati.

Following the merger, Stellantis continued its Indian operations through the Jeep and Citroën brands, supported by manufacturing, engineering and research and development facilities.

In May 2022, Stellantis announced that its predecessor companies had invested more than €1 billion in India since 2015. The company identified India as an important manufacturing, engineering and export centre within its international operations.

The company's Indian product range expanded during 2022 with the introduction of vehicles including the Jeep Meridian and Citroën C3. Stellantis also continued to develop its Indian manufacturing and supplier network to support domestic production and vehicle exports.

In September 2026, Stellantis announced that it had acquired the remaining stake held by Hindustan Motor Finance Corporation in Stellantis Automobiles India Private Limited, giving the group full ownership of the manufacturing operations at Thiruvallur, Tamil Nadu.

== Corporate structure and joint ventures ==
Stellantis conducts its automotive operations in India through subsidiaries, joint ventures and affiliated companies involved in vehicle manufacturing, powertrain production, engineering and distribution. The group's Indian operations include partnerships originally established by Fiat Chrysler Automobiles (FCA) and Groupe PSA before their merger to form Stellantis in January 2021.

=== Fiat India Automobiles ===
Fiat India Automobiles Private Limited (FIAPL) is a 50:50 manufacturing joint venture between Stellantis and Tata Motors, established through an industrial partnership announced in December 2006. The company operates the Ranjangaon manufacturing facility near Pune, Maharashtra, producing vehicles and components for both automotive groups.

The partnership originally involved Fiat and Tata Motors and was subsequently maintained following Fiat's integration into FCA and the formation of Stellantis. The Ranjangaon facility has manufactured Fiat, Jeep and Tata vehicles, as well as engines and transmissions.

In October 2026, Stellantis and Tata Motors Passenger Vehicles announced an expansion of their collaboration to include the joint development of vehicles for international markets. The agreement built upon their existing manufacturing partnership through FIAPL and extended cooperation into vehicle architecture, engineering and product development.

=== Stellantis Automobiles India ===
Stellantis Automobiles India Private Limited (SAIPL) was established as a manufacturing joint venture between Groupe PSA and Hindustan Motor Finance Corporation Limited, a company belonging to the CK Birla Group. The partnership, formed in 2017, supported the establishment of Citroën vehicle manufacturing operations in India.

The company operates a vehicle assembly facility at Thiruvallur, Tamil Nadu, which manufactures Citroën passenger vehicles for domestic and export markets.

On 21 September 2026, Stellantis announced that it had acquired the remaining equity stake held by Hindustan Motor Finance Corporation in SAIPL, making it a wholly owned subsidiary. The transaction ended the manufacturing joint venture with the CK Birla Group and transferred full ownership of the Thiruvallur facility to Stellantis.

=== Stellantis Avtec Powertrain India ===
Stellantis Avtec Powertrain India Private Limited, formerly PSA AVTEC Powertrain Private Limited, is a powertrain manufacturing joint venture established in 2017 between Groupe PSA and AVTEC Limited, a company belonging to the CK Birla Group.

The joint venture was established with equal ownership by the two partners and operates a manufacturing facility at Hosur, Tamil Nadu. The facility specialises in producing engines and transmissions for domestic and international automotive markets.

The Hosur plant was inaugurated in November 2018 with an initial planned annual production capacity of approximately 300,000 transmissions and 200,000 engines. The venture was established to support Groupe PSA's Indian manufacturing operations and supply powertrain components to international markets.

The company subsequently adopted the Stellantis Avtec Powertrain India name following the formation of Stellantis.

== Brands and models ==
=== Fiat ===
==== Discontinued models ====
Model	Released	Discontinued	Image	Notes
Uno	1997	2002		
Siena	1999	2004		
Palio	2001	2010		
Palio Adventure	2002	2007		
Palio Weekend	2002	2005		
Petra	2004	2008		
500	2008	2010		Imported from Poland
Grande Punto	2008	2014		
Linea	2009	2018		
Bravo	2010	2011		Imported from Italy
Punto Evo	2014	2018		
Avventura	2014	2018		

=== Abarth ===
==== Discontinued models ====
Model	Released	Discontinued	Image	Notes
595 Competizione	2014	2017		Imported from Poland
Punto 310	2015	2018		

=== Jeep ===
==== Current models ====
Model	Indian introduction	Current model		Notes
Model	Indian introduction	Introduction	Update (facelift)	Notes
SUV/crossover
Compass	2017	2017	2021	
Meridian	2022	2022	2024	
Wrangler (JL)	2020	2020	2024	
Grand Cherokee (WL)	2022	2022	–	

==== Discontinued models ====
Model	Released	Discontinued	Image	Notes
Wrangler (JK)	2016	2020		Imported from US
Grand Cherokee (WK2)	2016	2020		Imported from US

=== Maserati ===
==== Current models ====
Model	Indian introduction	Current model		Notes
Model	Indian introduction	Introduction	Update (facelift)	Notes
SUV/crossover
Grecale	2024	2024	–	Imported from Italy
Sports car
MC20	2022	2022	–	Imported from Italy
Coupe
GranTurismo (M189)	2024	2024	–	Imported from Italy

==== Discontinued models ====
Model	Released	Discontinued	Image	Notes
Ghibli	2015	2023		Imported from Italy
Quattroporte	2015	2023		Imported from Italy
Levante	2016	2024		Imported from Italy
GranTurismo (M145)	2016	2019		Imported from Italy

=== Citroën ===
==== Current models ====
===== ICE Vehicles =====
Model	Indian introduction	Current model		Notes
Model	Indian introduction	Introduction	Update (facelift)	Notes
Hatchback
C3	2022	2022	–	
SUV/crossover
Basalt	2024	2024	–	
C3 Aircross	2023	2023	–	
C5 Aircross	2021	2021	2022	

===== Electric Vehicles =====
Model	Indian introduction	Current model		Notes
Model	Indian introduction	Introduction	Update (facelift)	Notes
Hatchback
ë-C3	2023	2023	–	

== Manufacturing facilities ==
=== Ranjangaon plant ===
The Ranjangaon manufacturing facility, located near Pune in Maharashtra, is operated by Fiat India Automobiles Private Limited (FIAPL), a joint venture between Stellantis and Tata Motors. The facility manufactures passenger vehicles, engines and transmissions for the two automotive groups.

The plant covers approximately 200 acres (81 hectares). In April 2014, it had an annual production capacity of 160,000 vehicles and 350,000 engines.

Historically, the facility produced Fiat models including the Fiat Linea, Grande Punto, Punto Evo and Fiat Avventura, as well as Tata models including the Tata Indica Vista, Tata Manza and Tata Zest. The plant also manufactured petrol and diesel engines, including the 1.2-litre and 1.4-litre FIRE petrol engines and the 1.3-litre Multijet diesel engine.

In April 2014, the facility had produced its 300,000th passenger car, a Fiat Linea. The plant had previously reached cumulative production of 500,000 engines in 2013.

==== Jeep production and exports ====
In 2017, Fiat Chrysler Automobiles (FCA) began manufacturing the Jeep Compass at Ranjangaon as part of an investment of approximately US$280 million. The first locally produced Compass rolled off the assembly line on 1 June 2017, with the facility serving both the domestic market and international right-hand-drive export markets.

In May 2022, Jeep began production of the Jeep Meridian at the same facility, expanding its locally manufactured SUV range.

In 2026, Jeep reported that the Ranjangaon facility had an installed annual capacity of 160,000 vehicles. The plant continued to manufacture vehicles for domestic and export markets, including the Compass and Meridian.

=== Thiruvallur plant ===
Stellantis also operates a manufacturing facility at Thiruvallur, Tamil Nadu, associated with the production of Citroën vehicles. The facility has supported the group's Smart Car platform and its domestic and export operations.

On 23 April 2026, Stellantis announced that the Thiruvallur facility had produced its 50,000th vehicle based on the Smart Car platform.

In September 2026, Stellantis acquired the remaining stake held by Hindustan Motor Finance Corporation Limited in Stellantis Automobiles India Private Limited, gaining full ownership of the Thiruvallur manufacturing operations. At the time, the company announced plans to increase annual production from approximately 16,000 vehicles in 2026 to more than 43,000 by 2028.

=== Hosur plant ===
Stellantis operates a powertrain manufacturing facility at Hosur, Tamil Nadu, through Stellantis Avtec Powertrain India Private Limited, a joint venture originally established between Groupe PSA and AVTEC Limited, a company belonging to the CK Birla Group. The joint venture was announced in January 2017 to manufacture engines and transmissions for domestic and international automotive markets.

The facility was initially planned with an annual manufacturing capacity of approximately 200,000 engines and 300,000 gearboxes. In 2019, Groupe PSA reported that transmission production had begun at Hosur as part of its expansion into the Indian automotive market.

The plant occupies approximately 110 acres (45 hectares) and manufactures several powertrain families, including 1.2-litre naturally aspirated petrol engines, 1.2-litre turbocharged petrol engines and 2.0-litre diesel engines. It also produces five-speed and six-speed manual transmissions for vehicles sold under Stellantis brands.

By November 2025, the facility had an annual production capacity of approximately 300,000 engines and 374,000 gearboxes. Around 95% of its production was exported, supplying international markets including Europe and South America. Its powertrains were used in vehicles marketed under brands including Peugeot and Opel.

The Hosur facility forms part of Stellantis' Indian manufacturing network, alongside the vehicle assembly plants at Ranjangaon in Maharashtra and Thiruvallur in Tamil Nadu.

== Research and development ==
Stellantis maintains research, engineering and software development operations in India that support its domestic and international automotive activities. In May 2022, the company identified two research and development centres in Chennai and Pune, an information and communications technology (ICT) hub in Hyderabad, and a software development centre in Bengaluru. These facilities contribute to vehicle engineering, digital systems and software development across the group's automotive brands.

=== Engineering centres ===
The research and development centres in Chennai and Pune support Stellantis' vehicle development and engineering activities. Their work contributes to the development of vehicles and components intended for both the Indian market and international markets.

Stellantis has also undertaken vehicle-platform development in India. In April 2026, the company stated that its Smart Car platform, used for vehicles including the Citroën Basalt, had been conceived, developed and industrialised in India by local research and development teams.

=== Software and technology development ===
Stellantis operates an ICT and digital technology hub in Hyderabad, which supports the group's global information technology and digital operations.

On 12 October 2022, Stellantis inaugurated a software and technology centre in Bengaluru, Karnataka. The facility covers approximately 50,000 square feet (4,600 square metres) and was established to support the development of automotive software, digital vehicle systems and advanced mobility technologies.

The Bengaluru centre serves as a principal development location for the STLA SmartCockpit platform, which integrates vehicle infotainment, connectivity and digital services. Its activities also include research and development relating to artificial intelligence, advanced driver-assistance systems (ADAS), and software architecture for software-defined vehicles.

In July 2024, Stellantis reported that the Bengaluru technology hub continued to contribute to the development of STLA SmartCockpit and STLA AutoDrive technologies, including vehicle operating systems, connected services and driver-assistance software.

== Exports ==
Stellantis and its Indian manufacturing affiliates export passenger vehicles, engines, transmissions and automotive components to international markets. The group's manufacturing facilities at Ranjangaon, Thiruvallur and Hosur have supported export activities under the Jeep and Citroën brands, as well as the supply of powertrain components to overseas markets.

=== Jeep exports ===
Fiat Chrysler Automobiles (FCA) began exporting the locally manufactured Jeep Compass from its Ranjangaon facility in October 2017. The first shipment consisted of 600 right-hand-drive vehicles destined for Australia and Japan, dispatched through the Bombay Port Trust facility in Mumbai.

The Ranjangaon facility was designated as the global export production centre for right-hand-drive versions of the Compass, supplying markets including Australia, Japan, the United Kingdom, New Zealand and South Africa.

During the 2017–18 financial year, FCA exported 6,716 Jeep Compass vehicles from India. By November 2019, cumulative exports had reached 16,076 units, with the model being shipped to 13 international right-hand-drive markets.

In January 2026, Jeep announced plans to expand its vehicle exports from Ranjangaon, identifying Japan, Australia and New Zealand among its principal export markets.

=== Citroën exports ===
Citroën began exporting the India-manufactured Citroën C3 hatchback in March 2023. The vehicles were produced at the Thiruvallur manufacturing facility in Tamil Nadu and shipped through Kamarajar Port near Chennai. The first shipment, dispatched on 31 March 2023, was intended for markets in Southeast Asia and Africa.

The export programme formed part of Citroën's strategy to use India as a production base for vehicles developed for emerging markets. The C3 was manufactured on the company's C-Cubed platform, which also supported additional models developed for India and international markets.

On 30 April 2026, Stellantis announced the commencement of exports of the Citroën Basalt from India to South Africa. The company stated that cumulative exports of Citroën vehicles from India to South Africa would reach 10,000 units with the shipment.

=== Powertrain exports ===
Stellantis' powertrain manufacturing operations at Hosur, Tamil Nadu, have supplied engines and transmissions to international markets. The facility was established through a joint venture between Groupe PSA and AVTEC Limited, a company belonging to the CK Birla Group.

Exports of powertrain components from Hosur began in 2019. In March 2023, Stellantis India confirmed that the facility had been exporting powertrains since that year, preceding the company's programme of exporting completely built Citroën vehicles.

The Hosur facility forms part of Stellantis' international powertrain supply network, producing engines and transmissions for use in vehicles manufactured and marketed outside India.

== Sales performance ==
=== Fiat sales ===
Fiat recorded approximately 24,000 vehicle sales in India in 2009, compared with 6,897 vehicles in the preceding year. The increase followed the introduction of locally manufactured models and the expansion of Fiat's distribution network through its partnership with Tata Motors.

In April 2010, Fiat announced a target of selling 130,000 cars annually in India by 2014. The target formed part of the company's expansion plans for the Indian passenger vehicle market.

Despite its earlier expansion, Fiat experienced declining sales during the 2010s. By 2018, the company's passenger car range had been reduced to the Fiat Linea, Fiat Punto Evo and related derivatives. The Linea and Grande Punto model ranges recorded combined sales of 101 vehicles between December 2017 and November 2018.

The decline in sales preceded the discontinuation of Fiat-branded passenger cars in India in 2019, as Fiat Chrysler Automobiles increasingly concentrated on the Jeep brand.

=== Jeep sales ===
Jeep entered the Indian passenger vehicle market in 2016, initially offering imported models including the Jeep Wrangler and Jeep Grand Cherokee.

The introduction of the locally manufactured Jeep Compass in July 2017 marked an expansion of Jeep's presence in India. The model received approximately 10,000 bookings within its initial sales period, prompting FCA to increase production at its Ranjangaon manufacturing facility.

By April 2018, Jeep reported that more than 20,000 Compass vehicles had been sold in India since its launch, making the model an important contributor to FCA's domestic passenger vehicle sales.

Following the formation of Stellantis in January 2021, Jeep continued to operate in the Indian SUV market with models including the Compass, Meridian, Wrangler and Grand Cherokee.

=== Citroën sales ===
Citroën entered the Indian passenger vehicle market in April 2021 with the introduction of the Citroën C5 Aircross. The brand subsequently expanded its range with the locally manufactured Citroën C3 in 2022 and the Citroën C3 Aircross in 2023.

Citroën recorded 17,198 domestic passenger vehicle wholesales between April 2022 and February 2024. Of these, 14,493 were C3 hatchback and electric variants, while 2,705 were C5 Aircross and C3 Aircross SUVs.

In May 2025, Stellantis announced a reorganisation of its Indian sales and distribution leadership covering the Jeep and Citroën brands, as well as preparations for the planned introduction of Leapmotor vehicles.

== Sales and service network ==
Stellantis operates sales and after-sales service networks in India through its automotive brands, including Jeep and Citroën. The group's retail operations include authorised dealerships, service workshops and combined-brand facilities. Its predecessor, Fiat Chrysler Automobiles (FCA), previously maintained a distribution and service network for Fiat-branded passenger vehicles.

=== Fiat sales and service network ===
Fiat initially distributed its passenger vehicles in India through a partnership with Tata Motors, under which Fiat vehicles were sold and serviced through selected Tata dealerships.

In May 2012, Fiat and Tata Motors announced the reorganisation of their distribution partnership. Under the revised arrangement, Fiat assumed responsibility for the marketing, distribution and servicing of Fiat-branded vehicles through a separate Fiat-owned company, while the two manufacturers continued their production partnership at Ranjangaon.

Following the discontinuation of Fiat passenger-car production in India in 2019, the company continued to provide after-sales support for existing owners. Fiat India's official website maintains information about authorised workshops and spare-parts distributors.

=== Jeep sales and service network ===
Jeep established its Indian dealership network following the brand's introduction to the market in 2016. The network expanded after the launch of the locally manufactured Jeep Compass in July 2017.

On 19 August 2022, Jeep India inaugurated a showroom in Navi Mumbai, marking its 70th dealership touchpoint in the country. The facility included a showroom in Nerul and an associated service workshop in Turbhe, with the latter occupying more than 43,000 square feet (4,000 square metres).

The Jeep network has subsequently been supplemented by Stellantis Brand House dealerships, which combine Jeep and Citroën sales and after-sales services at selected locations.

=== Citroën sales and service network ===
Citroën established its Indian retail network in 2021, initially supporting sales of the Citroën C5 Aircross. The network subsequently expanded with the introduction of locally manufactured models, including the Citroën C3 and Citroën C3 Aircross.

In March 2024, Citroën announced a Network Expansion Program (NEP) aimed at increasing its sales and service presence from 58 touchpoints to 200 by the end of the year. The programme focused on expanding beyond major metropolitan areas into smaller cities and towns.

By August 2024, Citroën reported a network of 145 sales and service touchpoints following the addition of 15 showrooms and seven workshops. The expansion included locations in Jodhpur, Ranchi, Jalandhar, Indore, Bengaluru and other cities.

On 23 December 2025, Citroën announced the opening of its 126th point of sales and service in Chennai. The company stated that its revised network strategy included conventional dealerships, smaller retail formats and a hub-and-spoke model for sales and after-sales support.

=== Stellantis Brand House ===
Stellantis introduced the Stellantis Brand House (SBH) retail format in India to combine the Jeep and Citroën brands within shared dealership facilities. The format provides vehicle sales, servicing and spare-parts support for both brands.

In August 2025, Stellantis inaugurated a dual-brand facility in Ahmedabad, Gujarat, following the introduction of the format in Surat. The Ahmedabad dealership became the second Stellantis Brand House in Gujarat.

On 31 March 2026, Stellantis opened a Brand House dealership in Goa in partnership with Caculo Motors. The facility provides sales, service and spare-parts support for Jeep and Citroën vehicles, including a service workshop with ten maintenance bays.

In April 2026, the company further expanded the dual-brand network with the inauguration of a Stellantis Brand House in Srinagar, Jammu and Kashmir, offering sales, service and spare-parts support for both brands.

=== After-sales and multibrand servicing ===
In March 2025, Stellantis introduced its Eurorepar Car Service network in India with the opening of its first multibrand workshop in Chennai. The service network was designed to provide maintenance and repair services for vehicles from different manufacturers, rather than exclusively for Stellantis brands.

At the launch, Stellantis announced a target of establishing more than 100 Eurorepar Car Service workshops across India.

== See also ==
- Automotive industry in India
- Stellantis
- Fiat Chrysler Automobiles
- Fiat India Automobiles
- Tata Motors
- Jeep
- Citroën
