= Fiat Pulse =

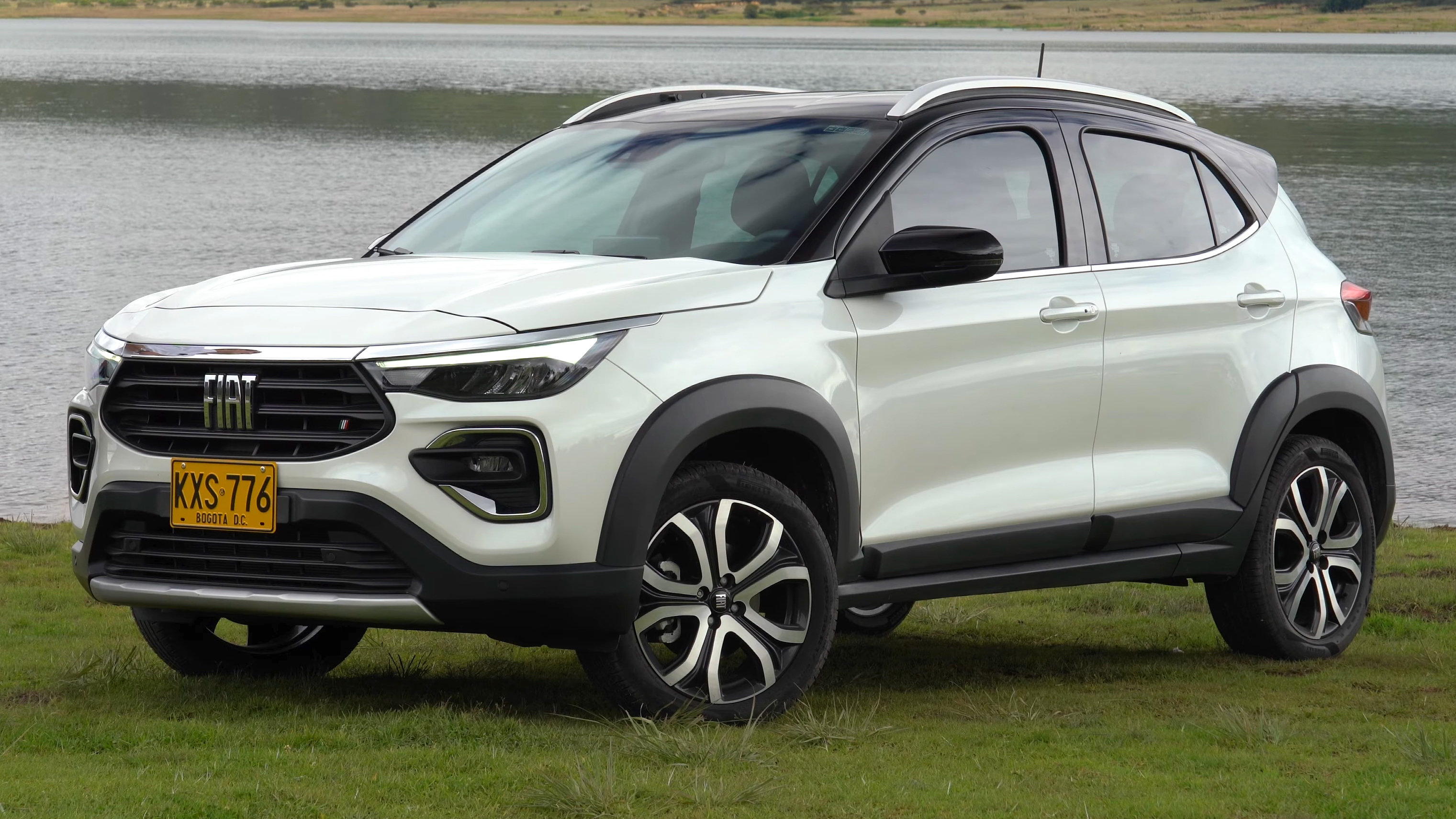
- 2023 Fiat Pulse Impetus (pre-facelift)

Overview
- Manufacturer: Fiat (Stellantis)
- Also called: Abarth Pulse
- Production: July 2021 – present
- Assembly: Brazil: Betim, Minas Gerais

Body and chassis
- Class: Subcompact crossover SUV (B)
- Body style: 5-door hatchback
- Layout: Front-engine, front-wheel-drive
- Platform: MLA
- Related: Fiat Argo; Fiat Cronos; Fiat Fastback

Powertrain
- Engine: Flex fuel petrol: 1.0 L FireFly turbo I3; 1.3 L FireFly I4; 1.3 L GSE turbo I4
- Transmission: 5-speed manual; CVT
- Hybrid drivetrain: 12V Mild Hybrid (T200 Hybrid)

Dimensions
- Wheelbase: 2,532 mm (99.7 in)
- Length: 4,099 mm (161.4 in)
- Width: 1,774 mm (69.8 in)
- Height: 1,579 mm (62.2 in)
- Curb weight: 1,187–1,237 kg (2,617–2,727 lb)

The Fiat Pulse is a subcompact crossover SUV produced by Fiat mainly for the Latin American market since 2021. Produced in Brazil, the Pulse is largely based on the Argo subcompact hatchback. It is also available as a performance model known as the Pulse Abarth and a coupe SUV derivative marketed as the Fiat Fastback since 2022.

== Overview ==
Revealed as an unnamed model in May 2021 in Brazil, its name was subsequently announced in June 2021 after three options were offered to the public, which are Pulse, Tuo, and Domo. Developed under the codename Project 363, the vehicle is built on the MLA platform which in turn is based on an improved platform used by the Argo hatchback. Both cars share some bodywork parts such as the windshield and doors. The Pulse went on sale in Brazil in October 2021 along with other South American countries.

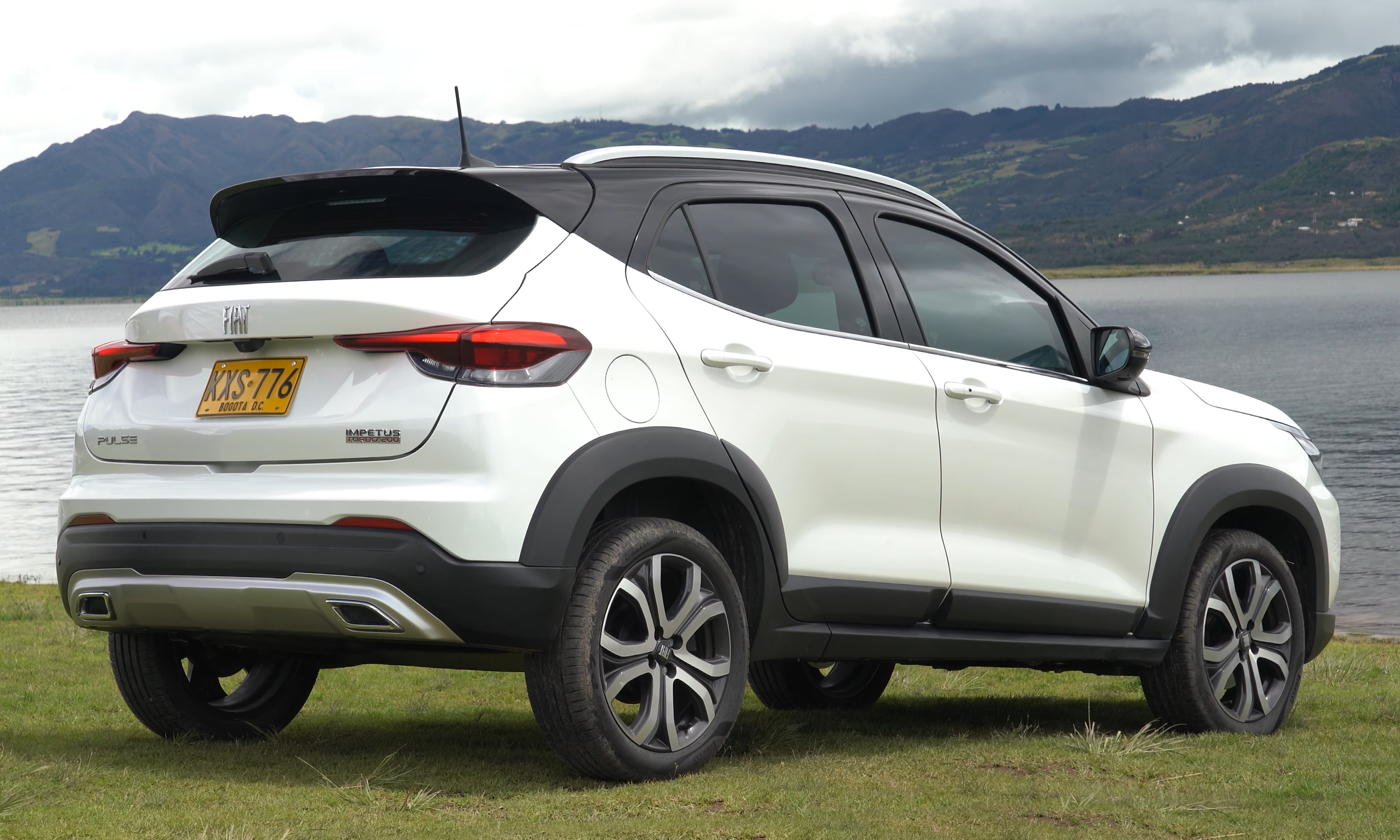
Rear view (pre-facelift)

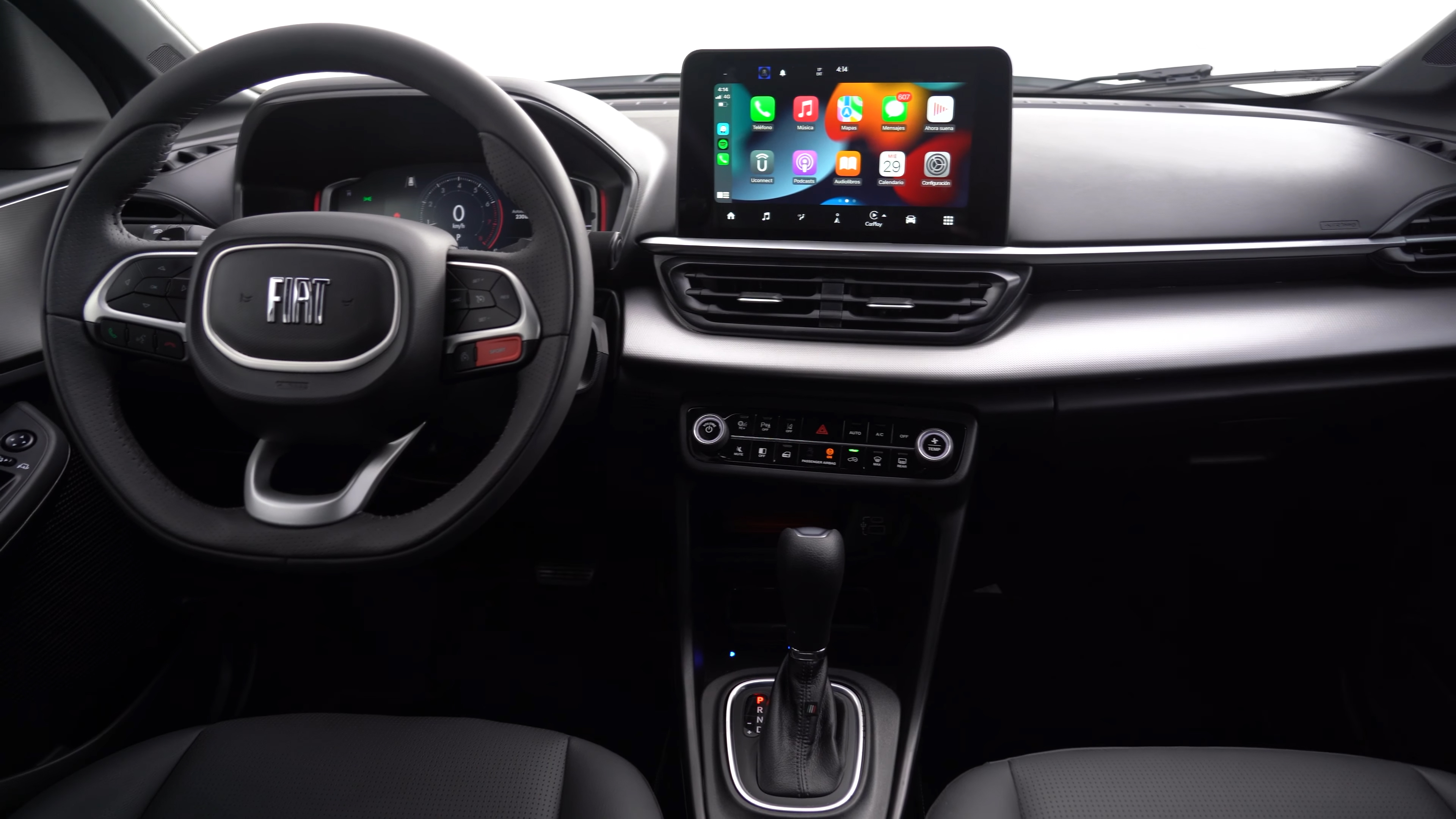
Interior (pre-facelift)

== Abarth Pulse ==
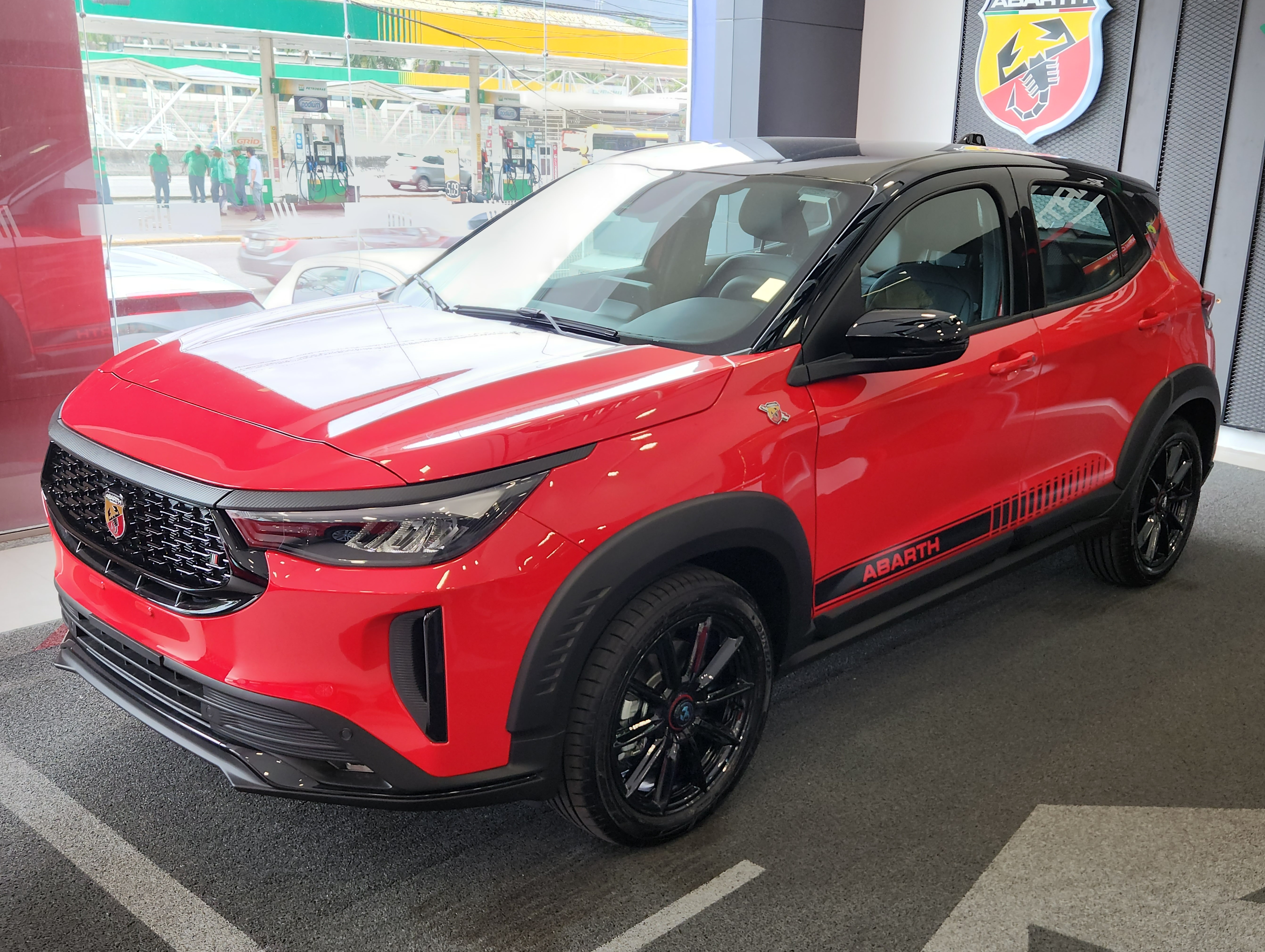
Abarth Pulse

The Abarth Pulse was unveiled in March 2022, featuring exterior changes and a 1.3-litre FireFly turbocharged petrol engine producing 185 PS (182 hp; 136 kW) and 27.5 kg⋅m (270 N⋅m; 199 lb⋅ft) of torque. Fiat claimed a 0–100 km/h (0–62 mph) figure below 8 seconds and a top speed of 210 km/h (130 mph).

== 2025 facelift ==
2026 Pulse Audace (facelift)

On 20 May 2025, the Pulse received a facelift for the 2026 model year, featuring a redesigned front end inspired by the Fiat Fastback, revised bumpers and skid plate, a new vertical-slat grille, updated interior trim, and an optional panoramic sunroof on the Impetus and Abarth versions.

== Safety ==
The Pulse comes with 4 airbags, LED lighting, hill holder, traction control system, ESC, front ventilated disc brakes, and tire pressure monitoring system. Automatic high beam, lane departure warning system, and collision avoidance system are optional.

=== Latin NCAP ===
In 2023, the Pulse in its most basic Latin American market configuration with 4 airbags received 2 stars from Latin NCAP 3.0 (similar to Euro NCAP 2014).

Latin NCAP 3.5 test results Fiat Pulse + 4 Airbags (2023, similar to Euro NCAP 2017)
| Test | Points | % |
|---|---|---|
| Overall: | 2 /5 stars | |
| Adult occupant: | 26.87 | 67% |
| Child occupant: | 27.38 | 56% |
| Pedestrian: | 21.79 | 45% |
| Safety assist: | 24.00 | 56% |

== Fiat Fastback ==
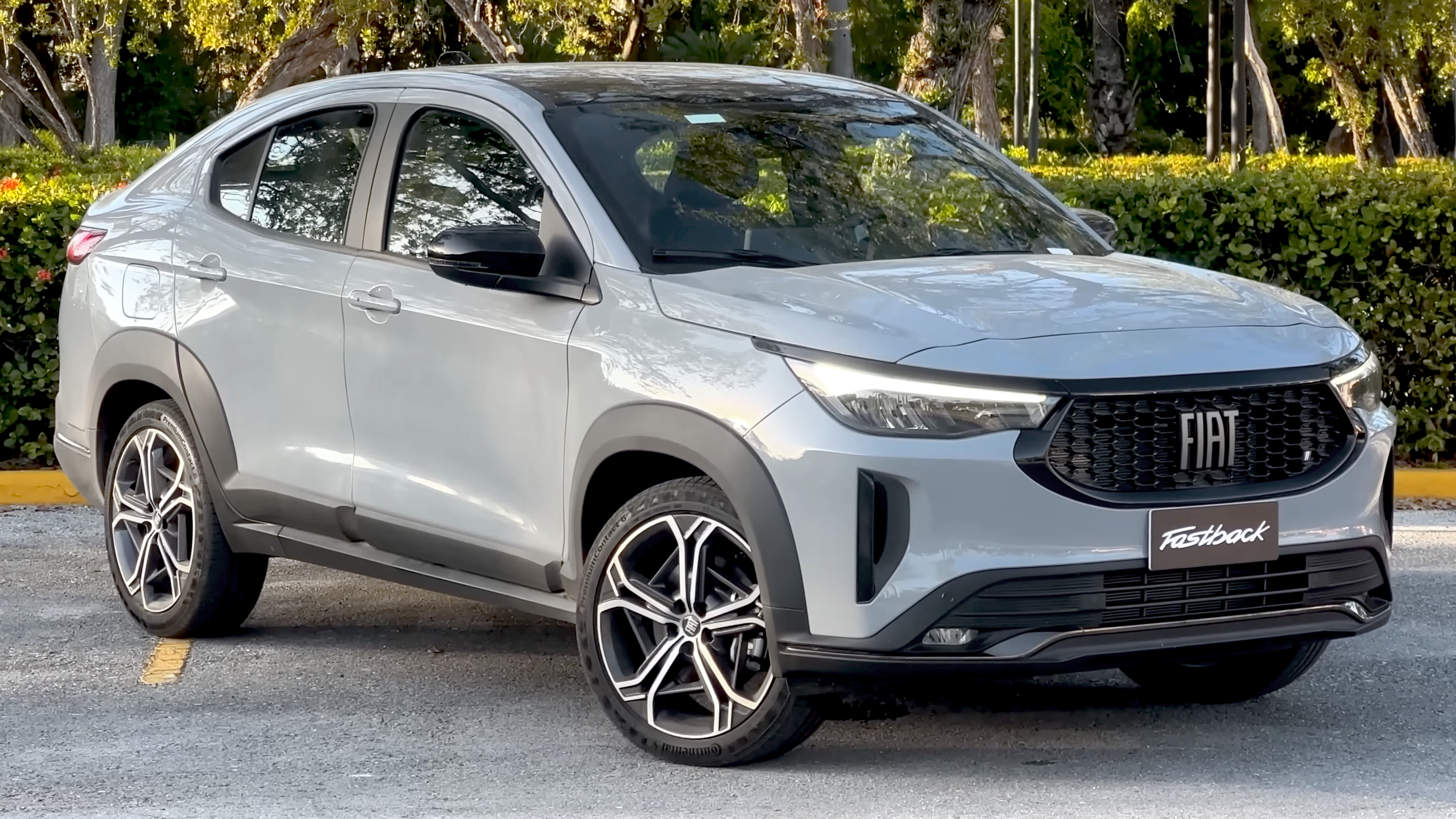
Fiat Fastback

The Fiat Fastback is a coupe SUV variant of the Pulse, which was released in August 2022. In Brazil, it is positioned as a flagship Fiat model only below the imported Fiat 500e. It is available with the 1.0-litre turbocharged and 1.3-litre turbocharged petrol engines. The Fastback nameplate was previously used for a concept coupe SUV based on the Fiat Toro in 2018.

== Sales ==
| Year | Brazil | Argentina | Uruguay | Colombia | Mexico |
|---|---|---|---|---|---|
| 2021 | 6,725 | | | | |
| 2022 | 50,522 | 3,681 | 406 | | 2,575 |
| 2023 | 45,812 | 1,652 | 279 | 557 | |
| 2024 | 39,070 | | | | |
| 2025 | 44,434 | | | | |

== Awards ==
- Car of the Year 2022 – Carro do Ano (Autoesporte, Brazil, 2021).
- Best National Car – Car Awards Brasil (CAR Magazine, Brazil, 2021).
- Best Engine under 2,000 cm^{3} – Carro do Ano (Autoesporte, Brazil, 2021).
- Best Design of Museu da Casa Brasileira (Museu da Casa Brasileira, Brazil, 2021).
- Best Design of Product (Automobiles/Cars) (iF DESIGN AWARD, 2022).
