= Fiat Argo =

Subcompact car produced by Fiat

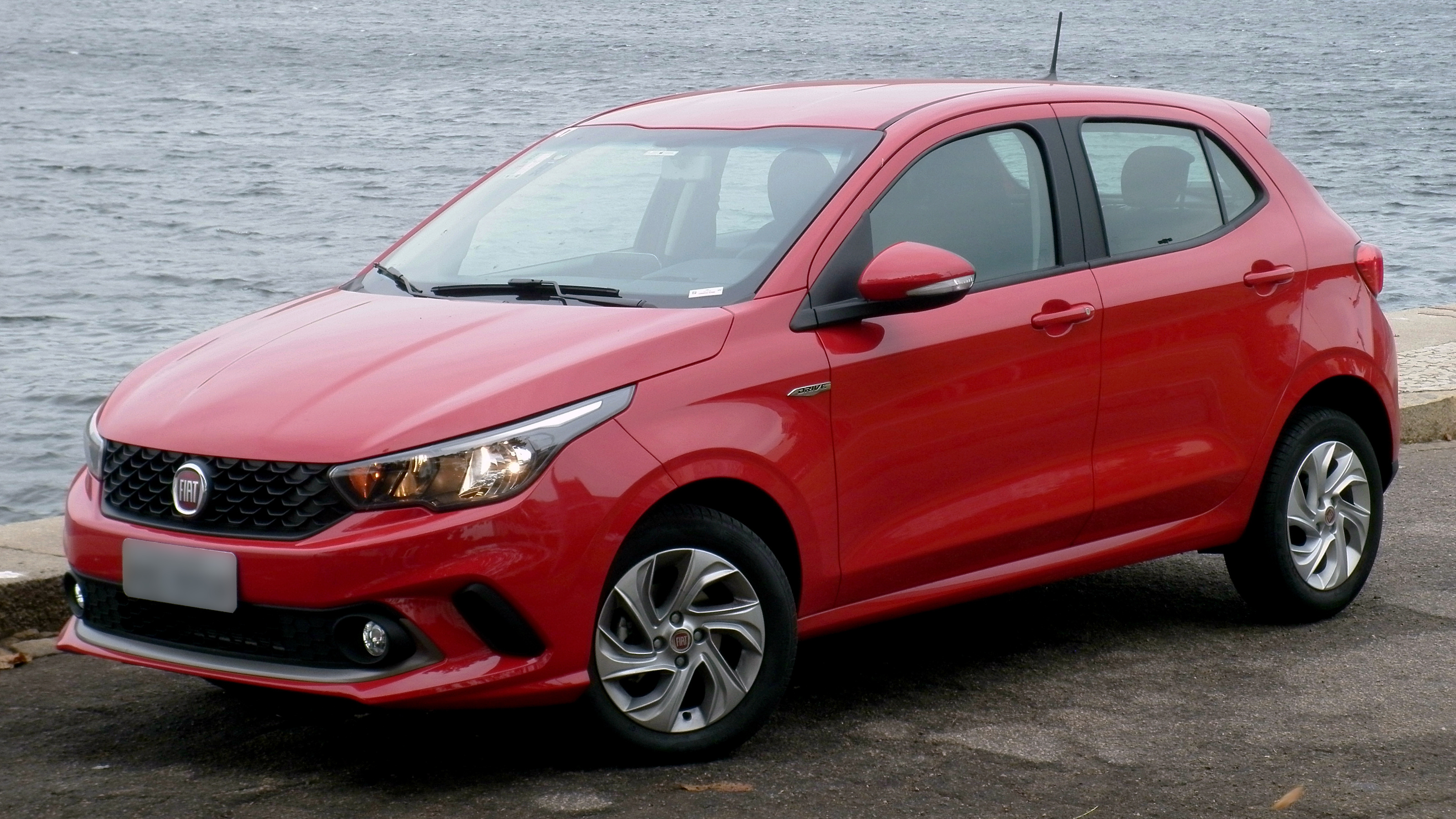
- 2017 Fiat Argo (pre-facelift)

Overview
- Manufacturer: Fiat (Note: Fiat Chrysler Automobiles (2017–2021); Stellantis (2021–present))
- Production: 2017–present
- Assembly: Brazil: Betim, Minas Gerais

Body and chassis
- Class: Subcompact car (B)
- Body style: 5-door hatchback
- Layout: Front-engine, front-wheel-drive
- Platform: MP-1
- Related: Fiat Cronos; Fiat Pulse; Fiat Fastback

Powertrain
- Engine: Petrol: 1.0 L FireFly flex fuel I3; 1.3 L FireFly flex fuel I4; 1.8 L E.torQ flex fuel I4

Dimensions
- Wheelbase: 2,521 mm (99.3 in)
- Length: 4,000 mm (157.5 in)
- Width: 1,750 mm (68.9 in)
- Height: 1,505 mm (59.3 in)
- Curb weight: 1,105–1,279 kg (2,436–2,820 lb)

Chronology
- Predecessor: Fiat Palio; Fiat Punto
- Successor: Fiat Argo X

The Fiat Argo (Type 358, codeproject X6H) is a subcompact car (B-segment) by the Italian manufacturer Fiat, developed for the market in South America. A sedan version was launched in 2018, with the name Fiat Cronos.

== Overview ==
It was presented in Brazil in May 2017, being sold as of June. It is a five-door hatchback that replaced the Fiat Punto and the Fiat Palio. The Argo was presented a year later than planned, and was developed to strengthen Fiat's offering in the subcompact (B) segment, traditionally an important one for Fiat.

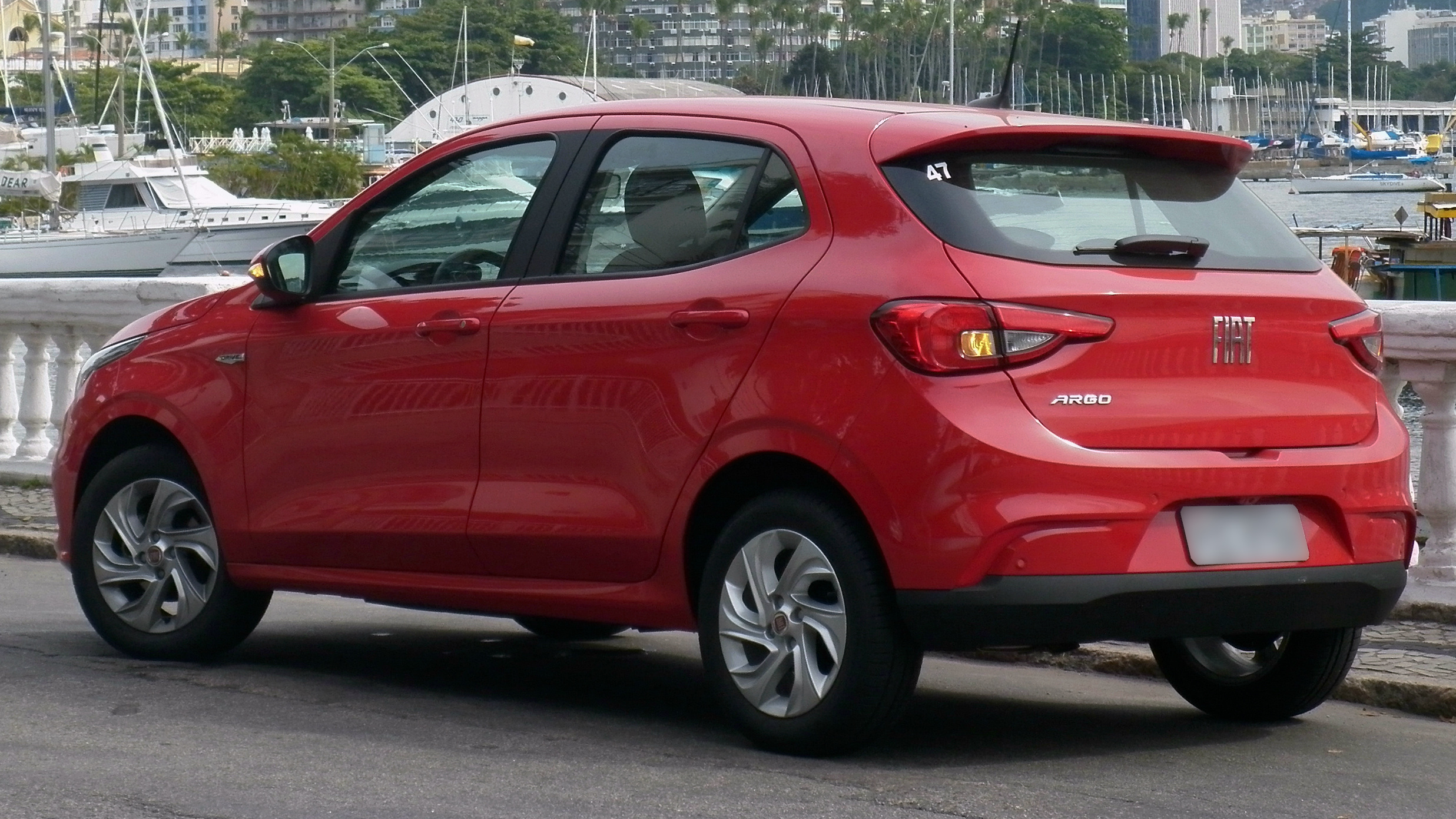
Rear view (pre-facelift)

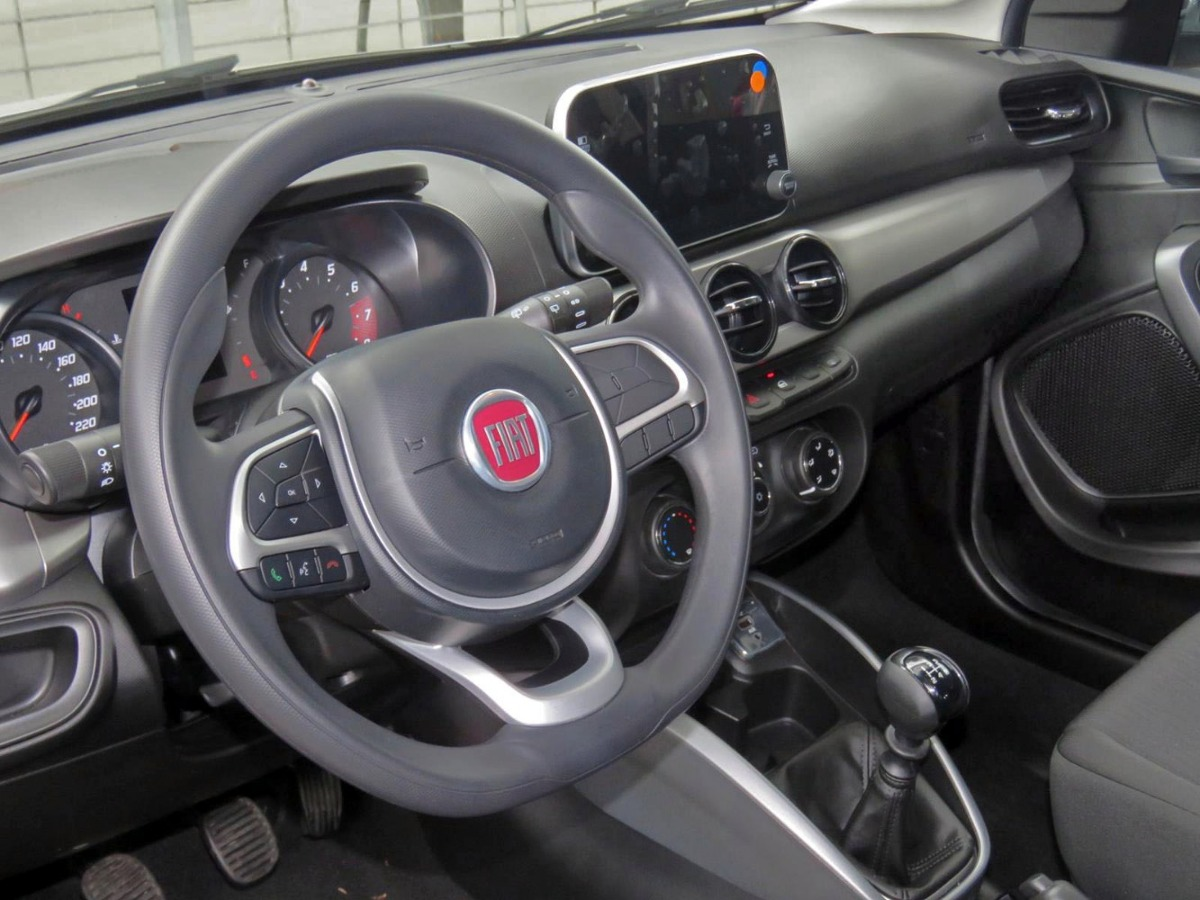
Interior (pre-facelift)

=== Fiat Argo Trekking ===
The Argo Trekking is a crossover-styled version of the Argo hatchback, introduced in 2019, featuring raised suspension, roof rails, black roof and mirror caps, protective body cladding, and a more rugged, appearance overall.

2020 Argo Trekking (Uruguay)

2020 Argo Trekking (Uruguay)

=== Facelift ===
2025 Argo Drive (facelift)

The Argo received a facelift in late July 2022, featuring a redesigned front bumper and grille, new alloy wheels and hubcaps, a revised steering wheel, and updated interior trim.

== Powertrain ==
The three-cylinder, 1.0-litre version of the Firefly engine is exclusive to the Brazilian local market, where sub-litre engines benefit from lower taxation, while the available 1.3-litre engine is standard elsewhere. At the launch, the 1.3 was available with the option for an automated-manual transmission named GSR, which was phased out in 2019, while the 1.8L E.torQ has retained the availability of an automatic transmission. For the Trekking trim released in 2019, the 1.3 is the base engine and the 1.8 is offered only with the automatic transmission. All engines are flexfuel for Brazil, and gasoline only elsewhere.

== Safety ==
The Argo has front ventilated disc brakes.

The Argo in its most basic Latin American version with 2 airbags and no Electronic stability control received 0 stars for adult occupants and 4 stars for infants from Latin NCAP 2.0 in 2019.

Latin NCAP 2.0 test results Fiat Argo / Cronos + 2 Airbags (2019, based on Euro NCAP 2008)
Test	Points	Stars
Adult occupant:	24.41/34.0	0 /5 stars
Child occupant:	37.47/49.00	4 /5 stars

The Argo (tested as the sedan variant, the Cronos) in its 2 airbag configuration received 0 stars from Latin NCAP 3.0 at its December 2021 test.

Latin NCAP 3.0 test results Fiat Argo / Cronos + 2 Airbags (2021, similar to Euro NCAP 2014)
Test	Points	%
Overall:	0 /5 stars	
Adult occupant:	9.74	24%
Child occupant:	4.86	10%
Pedestrian:	17.72	37%
Safety assist:	3.00	7%

== Sales ==
Year	Brazil	Argentina	Mexico
2017	27,925	1,636	—N/a
2018	63,017	21,378	—N/a
2019	79,001	8,865	—N/a
2020	65,937	4,688	328
2021	84,656	1,248	2,516
2022	64,022	1,517	1,983
2023	66,720		1,848
2024	91,133		2,073
2025	102,639		
