= Fiat Cronos =

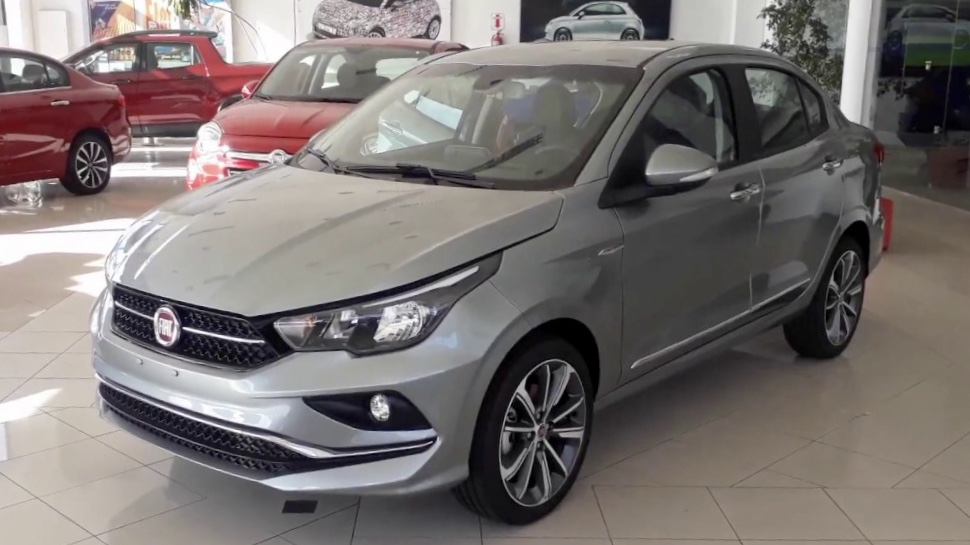
- 2018 Fiat Cronos 1.8 (pre-facelift)

Overview
- Manufacturer: FCA (2018–2021); Stellantis (2021–present)
- Production: 2018–present
- Assembly: Argentina: Ferreyra, Córdoba

Body and chassis
- Class: Subcompact car
- Body style: 4-door sedan
- Layout: Front-engine, front-wheel-drive
- Platform: Small MP-S
- Related: Fiat Argo; Fiat Pulse; Fiat Fastback

Powertrain
- Engine: Flex fuel (petrol): 1.0 L FireFly I3; 1.3 L FireFly I4; 1.8 L E.torQ I4
- Transmission: 5-speed FPT C510 manual 5-speed FPT C510 GSR automated manual 6-speed Aisin AW60T automatic CVT

Dimensions
- Wheelbase: 2,521 mm (99.3 in)
- Length: 4,364 mm (171.8 in)
- Width: 1,724 mm (67.9 in)
- Height: 1,516 mm (59.7 in)

Chronology
- Predecessor: Fiat Siena; Fiat Linea

The Fiat Cronos (Type 358S) is a subcompact car released in February 2018 by the Italian automaker Fiat. It is a sedan for the Latin American market based on the Argo hatchback.

== Overview ==
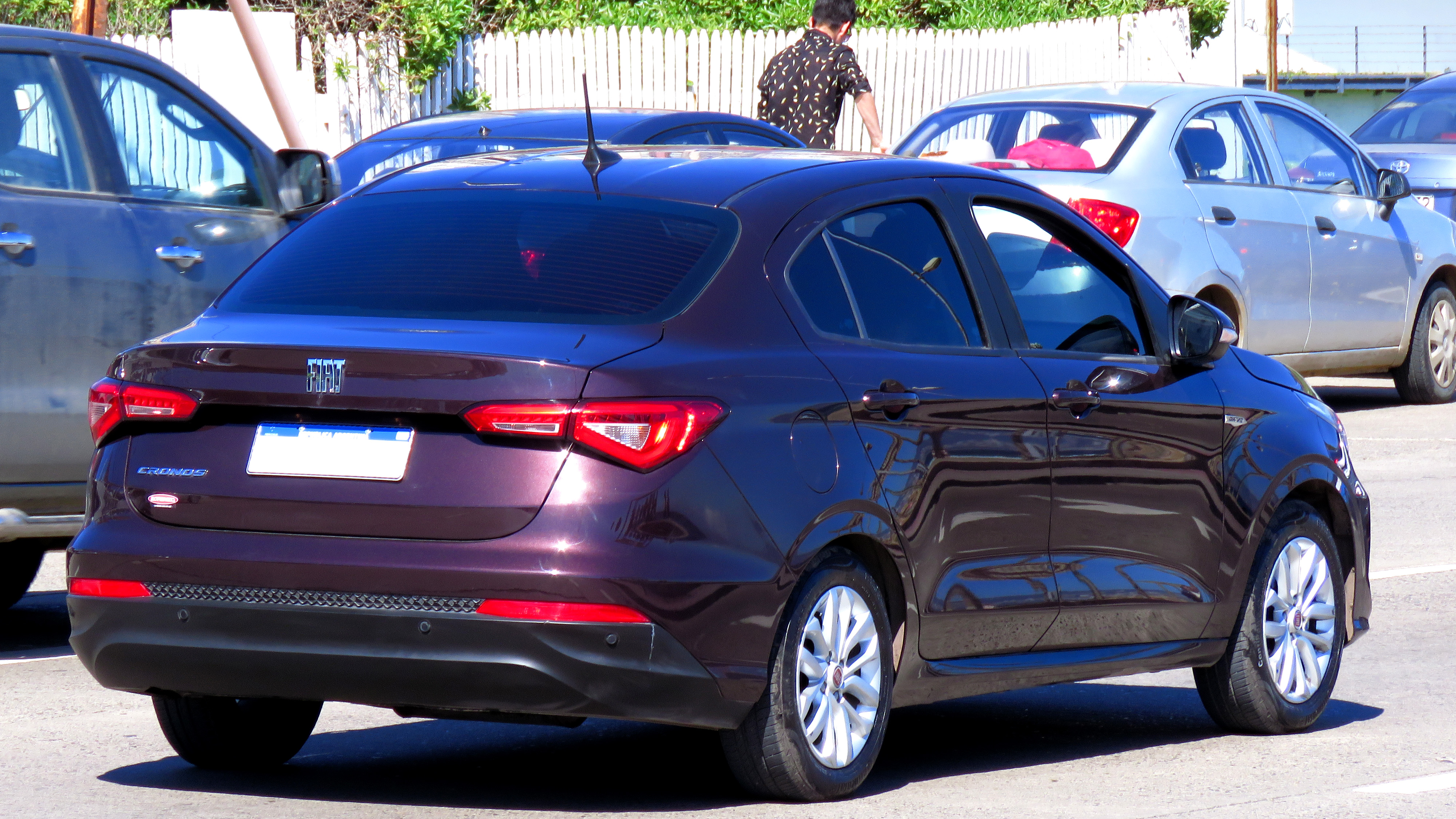
Rear view (pre-facelift)

Unveiled in February 2018, the Cronos was developed as a three-box sedan version of the Argo subcompact hatchback. It takes part of the front platform, the interior, and the front doors from the Argo; altogether, about 30 percent of the components are derived from the Argo. The remaining 70 percent are specific to the Cronos, like the bonnet, front crosspieces, front and rear subframe, bumper, rear axle and skeleton of the body. During the design phase, the car was developed under the codename Type X6S.

In April 2016, the Cronos was officially announced by the CEO of Fiat Chrysler Automobiles, Sergio Marchionne. During the announcement event, he illustrated an investment plan of $500 million for an FCA plant in Córdoba, Argentina. He anticipated total annual production of 100,000 units at full capacity. In 2018, the plant was the subject of an episode of Megafábricas from Nat Geo.

The car, which entered production in February 2018, went on sale in Brazil and Argentina that month. Within the Fiat range, in the Latin American market, it replaces three models: the Siena Fire, the Grand Siena and the Linea. Based on the new MP-S (Modular Platform Sedan) platform, it uses McPherson suspension in the front with a stabilizer bar. In the rear, a torsion beam system is adopted.

The car has been developed by the R&D FCA Brazil center for the South American market only and is not marketed in Europe. The Cronos offers a luggage compartment with a capacity of 525 liters. The interior is shared with the Argo, and uses the UConnect Touch 7" multimedia system.

The engine range consists of the new biofuel (petrol/ ethanol) 1.3-litre 16V GSE Firefly inline-four engine capable of delivering 99 horsepower in ethanol power supply and the 1.8-litre 16V E.torQ inline four engine 130 horsepower. The 1.3-litre engine is combined with a five-speed manual gearbox or a GSR automated manual (evolution of the Dualogic) always five speed, while the 1.8-litre is combined with a five speed manual or six speed automatic Aisin AW60T.

In June 2022 (concurrent with the facelift), Fiat announced the discontinuation of the 1.8 16v engine, which was already discontinued in Brazil since early 2022 when the PROCONVE L7 emissions standard became mandatory.

In 2022, it was the most localized passenger car in Argentina, with 48% of its parts being made in the country. As of 2022, 57% of its production is exported and over 250,000 units have been made (over 80,000 expected for 2022).

As of June 2024, 400,000 units have been made.

== 2022 facelift ==
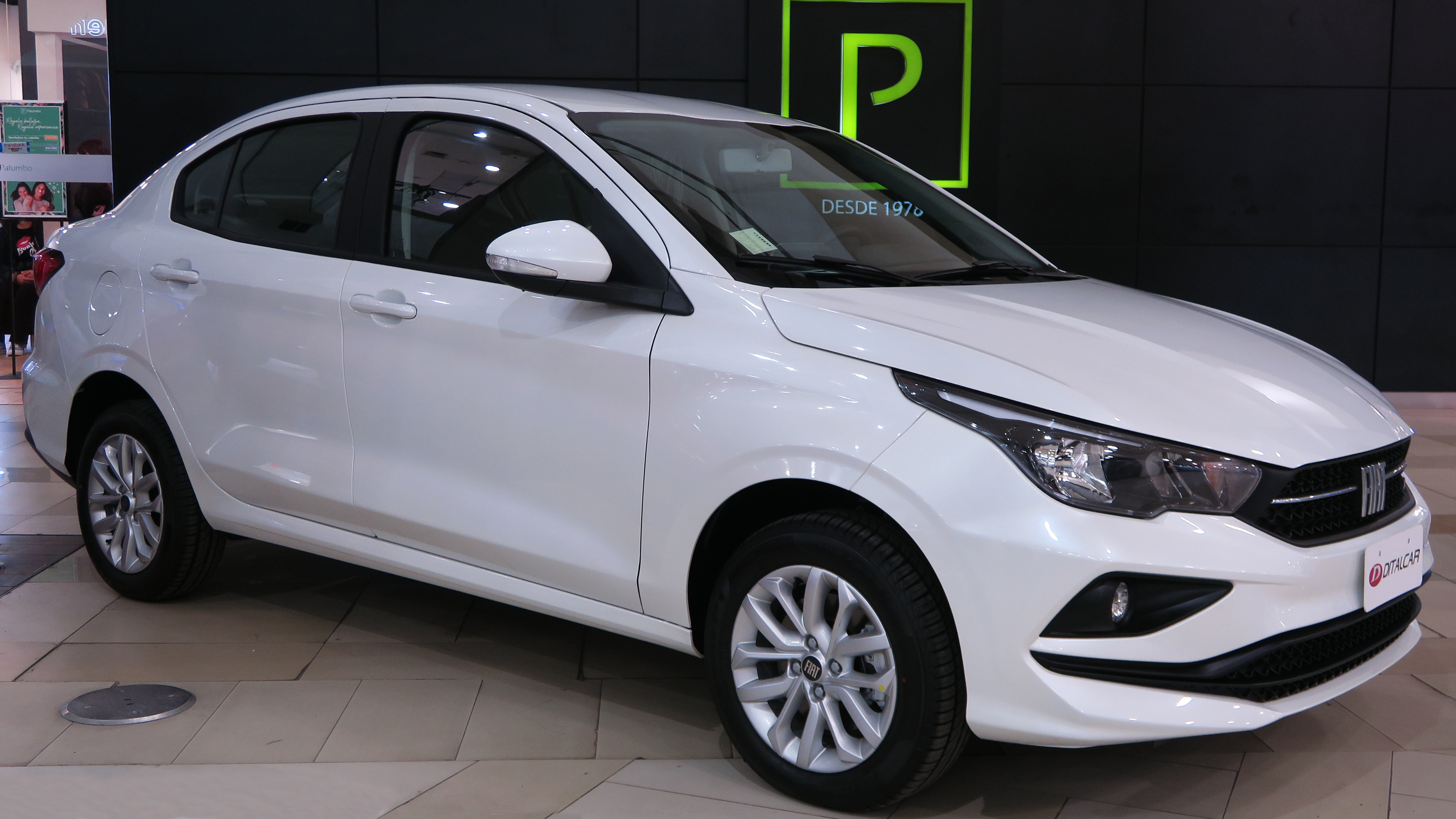
2022 Cronos 1.8 Drive (first facelift)

In late July 2022, the Fiat Cronos received a facelift featuring a revised front grille with new Fiat badges, updated interior trim, a 1.0-litre petrol engine option, and an optional CVT transmission.

== 2025 facelift ==
2025 Cronos (second facelift)

In April 2025, the Cronos received a facelift featuring a redesigned front grille with vertical bars, revised front and rear bumpers, updated LED lighting with integrated daytime running lights, and new alloy-wheel designs; the range was reduced to four versions, and wireless Apple CarPlay and Android Auto were added on higher trims, while retaining the 1.3-litre GSE engine with 99 hp and a five-speed manual or CVT transmission.

== Safety ==
The Cronos has front ventilated disc brakes.

The Cronos in its most basic Latin American version with 2 airbags and no Electronic stability control received 0 stars for adult occupants and 4 stars for infants from Latin NCAP 2.0 in 2019.

Latin NCAP 2.0 test results Fiat Argo / Cronos + 2 Airbags (2019, based on Euro NCAP 2008)
Test	Points	Stars
Adult occupant:	24.41/34.0	0 /5 stars
Child occupant:	37.47/49.00	4 /5 stars

In 2021, the most basic Latin American version with two airbags, airbag switch, and no ESC received 0 stars from Latin NCAP under the new protocol (similar to Euro NCAP 2014).

Latin NCAP 3.0 test results Fiat Argo / Cronos + 2 Airbags (2021, similar to Euro NCAP 2014)
Test	Points	%
Overall:	0 /5 stars	
Adult occupant:	9.74	24%
Child occupant:	4.86	10%
Pedestrian:	17.72	37%
Safety assist:	3.00	7%

In 2022, the four airbag option was discontinued.

== Sales ==
Year	Brazil	Argentina
2018	29,307	11,601
2019	24,080	11,048
2020	16,167	16,558
2021	27,890	37,449
2022	41,683	38,769
2023	50,760	47,580
2024	44,388	28,032
2025	26,552	29,905

In 2020, the Cronos was the second best-selling passenger car in Argentina, and later became the best-selling passenger car in the country in 2021, and 2022.
