= GGSE =

GGSE may refer to:

- Gravity-gradient stabilization, a method of stabilizing artificial satellites
- GGSE-1, a technology satellite launched by the US military in 1964
- Gevirtz Graduate School of Education, University of California at Santa Barbara

== See also ==
- GSE (disambiguation)
