= ESG =

ESG may refer to:

== Groups ==
- Election Support Group, an internationally sponsored organization analyzing and supporting the electoral process in Pakistan
- ES Guelma, an Algerian football club based in Guelma
- Escuela Superior de Guerra (Argentina), the university and staff college of the Armed Forces of the Argentine Republic
- Expeditionary strike group, a United States Navy concept based on the Naval Expeditionary Task Force
- Experimental Study Group, a freshman learning community at the Massachusetts Institute of Technology
- Galician Socialist Space (Galician: Espazo Socialista Galego), a Galician political party

=== Companies ===
- Elektroniksystem- und Logistik-GmbH, a limited liability company founded in 1967 in Munich
- Engineering Seismology Group (ESG) Solutions, a geophysical products and services company
- Endemol Shine Group, a former Dutch media company

== Music ==
- E.S.G. (rapper) (born 1973), American rapper from Houston, Texas
- ESG (band), an American funk rock band
  - ESG (EP), their debut EP

== Other ==
- Environmental, social, and governance approaches to investing, which evaluate a corporation's social and environmental impacts
- Earth system governance – Field of scholarly inquiry in the social sciences
- Earth System Governance Project, an international, interdisciplinary research initiative started in 2009
- Dr. Luis María Argaña International Airport (IATA code: ESG), an airport serving Mariscal Estigarribia in Paraguay
- Earth System Grid, a data distribution portal funded mainly by the United States Department of Energy
- Elizabeth Street Garden, a one-acre community sculpture garden in the Nolita neighborhood of Manhattan, New York City
- Gondi language (ISO 639-3 subcode: esg), a South-Central Dravidian language, spoken by about three million Gondi people
- TLE1 (also ESG), a protein that in humans is encoded by the TLE1 gene
