= Citroën Basalt =

Subcompact crossover SUV

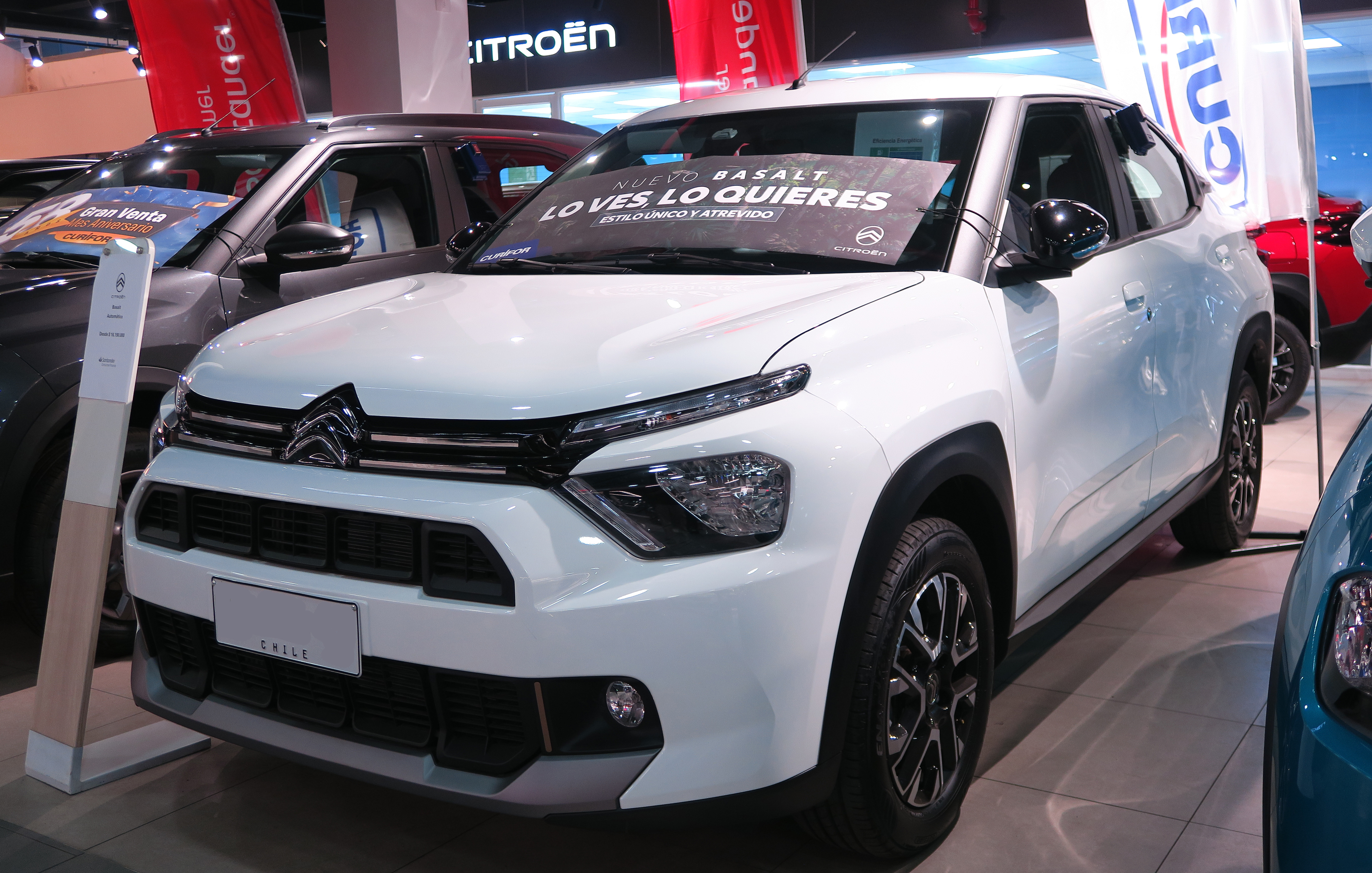

Overview
- Manufacturer: Citroën
- Model code: CC26
- Production: 2024–present
- Assembly: India: Tiruvallur (Citroën India); Brazil: Porto Real (Stellantis do Brasil)
- Designer: Antoine Gaillot-Drevon

Body and chassis
- Class: Subcompact crossover SUV
- Body style: 5-door coupe SUV
- Layout: Front-engine, front-wheel-drive
- Platform: Smart Car Platform
- Related: Citroën C3 (CC21); Citroën C3 Aircross (CC24); Fiat Grizzly Fastback / Chrysler Arrow

Powertrain
- Engine: Petrol: 1.0 L FireFly I3 flex fuel; 1.3 L FireFly I4; 1.0 L FireFly turbo I3 flex fuel; 1.2 L EB2DT turbo I3
- Transmission: 5-speed manual 6-speed manual 6-speed automatic

Dimensions
- Wheelbase: 2,670 mm (105.1 in)
- Length: 4,300 mm (169.3 in)

The Citroën Basalt is a subcompact crossover SUV developed for emerging markets such as India and South America.

The design was previewed by the "Basalt Vision" concept car, presented in March 2024. The production model was unveiled on 2 August 2024, with teaser images being published early in July.

== Markets ==
=== Brazil ===
The Basalt was launched in Brazil on 2 October 2024, with three trim levels: Feel, Shine and First Edition. Two engine options are available: a 1.0-litre petrol and a 1.0-litre turbocharged petrol. At the time of its introduction, the Basalt was the cheapest SUV on sale in Brazil.

The same month, Citroën introduces a second concept car based on the Basalt named Citroën Basalt Vision Dark Concept. It has a black paintwork with some red elements, referencing the Citroën GS Basalte.

In November 2025, a third concept car is introduced, it is again named Citroën Basalt Vision Concept, but with a sportier look than the March 2024 version.

=== India ===
The Basalt was launched in India on 30 August 2024, with three trim levels: You, Plus and Max. Two engine options are available: a 1.2-litre petrol and a 1.2-litre turbocharged petrol.

=== Indonesia ===
The Basalt was launched on 24 July 2025 at the 32nd Gaikindo Indonesia International Auto Show. Imported from India, it was available with two variants: Standard and Dark Edition, both variants are powered by the 1.2-litre turbocharged petrol engine.

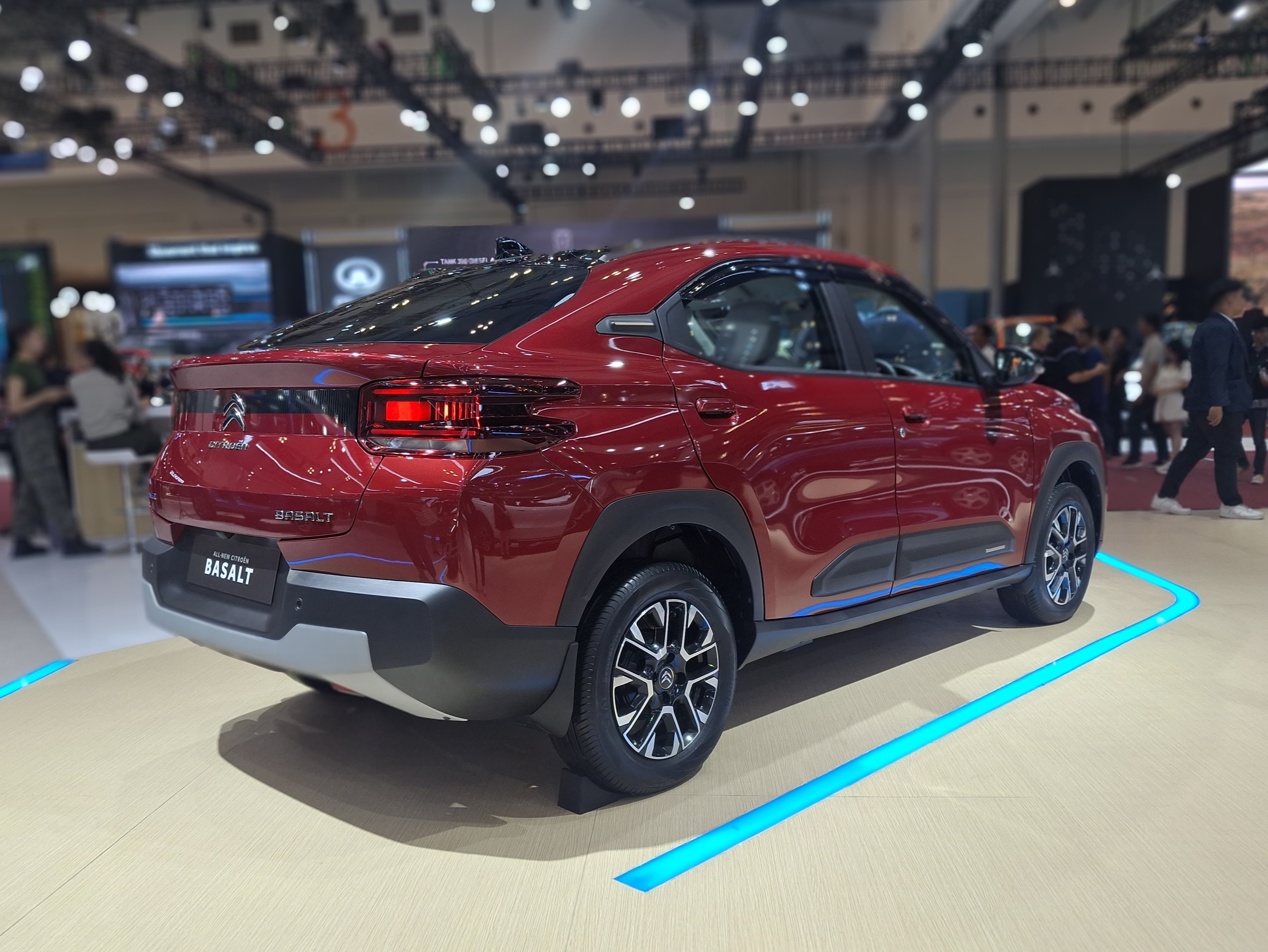
Rear view (Indonesia)

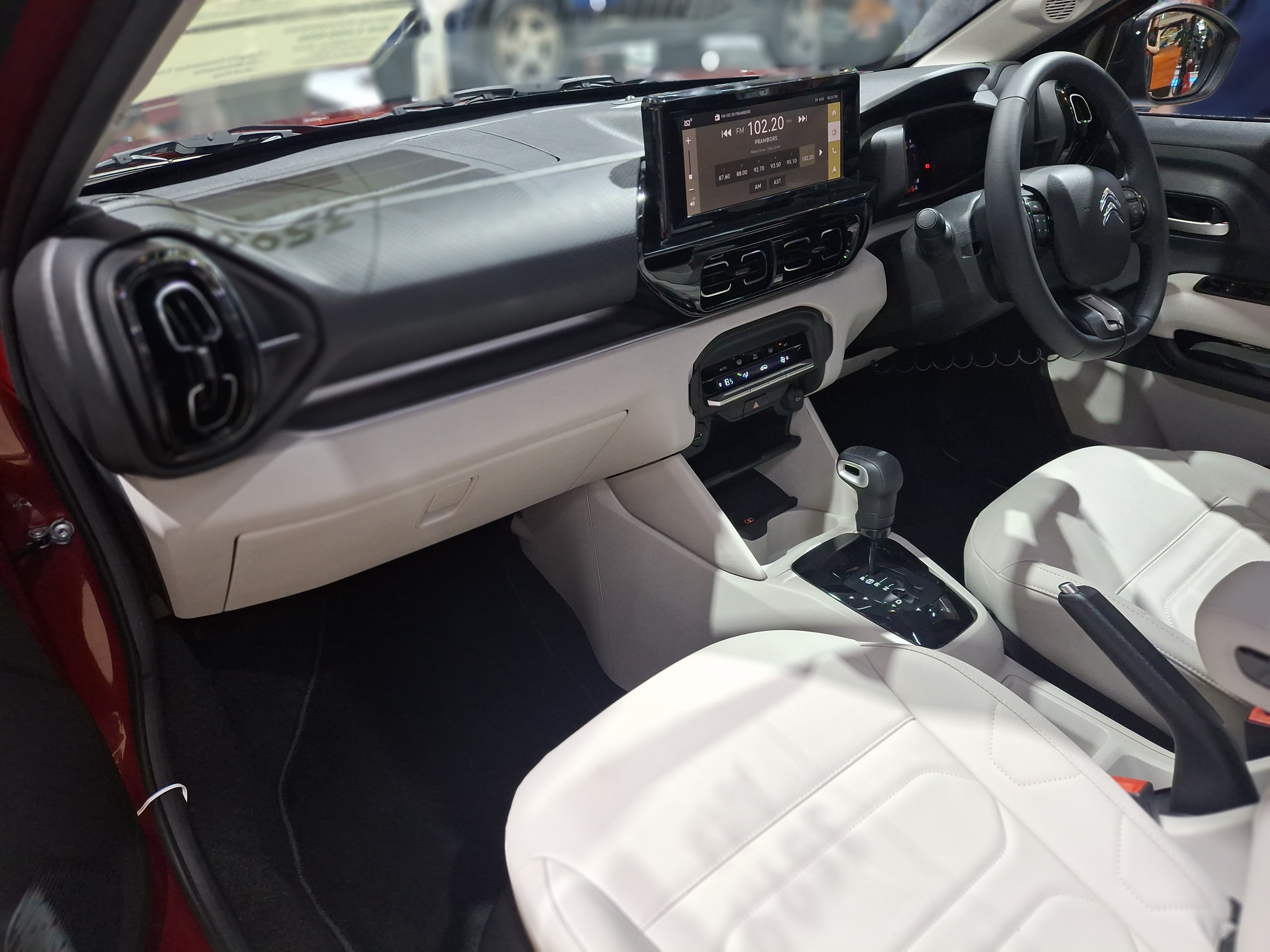
Interior (Indonesia)

=== South Africa ===
The Basalt went on sale in South Africa on 10 March 2026, with two grades: Plus and Max, powered by the 1.2-litre turbocharged petrol engine. All variants are fully imported from India.

== Safety ==
=== Bharat NCAP ===
In 2024, the Basalt for India received 4 stars for adult occupants and 4 stars for toddlers from Bharat NCAP (based on Latin NCAP 2016).

Bharat NCAP test results Citroen Basalt (2024, based on Latin NCAP 2016)
Test	Score	Stars
Adult occupant protection	26.19/32.00	4 /5 stars
Child occupant protection	35.90/49.00	4 /5 stars

=== Latin NCAP ===
In 2025, the Basalt for Latin America with 4 airbags and no ADAS received 0 stars from Latin NCAP 3.0 (similar to Euro NCAP 2014).

Latin NCAP 3.5 test results Citroen Basalt + 4 Airbags (2025, similar to Euro NCAP 2017)
Test	Points	%
Overall:	0 /5 stars	
Adult occupant:	15.75	39%
Child occupant:	28.59	58%
Pedestrian:	25.65	53%
Safety assist:	15.00	35%

== Sales ==
Year	Brazil	Argentina	Uruguay
2024	2,320		/
2025	19,793	6,543	437
