= Fiat Fastback =

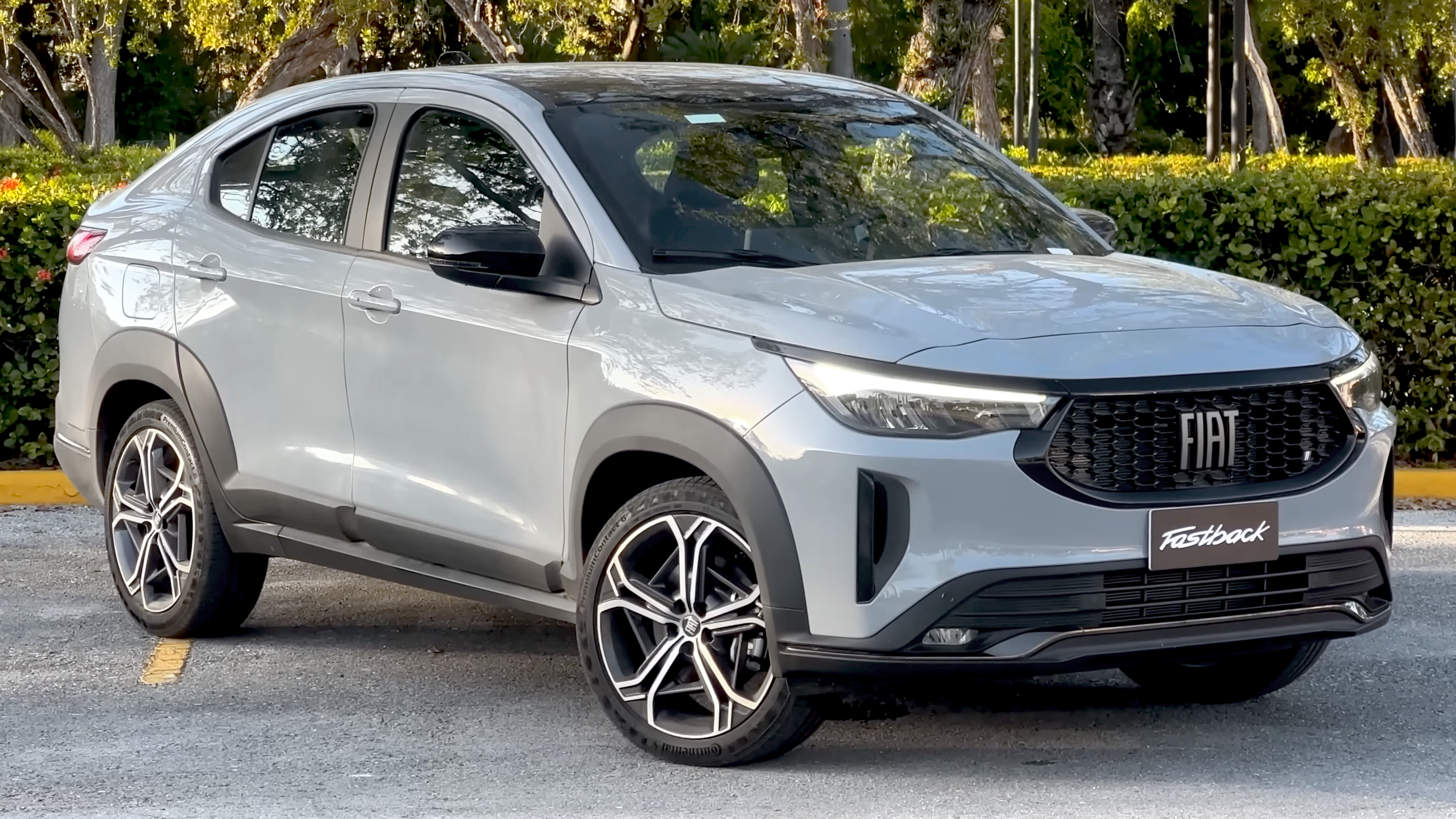
- 2023 Fiat Fastback (pre-facelift)

Overview
- Manufacturer: Fiat (Stellantis)
- Also called: Abarth Fastback
- Production: October 2022 – present
- Assembly: Brazil: Betim, Minas Gerais

Body and chassis
- Class: Compact crossover SUV (C)
- Body style: 5-door coupe SUV
- Layout: Front-engine, front-wheel-drive
- Platform: MLA
- Related: Fiat Pulse; Fiat Argo; Fiat Cronos

Powertrain
- Engine: Petrol: 1.0 L GSE FireFly I3 flex fuel turbo; 1.3 L GSE FireFly I4 flex fuel turbo
- Transmission: 6-speed automatic; CVT

Dimensions
- Wheelbase: 2,532 mm (99.7 in)
- Length: 4,427 mm (174.3 in)
- Width: 1,774 mm (69.8 in)
- Height: 1,545 mm (60.8 in)
- Kerb weight: 1,253–1,304 kg (2,762–2,875 lb)

The Fiat Fastback is a compact crossover SUV produced by Fiat mainly for the South American market, which was released in August 2022.

== Overview ==
The Fastback is the coupe SUV version of the Fiat Pulse and is based on the same MLA platform. In Brazil, it is positioned as a flagship Fiat model only below the imported Fiat 500e. It is available with 1.0-litre turbocharged and 1.3-litre turbocharged petrol engines. The Fastback nameplate was previously used for a concept coupe SUV based on the Fiat Toro in 2018.

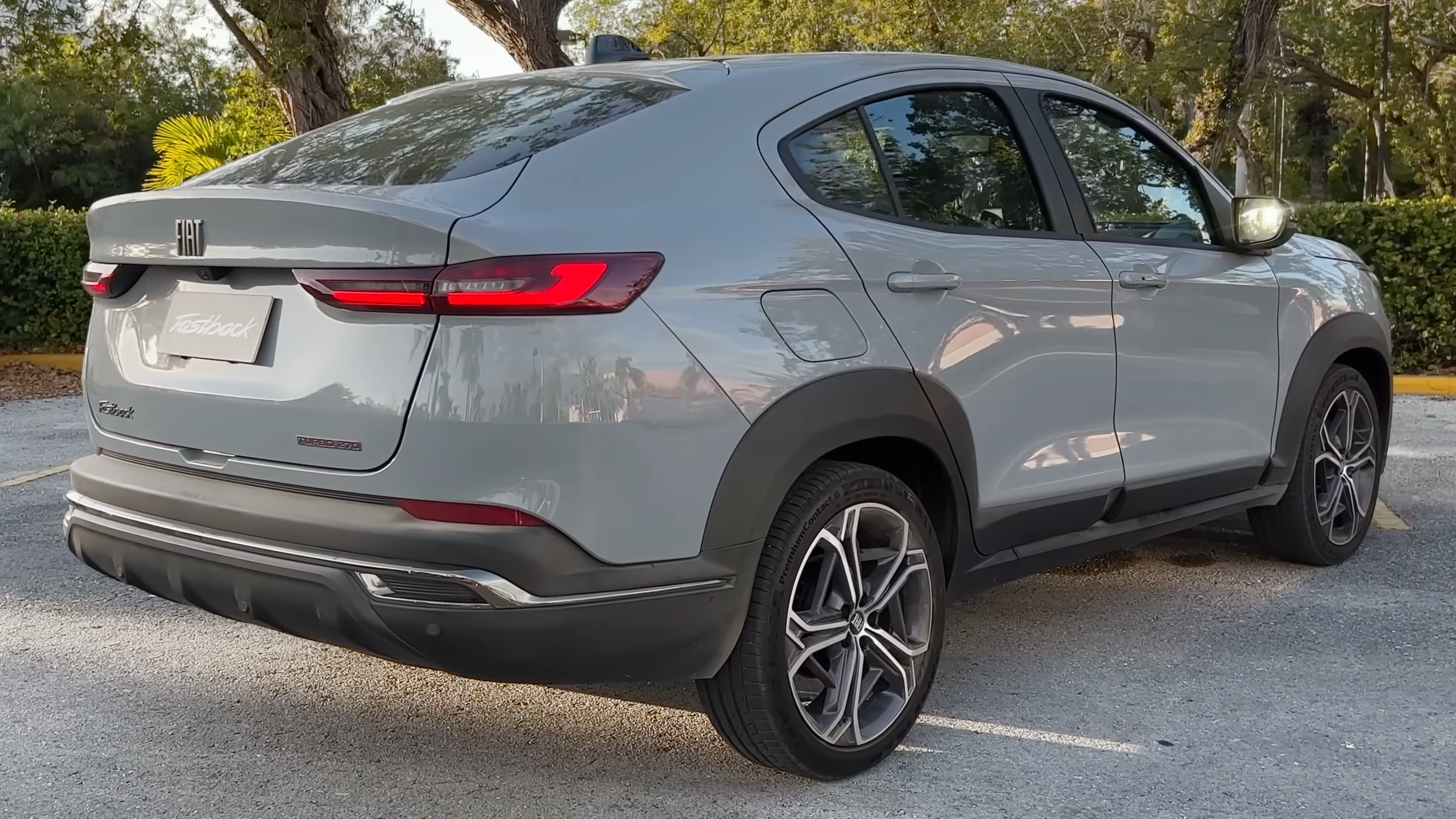
Rear view (pre-facelift)

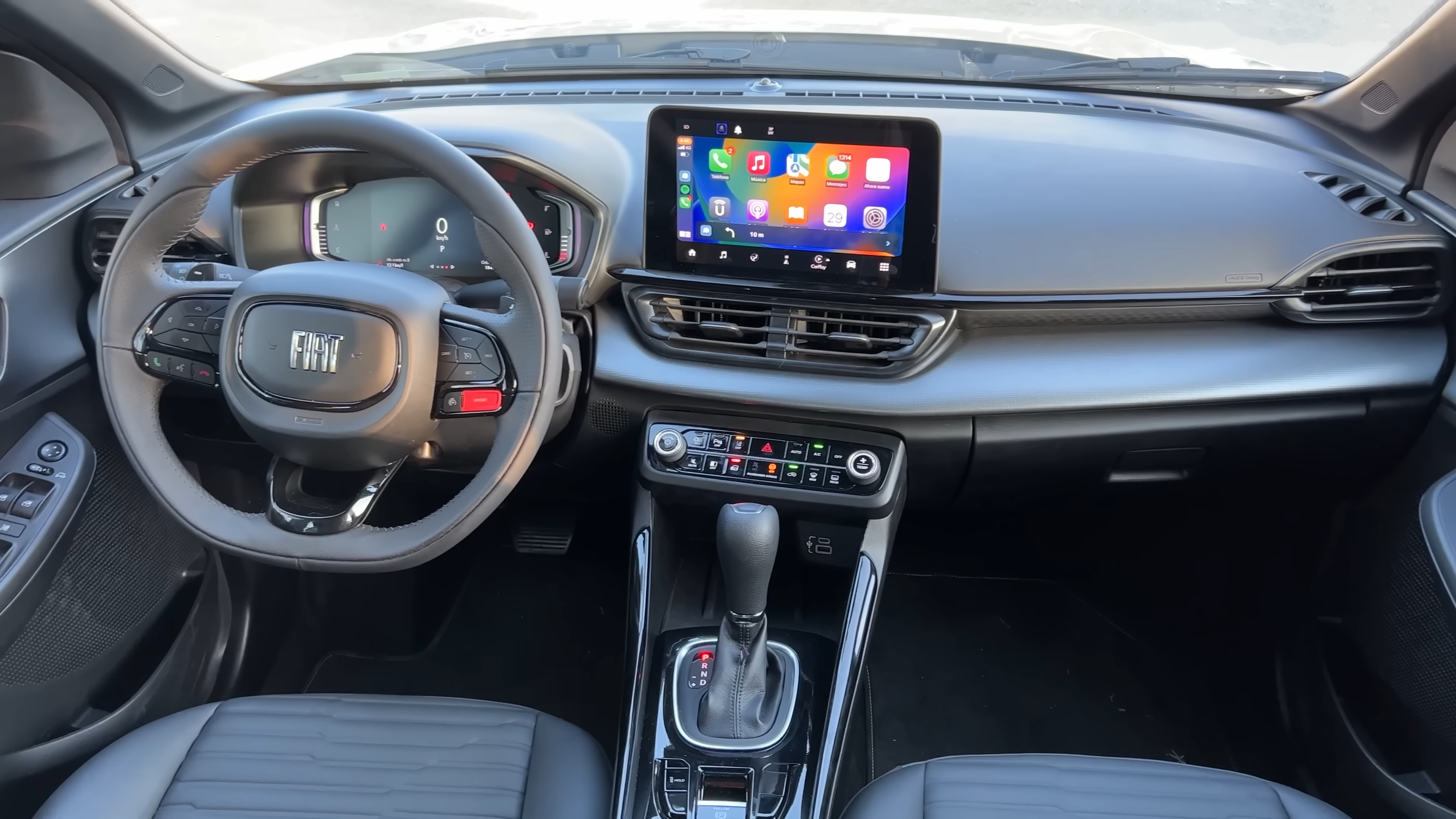
Interior (pre-facelift)

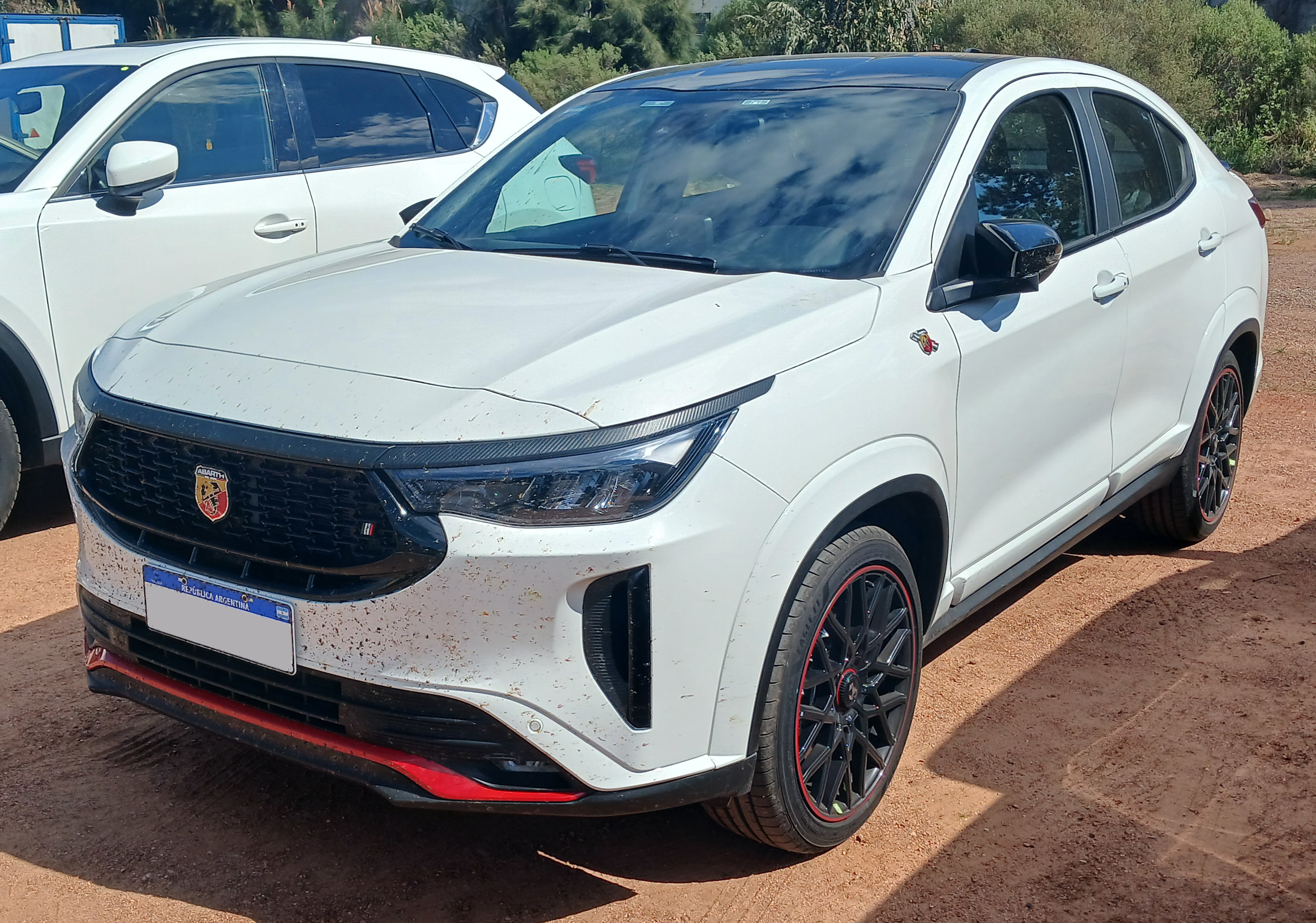
2024 Abarth Fastback (pre-facelift)

Abarth Fastback rear (pre-facelift)

== 2025 facelift ==
The Fiat Fastback received a facelift on 28 June 2025 for the 2026 model year, introducing a redesigned front fascia with a new grille and vertical styling elements, revised exterior details, updated wheels, and enhanced comfort and technology features, while retaining its range of turbocharged petrol and hybrid powertrains.

2026 Fastback Turbo (facelift)

2026 Abarth Fastback (facelift)

== Engines ==
Engine code	Number of cylinders, valves	Displacement Bore x stroke	Trims	Peak power (ethanol)	Peak torque (ethanol)
T200	Inline-3, 12 valves Turbo, Multiair III	1.0 L; 61.0 cu in (999 cc); 70 mm × 86.5 mm (2.76 in × 3.41 in)	T200, Audace, Impetus	130 PS (96 kW; 128 hp) at 5750 rpm on E100 125 PS (92 kW; 123 hp) at 5750 rpm on gasoline	200 N⋅m (148 lb⋅ft) at 1750 rpm on E100 or gasoline
T270	Inline-4, 16 valves Turbo, Multiair III	1.3 L; 81.3 cu in (1,332 cc); 70 mm × 86.5 mm (2.76 in × 3.41 in)	Limited Edition by Abarth	185 PS (136 kW; 182 hp) at 5750 rpm on E100 182 PS (134 kW; 180 hp) at 5750 rpm on gasoline	270 N⋅m (199 lb⋅ft) at 1750 rpm on E100 or gasoline

== Safety ==
The Fastback comes with 4 airbags, LED lighting, automatic high beam, tire pressure monitoring system, hill holder, traction control system, ESC, lane departure warning system, front ventilated disc brakes, ABS with EBD, ESS, and collision avoidance system. Cornering fog lights are optional.

== Sales ==
Year	Brazil
2022	9,892
2023	40,408
2024	48,222
2025	57,305
