= Georgian State Electrosystem =

Single Electricity Transmission System Operator in Georgia

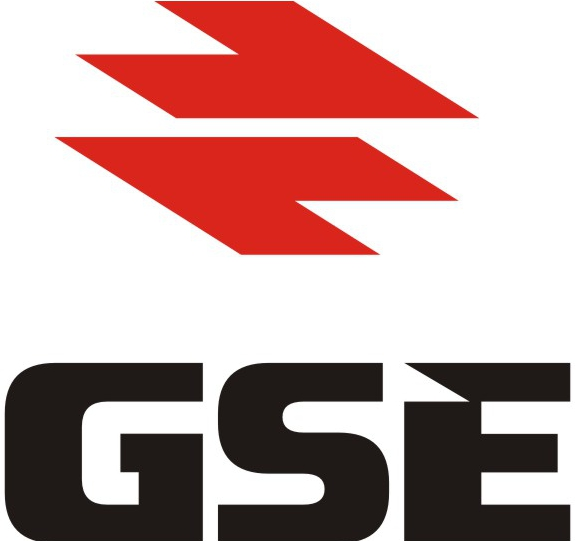
- Type: Joint Stock Company
- Industry: Energy
- Founded: 2002
- Headquarters: Tbilisi, Georgia
- Area served: Global
- Number of employees: 1400
- Website: www.gse.com.ge https://www.facebook.com/electrosystema/

Georgian State Electrosystem (GSE) is the single Electricity Transmission System Operator (TSO) acting in Georgia, providing the overall coordination of the country's electricity system. As the single TSO, GSE is responsible for balancing the country's power supply and demand in real time.

Transmission network is managed by the National Dispatch Center and its technical maintenance is provided by the 3 regional networks (Eastern, Western and Southern). GSE also manages the cross-border transmission lines interconnecting with neighboring countries Russia, Turkey, Armenia and Azerbaijan.

== General Information ==
GSE is a joint stock company owned by the LEPL National Agency of State Property, while its management rights are transferred to the Ministry of Economy and Sustainable Development of Georgia.

GSE provides power transmission and dispatch services all over the country. Transmission is provided from hydro, thermal and wind power plants to power distribution companies and direct customers.

To perform repairs, the company implements the scheduled outages of system-wide transmission lines and substations, and temporarily restricts the power supply if necessary. The company develops relay protection schemes and analyzes accidents within the network. To use energy resources optimally, the National Dispatch Centre located at GSE headquarters in Tbilisi coordinates the activities of electricity market participants. It also manages the transmission network in standard and emergency situations.

== History ==
JSC Georgian State Electrosystem was established in 2002 through the merger of Electrodispetcherizatsia Ltd. and JSC Elektrogadatsema. Since December 2002, GSE management has been carried out by the Irish company ESB International which had acquired the company 5-year management right in the tender “Wholesale Electricity Market Support Project” announced by the World Bank. In 2007, after the completion of the project, the management of GSE was transferred to the Georgian board of directors.

The Director General of the company is David Vardiashvili.

== See also ==
- Energy in Georgia (Country)
