= SGE =

SGE may refer to:

- Sagitta, a constellation
- SGE, acronym of The School for Good and Evil, a book series
- SGE, IATA code for Siegerland Airport, Burbach, North Rhine-Westphalia, Germany
- Sigma Gamma Epsilon, honor society in earth sciences
- Sun Grid Engine, in computing, an open source batch-queuing system
- GM small gasoline engine, a family of engines produced by General Motors
- Sportgemeinde Eintracht, former name of Eintracht Frankfurt, a sports club and football team in Frankfurt, Hesse, Germany
- Sehr gut erhalten ("preserved very good"), German form of the "Very Good" coin grade
- Stitch's Great Escape!, a defunct theme park attraction at Magic Kingdom in Walt Disney World
- Search Generative Experience, a feature in Google Search which provides AI-generated summaries to search prompts
- Special government employee, in the U.S. government
- Singapore English
