= EGS =

EGS may refer to:

== Education ==
- Enfield Grammar School, an English school
- Ermysted's Grammar School, an English school
- European Graduate School, a Swiss private university

== Science ==
- Edinburgh Geological Society
- EGS (program), a Monte Carlo simulation program
- Ehlers–Geren–Sachs theorem
- Enhanced geothermal system
- European Geophysical Society, now part of the European Geosciences Union

== Technology ==
- Emergency gas supply, a backup life support system for underwater diving
- Enhanced Graphics System, on the Amiga computer
- Epic Games Store, a digital video game storefront
- Ergis (company), a Polish chemical company
- Experimental Geodetic Satellite, a Japanese satellite
- Exploration Ground Systems, a NASA program

== Other uses ==
- Ecological goods and services
- Egilsstaðir Airport in Iceland
- Expert Global Solutions, a defunct American debt collection agency
