= Election Support Group =

The Election Support Group (ESG) is an internationally sponsored organization which means to provide analysis and support to the electoral process in Pakistan. The secretariat for the group is the Pakistan branch of the International Foundation for Electoral Systems.

== Activities ==
ESG made 32 major recommendation to the Pakistani Election commission in 2009. These recommendations were issued in January 2009. These recommendations were made by ESG based on the analysis of recommendations provided by 16 international organizations on the reform of the Electoral System of Pakistan.

== Member organizations ==
The following organization sponsor ESG:

- British High Commission in Islamabad
- Embassy of Netherlands in Pakistan
- U.S. Embassy in Islamabad
- Royal Norwegian Embassy in Pakistan
- European Commission
- Department for International Development (U.K.)
- International Foundation for Electoral Systems
- National Democratic Institute
- Free and Fair Election Network
- The Asia Foundation (TAF)
- United Nations Development Programme
- USAID
