= Fiat Global Small Engine =

Engine designed and produced by FCA, Global Small Engine (GSE), codenamed FireFly

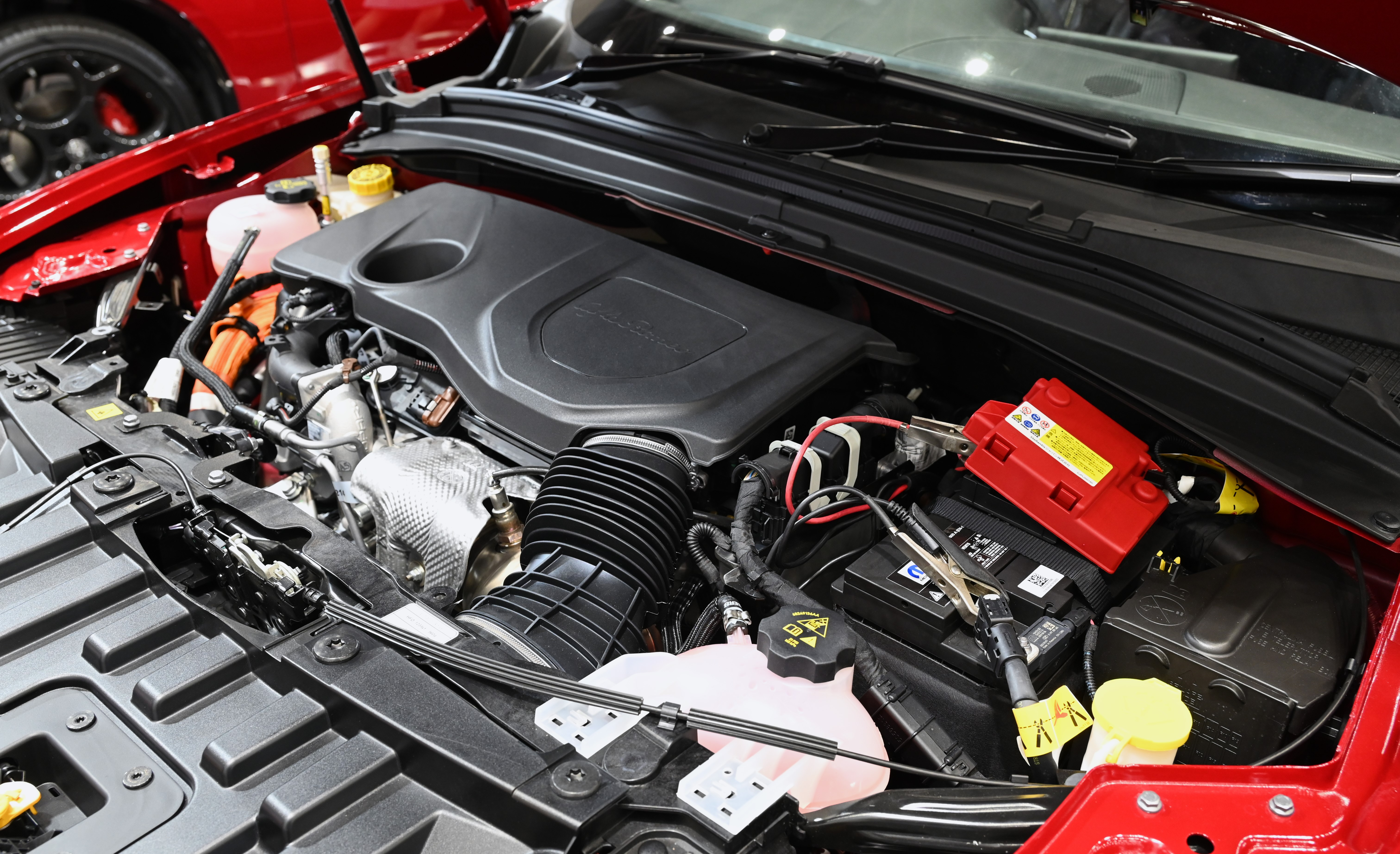
- FireFly T4 engine in an Alfa Romeo Tonale Plug-in Hybrid

Overview
- Manufacturer: Stellantis
- Also called: GSE; FireFly
- Production: 2016–present

Layout
- Configuration: Inline-3 and Inline-4
- Displacement: 1.0 L; 61.0 cu in (999 cc); 1.3 L; 81.3 cu in (1,332 cc); 1.5 L; 89.6 cu in (1,469 cc); (Miller cycle)
- Cylinder bore: 70 mm (2.76 in); 71.2 mm (2.80 in)
- Piston stroke: 86.5 mm (3.41 in); 92.2 mm (3.63 in)
- Valvetrain: 2 for SOHC or 4 valves x cyl. for DOHC with VVT MultiAir III

Combustion
- Turbocharger: Some versions
- Fuel system: Indirect injection; Direct injection
- Fuel type: Gasoline, flex-fuel, ethanol
- Cooling system: Water-cooled

Output
- Power output: 72–180 PS (53–132 kW; 71–178 hp)
- Torque output: 102–285 N⋅m (75–210 lb⋅ft)

Emissions
- Emissions target standard: MHEV / PHEV (Some versions)

Chronology
- Predecessor: FIRE, SGE (TwinAir)

The FCA Global Small Engine (or GSE, marketed as FireFly) is a family of engines produced by Fiat Chrysler Automobiles (FCA) starting in 2016, and subsequently produced by Stellantis, gradually replacing the FIRE (including MultiAir versions) and SGE (TwinAir) units.

It is a modular design (thus inline-3 and inline-4 guises share the same unitary displacement and components such as pistons and connecting rods, so are able to be produced on the same production line), with aluminum cylinder heads and blocks and 77.0 mm cylinder bore spacing for all types.

It was introduced in 2016 in simple naturally aspirated, 2-valve per cylinder with VVT, indirect injected, flex-fuel 1.0 inline-3 and 1.3 inline-4 versions for the South American market under the hood of the 2017 Brazilian Fiat Uno.

Next, it was introduced in 2018 to European and North American markets, in turbocharged, 4-valve per cylinder, direct-injected and MultiAir III versions, under the hood of the 2019 Jeep Renegade and Fiat 500X facelifts.

In 2020, it was introduced to European and North American markets, in MHEV, 4-valve per cylinder and direct-injected versions, under the hood of the 2020 Fiat 500, Fiat Panda (319) and Lancia Ypsilon (846).

== Applications ==
=== South America ===
Engine code	Number of cylinders, valves	Displacement Bore x stroke	Years	Usage	Peak power (ethanol)	Peak torque (ethanol)
N3	Inline-3, 6 valves	1.0 L; 61.0 cu in (999 cc); 70 mm × 86.5 mm (2.76 in × 3.41 in)	2016–present	Fiat Mobi, Fiat Uno, Fiat Argo, Peugeot 208, Citroën C3, Citroën Basalt	72 PS (53 kW; 71 hp) at 6000 rpm 77 PS (57 kW; 76 hp) at 6250 rpm	102 N⋅m (75 lb⋅ft) at 3250 rpm 107 N⋅m (79 lb⋅ft) at 3250 rpm
T200	Inline-3, 12 valves Turbo, Multiair III	1.0 L; 61.0 cu in (999 cc); 70 mm × 86.5 mm (2.76 in × 3.41 in)	2021–present	Fiat Pulse, Fiat Fastback, Fiat Strada, Peugeot 208, Peugeot 2008, Citroën C3 Aircross, Citroën C3 YOU!, Citroën Basalt, Jeep Avenger	130 PS (96 kW; 128 hp) at 5750 rpm (E100) 125 PS (92 kW; 123 hp) at 5750 rpm (gasoline)	200 N⋅m (148 lb⋅ft) at 1750 rpm (E100 or gasoline)
N4	Inline-4, 8 valves	1.3 L; 81.3 cu in (1,332 cc); 70 mm × 86.5 mm (2.76 in × 3.41 in)	2016–present	Fiat Uno, Fiat Argo, Fiat Cronos, Fiat Pulse, Fiat Strada, Fiat Fiorino, Peugeot Partner Rapid, Citroën C3 Aircross, Citroën Basalt	101 PS (74 kW; 100 hp) at 6000 rpm 109 PS (80 kW; 108 hp) at 6250 rpm	134 N⋅m (99 lb⋅ft) at 3500 rpm 139 N⋅m (103 lb⋅ft) at 3500 rpm
T270	Inline-4, 16 valves Turbo, Multiair III	1.3 L; 81.3 cu in (1,332 cc); 70 mm × 86.5 mm (2.76 in × 3.41 in)	2021–present	Jeep Renegade, Jeep Compass, Jeep Commander, Fiat Toro, Abarth Pulse, Fiat Fastback	185 PS (136 kW; 182 hp) at 5750 rpm (E100) 182 PS (134 kW; 180 hp) at 5750 rpm (gasoline)	270 N⋅m (199 lb⋅ft) at 1750 rpm (E100 or gasoline)

=== Europe/North America ===
Engine code	Number of cylinders, valves	Displacement Bore x stroke	Years	Usage	Peak power	Peak torque
N3 BSG	Inline-3, 6 valves, 12V-MHEV, FireFly	1.0 L; 61.0 cu in (999 cc); 70 mm × 86.5 mm (2.76 in × 3.41 in)	2020–present	Fiat 500 (312), Fiat Panda (319), Lancia Ypsilon (846), Fiat 500 Hybrid (332)	70 PS (51 kW; 69 hp) at 6000 rpm	92 N⋅m (68 lb⋅ft) at 3500 rpm
T3	Inline-3, 12 valves Turbo, Multiair III	1.0 L; 61.0 cu in (999 cc); 70 mm × 86.5 mm (2.76 in × 3.41 in)	2018–present	Jeep Renegade FL, Fiat 500X FL, Fiat Tipo	100–120 PS (74–88 kW; 99–118 hp) at 5750 rpm	190 N⋅m (140 lb⋅ft) at 1750 rpm
T4	Inline-4, 16 valves Turbo, Multiair III	1.3 L; 81.3 cu in (1,332 cc); 70 mm × 86.5 mm (2.76 in × 3.41 in)	2018–present	Jeep Renegade FL, Fiat 500X FL, Jeep Compass	150 PS (110 kW; 148 hp) at 5500 rpm 180 PS (132 kW; 178 hp) at 5750 rpm	270 N⋅m (199 lb⋅ft) at 1850 rpm 285 N⋅m (210 lb⋅ft) at 1850 rpm
T4 4xe PHEV	Inline-4, 16 valves Turbo, Multiair III + FCA eMotor	1.3 L; 81.3 cu in (1,332 cc); 70 mm × 86.5 mm (2.76 in × 3.41 in)	2021–present	Jeep Renegade 4xe, Jeep Compass 4xe, Alfa Romeo Tonale	130–180 PS (96–132 kW; 128–178 hp) at 5500 rpm (engine) 60 PS (44 kW; 59 hp) (motor) 190–240 PS (140–177 kW; 187–237 hp) at 5750 rpm (combined)	270 N⋅m (199 lb⋅ft) at 1850 rpm (engine) 250 N⋅m (184 lb⋅ft) (motor) 470 N⋅m (347 lb⋅ft) (combined)
T4 4xe PHEV	Inline-4, 16 valves Turbo, Multiair III + FCA eMotor	1.3 L; 81.3 cu in (1,332 cc); 70 mm × 86.5 mm (2.76 in × 3.41 in)	2022–2026	Alfa Romeo Tonale Plug-in Hybrid, Dodge Hornet	180 PS (132 kW; 178 hp) at 5500 rpm (engine) 123 PS (90 kW; 121 hp) (motor) 279 PS (205 kW; 275 hp) at 5750 rpm (combined)	270 N⋅m (199 lb⋅ft) at 1850 rpm (engine) 250 N⋅m (184 lb⋅ft) (motor) 521 N⋅m (384 lb⋅ft) (combined)
FireFly T4	Inline-4, 16 valves Turbo	1.5 L; 89.6 cu in (1,469 cc); 71.2 mm × 92.2 mm (2.80 in × 3.63 in)	2022–present	Alfa Romeo Tonale Hybrid, Fiat Tipo Hybrid (2022), Fiat 500X Hybrid (2022)	130 PS (96 kW; 128 hp) at 5500 rpm 20 PS (15 kW; 20 hp) (motor)	240 N⋅m (177 lb⋅ft) at 1850 rpm (engine) 55 N⋅m (41 lb⋅ft) (motor)
FireFly T4 VGT	Inline-4, 16 valves VG Turbo	1.5 L; 89.6 cu in (1,469 cc); 71.2 mm × 92.2 mm (2.80 in × 3.63 in)	2022–present	Alfa Romeo Tonale Hybrid VGT	160 PS (118 kW; 158 hp) at 5500 rpm 20 PS (15 kW; 20 hp) (motor)	240 N⋅m (177 lb⋅ft) at 1850 rpm (engine) 55 N⋅m (41 lb⋅ft) (motor)

== See also ==
- MultiAir
- Fully Integrated Robotised Engine FIRE engine
- JTD engine
- List of engines used in Chrysler products
