= GES =

GES or Gęś may refer to:

== People ==
- Grigory Ges (1916–1978), Soviet aviator

== Places ==
- Gęś, Lublin Voivodeship
- Gęś, Pomeranian Voivodeship

== Other uses ==
- General Santos International Airport's IATA code
- Geneva English School
- GES (band), a Swedish supergroup
- Germanium monosulfide (GeS)
- Ghana Education Service, a government agency of the Ministry of Education, Ghana
- Global Economic Symposium, annual conference in Germany
- Good Environmental Status of the EU's Marine Strategy Framework Directive
- Government Economic Service, UK
- Grace Evangelical Society, US
- G♭ (musical note)

== See also ==
- GE (disambiguation)
- Gess (disambiguation)
