= Fiat Fastback (concept car) =

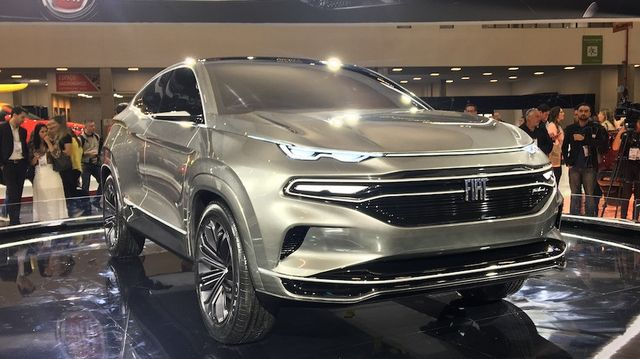

Overview
- Manufacturer: Fiat
- Production: 2018
- Designer: Peter Fassbender at Centro Stile Fiat

Body and chassis
- Class: Concept car
- Body style: 5-door coupe SUV

Dimensions
- Wheelbase: 2,695 mm (106.1 in)
- Length: 4,600 mm (181.1 in)
- Width: 2,045 mm (80.5 in)
- Height: 1,610 mm (63.4 in)

Fiat Fastback is a concept 5-door coupe SUV by Fiat. It was first presented at 2018 São Paulo Motor Show. The production version was released in 2021.

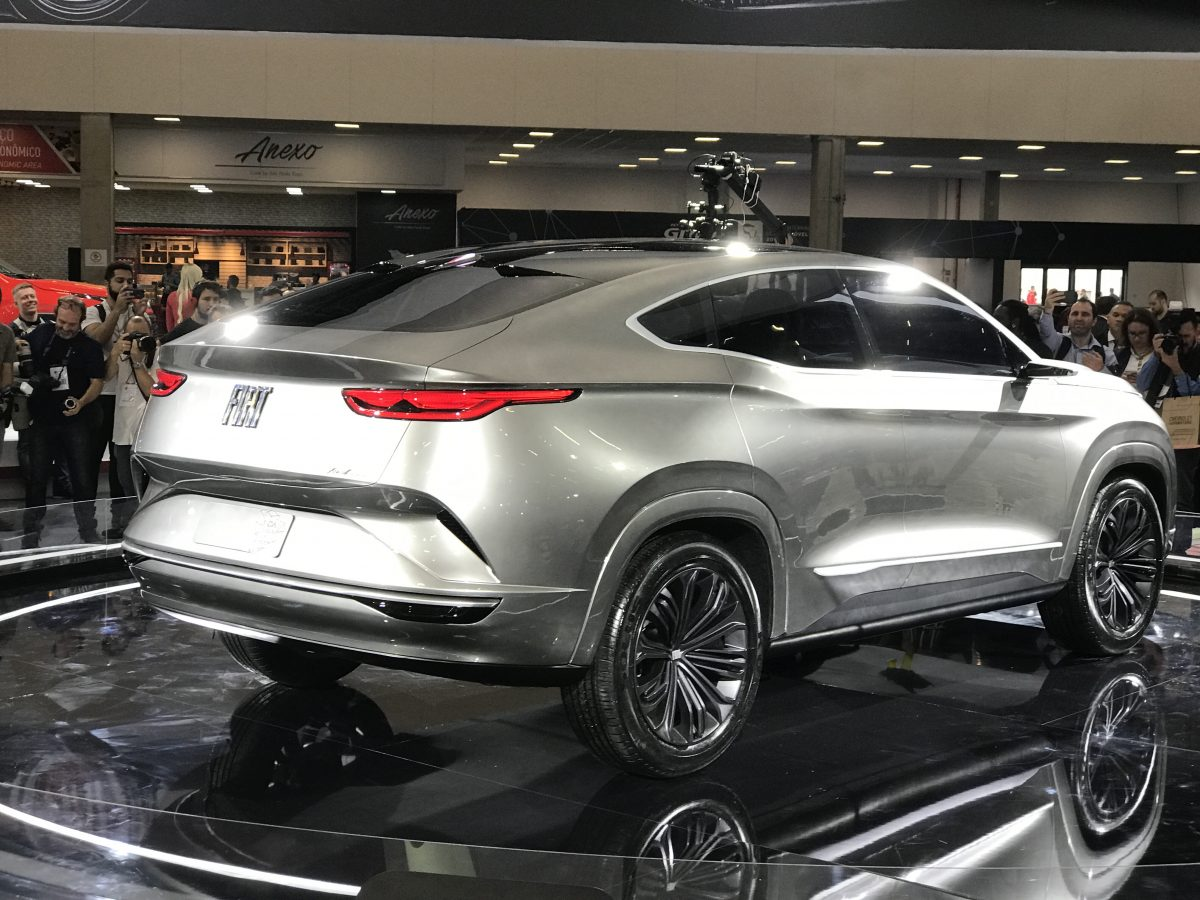
Rear view
