= Fiat Palio =

Supermini car produced by Fiat

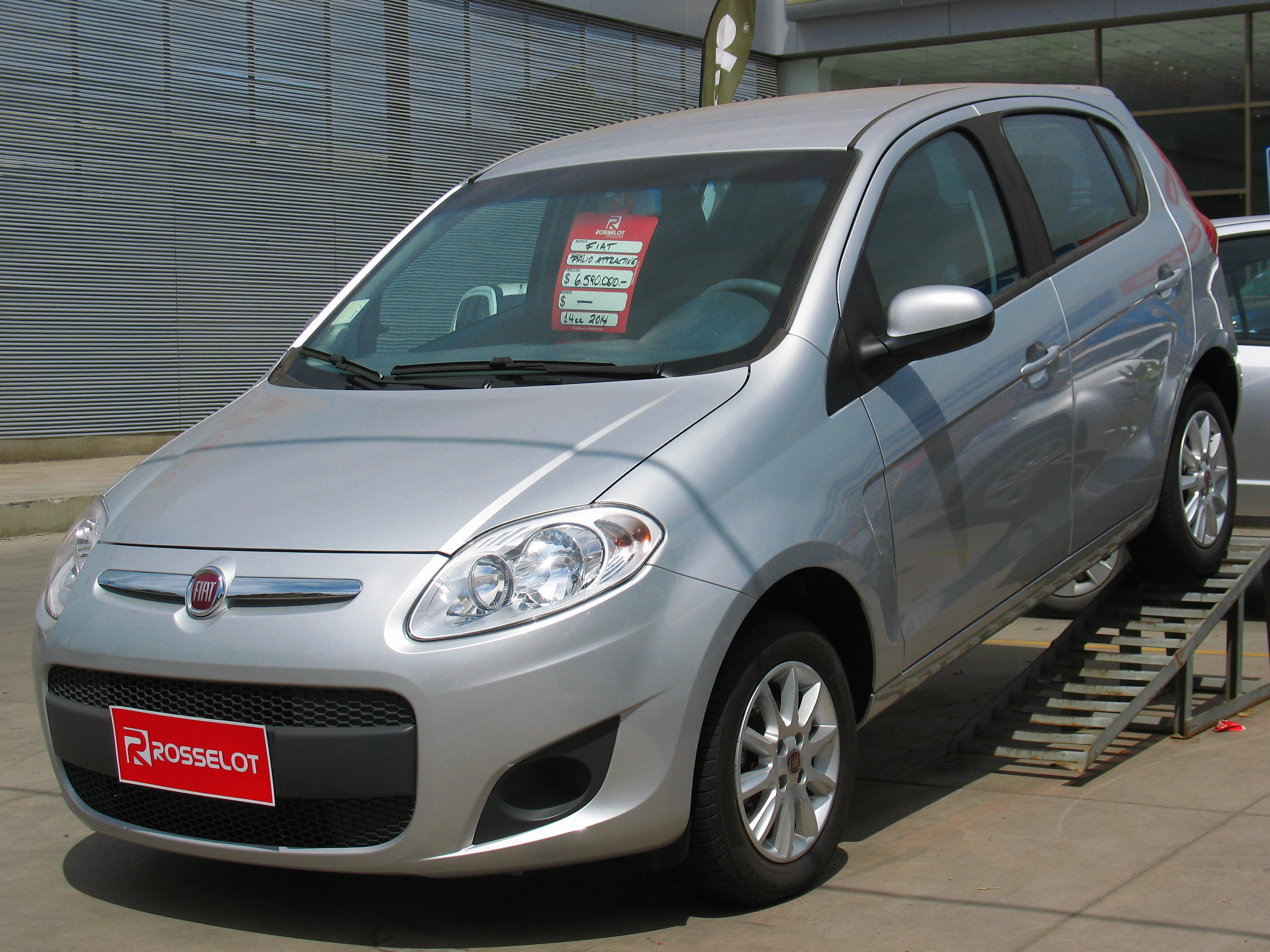

Overview
- Manufacturer: Fiat
- Also called: Fiat Palio Weekend (1997–2014); Fiat Palio Adventure (1999–2014); Nanjing Fiat Palio (China); Zotye Z200 HB (China); Fiat Weekend (2014–2020)
- Production: 1996–2018 (hatchback); 1997–2020 (wagon)

Body and chassis
- Class: Compact car (1996–2016); Subcompact car (2011–2018)
- Body style: 3-door hatchback 5-door hatchback 5-door station wagon
- Layout: Front-engine, front-wheel-drive

Chronology
- Predecessor: Fiat Mille
- Successor: Fiat Argo

The Fiat Palio is a supermini car released by the Italian manufacturer Fiat in April 1996. It was produced until 2018 as hatchback, and 2020 as a wagon.

The Palio is a world car and was developed by Fiat Automóveis with an aim at developing countries. It has been produced in various countries worldwide, and its platform was also used in the Siena sedan, the Palio Weekend station wagon, the Palio Adventure crossover and the Strada light pick-up truck.

== Origins of the Palio badge ==
The Palio badge originated on the European-market Mark II Fiat 127, of 1977, where it was a trim designation rather than an actual model. The 127 Palio featured alloy wheels, a more luxurious interior, and a metallic paint finish as found on the 127 Sport. The Palio designation was also used on other Fiat models throughout the 1980s and 1990s in various markets.

== First generation (178, 1996) ==
First generation (178)
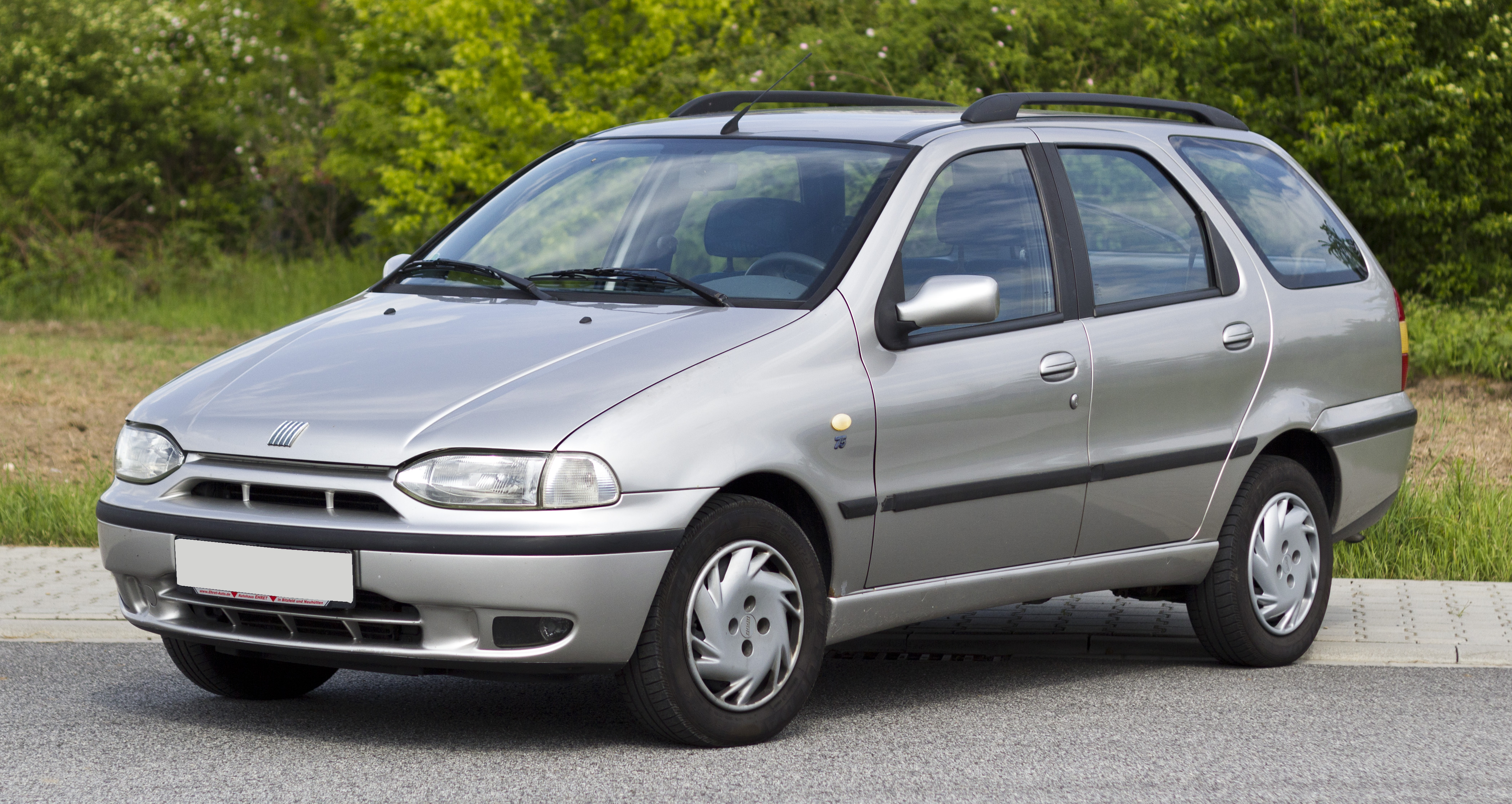
- 1998 Fiat Palio 1.2-L 75 Weekend

Overview
- Production: 1996–2016 (hatchback); 1997–2020 (Weekend)
- Assembly: Brazil: Betim (Fiat Brazil); Argentina: Ferreyra (Fiat Argentina); Turkey: Bursa (Tofaş); Poland: Bielsko-Biała & Tychy (Fiat Auto Poland); China: Nanjing (Nanjing Fiat); India: Ranjangaon, Pune (Fiat India); Morocco: Casablanca (Somaca); South Africa: Rosslyn (Nissan South Africa); Venezuela: La Victoria, Aragua; Russia: Naberezhnye Chelny (Fiat-Sollers)
- Designer: Justyn Norek at I.DE.A Institute (1996); Giorgetto Giugiaro at Italdesign (2001, 2004); Centre Stile Fiat Brazil (2007)

Body and chassis
- Class: Compact car
- Body style: 3-door hatchback 5-door hatchback 5-door station wagon
- Related: Fiat Siena; Fiat Strada; Fiat Punto (176); Fiat Albea; Fiat Perla

Powertrain
- Engine: gasoline: 1.0 L Fire I4; 1.0 L Fiasa I4; 1.1 L Fire I4; 1.2 L Fire I4; 1.3 L Fiasa I4; 1.4 L Sevel I4; 1.4 L Fire I4; 1.5 L Fiasa I4; 1.6 L E.torQ I4; 1.8 L X18XE I4; 1.8 L E.torQ I4; diesel: 1.3 L Multijet I4; 1.7 L turbo I4; 1.9 L I4; 1.9 L JTD I4

Dimensions
- Wheelbase: 2,360 mm (92.9 in) (1996–01); 2,420 mm (95.3 in) (Weekend); 2,360 mm (92.9 in) (2001–04); 2,423 mm (95.4 in) (Weekend); 2,370 mm (93.3 in) (2004–07); 2,440 mm (96.1 in) (Weekend); 2,373 mm (93.4 in) (2007–11); 2,437 mm (95.9 in) (Weekend)
- Length: 3,735 mm (147.0 in) (1996–01); 4,130 mm (162.6 in) (Weekend); 3,740 mm (147.2 in) (2001–04); 4,120 mm (162.2 in) (Weekend); 3,830 mm (150.8 in) (2004–07); 4,210 mm (165.7 in) (Weekend); 3,847 mm (151.5 in) (2007–11); 4,237 mm (166.8 in) (Weekend)
- Width: 1,614 mm (63.5 in) (1996–01); 1,626 mm (64.0 in) (Weekend); 1,614 mm (63.5 in) (2001–04); 1,627 mm (64.1 in) (Weekend); 1,630 mm (64.2 in) (2004–07); 1,630 mm (64.2 in) (Weekend); 1,640 mm (64.6 in) (2007–11); 1,639 mm (64.5 in) (Weekend)
- Height: 1,445 mm (56.9 in) (1996–01); 1,510 mm (59.4 in) (Weekend); 1,445 mm (56.9 in) (2001–04); 1,480 mm (58.3 in) (Weekend); 1,430 mm (56.3 in) (2004–07); 1,520 mm (59.8 in) (Weekend); 1,435 mm (56.5 in) (2007–11); 1,515 mm (59.6 in) (Weekend)

Chronology
- Successor: Fiat Punto (for hatch, Europe); Fiat Palio II (for hatch, Brazil); Fiat Idea (for Palio Weekend, Europe); Fiat Mobi (for Palio Fire); Fiat Pulse (for Weekend, South America)

=== 1996–2002 ===
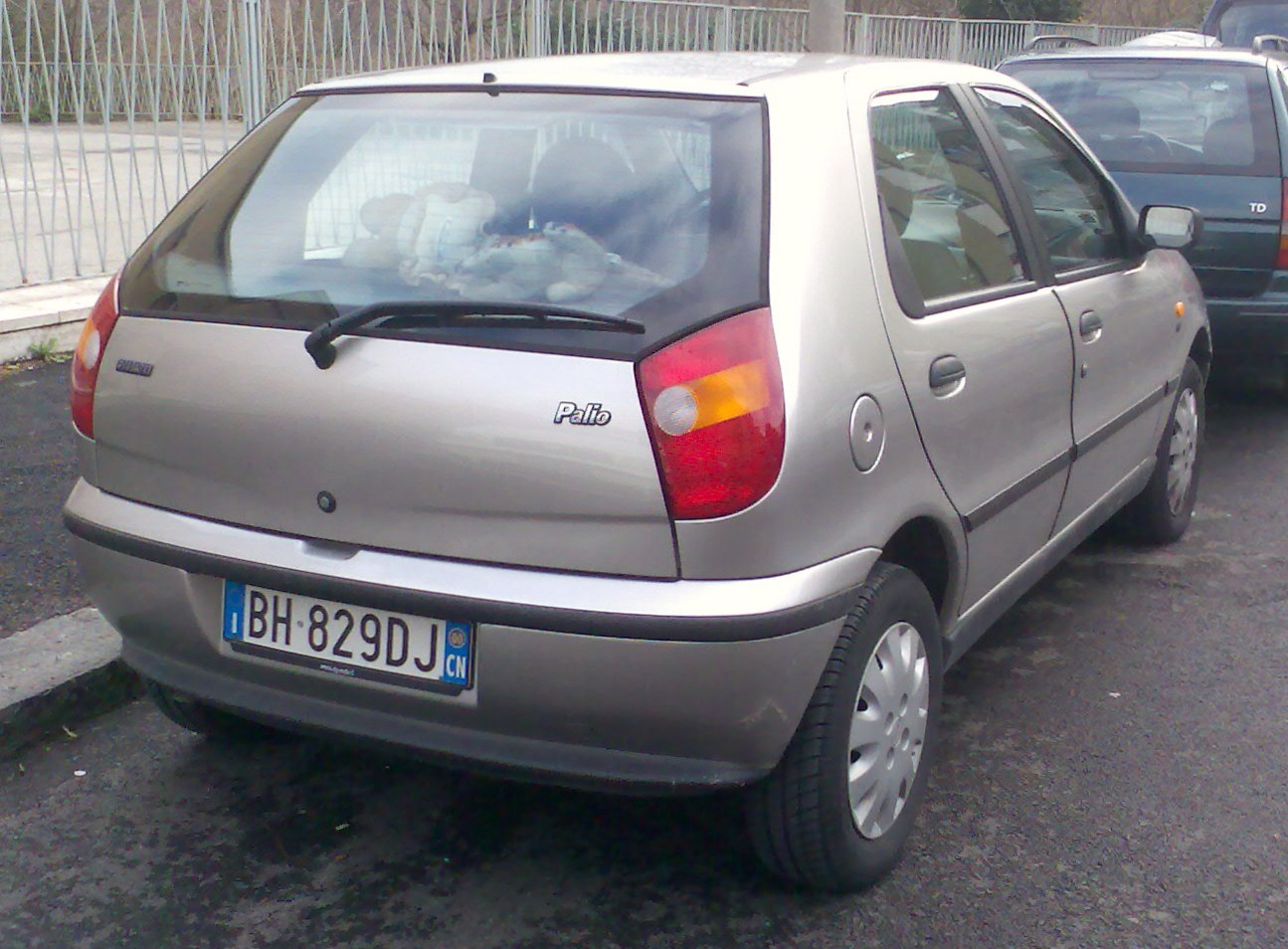
Fiat Palio (Italy)

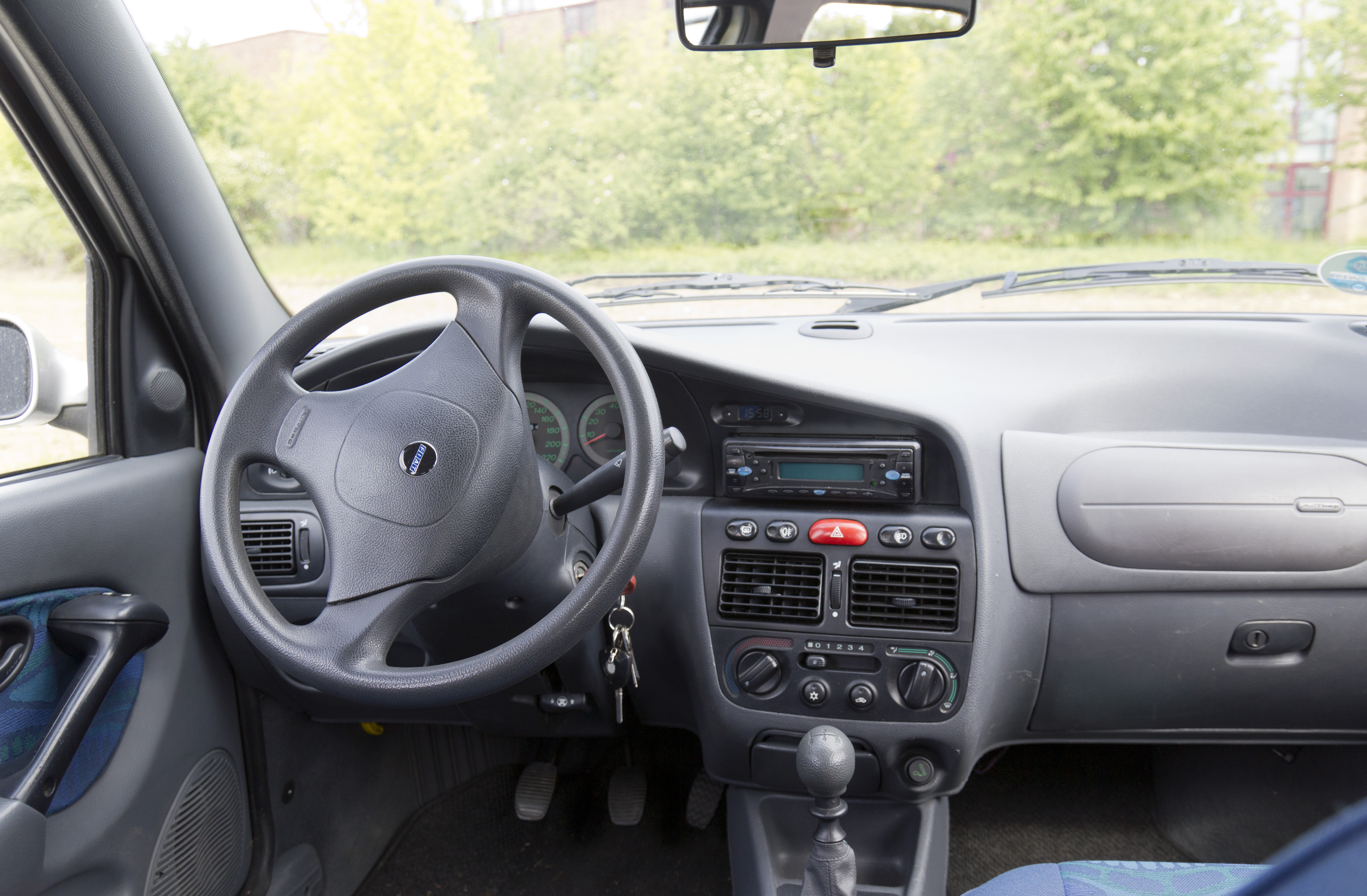
Interior (pre-facelift)

Launched in 1996 in Brazil, as part of Fiat's "Project 178", the Palio was Fiat's first attempt to build a world car, the same basic design produced in numerous nations around the globe. Four principal models were produced: hatchback, sedan, pickup, and station wagon, with different versions built for different markets. The powerplants, both diesel and petrol, also varied from region to region depending on local production capability, legislation, and market requirements.

The basic chassis was a development of the European Fiat Uno but little remained unchanged. The entire structure was significantly stronger to be suitable on the rougher roads found in some of the markets for which it was intended. The suspension layout, as on the Uno, consisted of MacPherson struts at the front and a torsion beam at the rear, even though the Weekend (station wagon) version had the fully independent trailing arms rear end from the Fiat Punto instead. The body was a completely new design by the I.DE.A Institute of Turin, which also designed the new interior. Some engines were also coming from other Fiat models, such as the Punto and the Bravo.

Production began in 1996 in Brazil and was followed later that year by a plant in Argentina. In 1997, production started in Venezuela, Poland for the European market, and Morocco (at the Somaca plant) whilst Turkey started building the same car in 1998. In India, assembly was at Pune in the new Fiat-Tata Motors factory and in South Africa by Nissan together the pickup version called Fiat Strada. Production in India and South Africa began in 1999, in Egypt in 2001, and in China in 2002. The Palio Weekend station wagon was launched in 1996 in Brazil and later in Europe. The station wagon is the version most commonly sold in Europe.

=== 2000–2006 ===
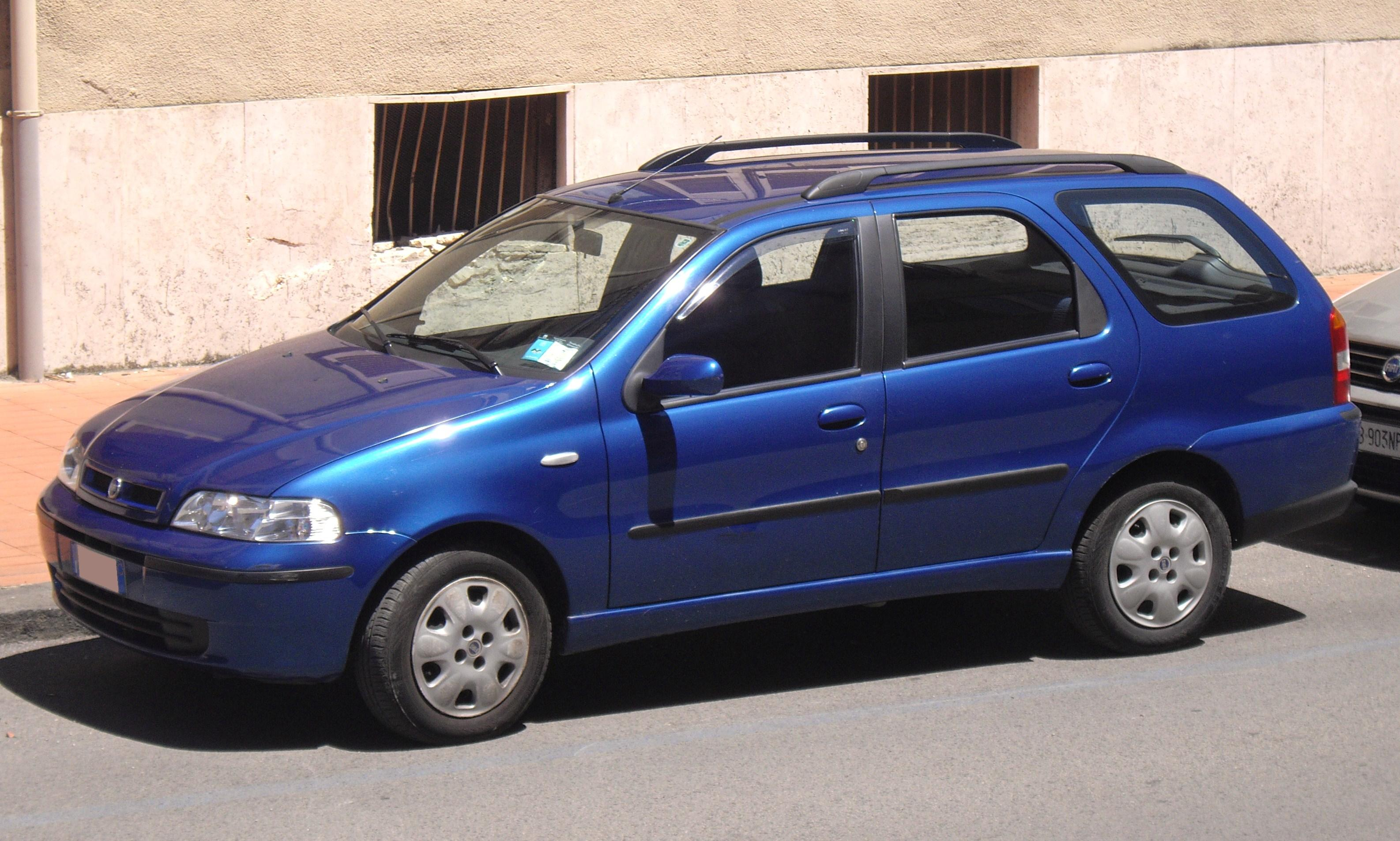
2001 Fiat Palio Weekend (Europe)

In 2000, the model had its first facelift. The facelift was designed by the Italian automobile designer Giorgetto Giugiaro. This facelift included new front and rear fasciae and a brand new interior. Also, new engines came for the Palio: the Fire 16-valve 1.0-L and 1.2-L and the Sporting, a 1.6-L 16-valve engine with 120 hp made in Turkey. The 2001 Palio was the first Fiat to be made in China, by Nanjing Automobile. In some markets, this generation included a Speedgear CVT option. The Palio 2000 facelift is the ultimate version sold in Italy. In 2001, Fiat introduced for the South American market the crossover version, called Palio Adventure and based on the Palio Weekend. In Europe, the Palio Weekend was succeeded in 2003 by the Fiat Idea MPV.

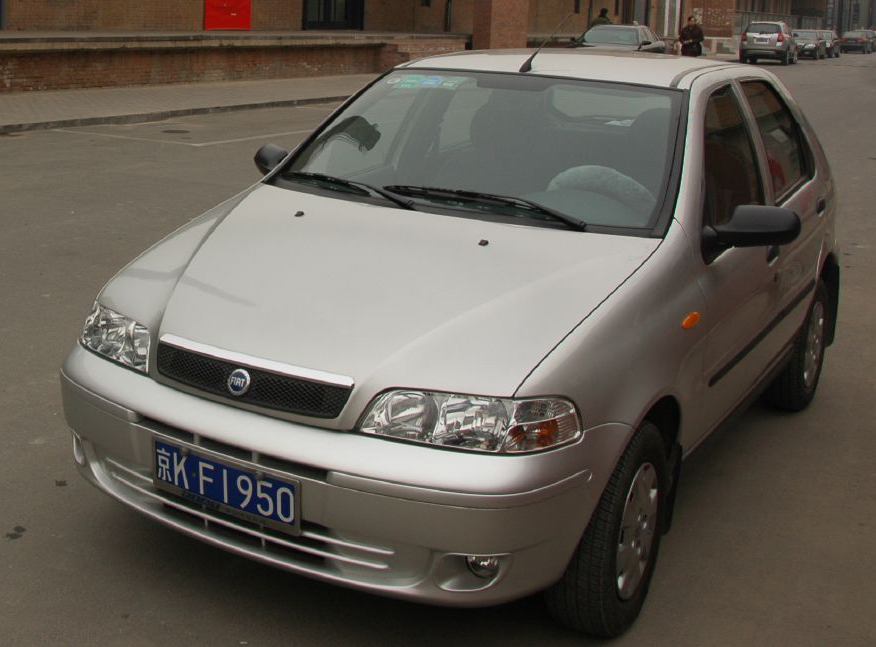
Nanjing Fiat Palio (China)

==== Nanjing Fiat Palio ====
In November 2001, the Chinese Fiat Palio debuted, with either the 60 PS (44 kW) 1.2-L or the 85 PS (63 kW) 1.5-L. The Siena sedan was added in November 2002, followed by the Palio Weekend in June 2003. The Palio Weekend were not available with the smaller engine. A 1.6-L 72 kW weekend was planned but never been sold.

==== Safety rating ====
A Fiat Albea, the sedan version of the Palio, was tested in Russia according to the Euro NCAP latest standard (offset frontal crash at 64 km/h). The Albea scored 8,5 points in the frontal test, equivalent to three stars. The tested vehicle was equipped with standard driver airbag and regular seatbelts.

The Fiat Perla, the Chinese version of the Albea, was tested in China by China-NCAP in three different tests: 100% front crash test with a wall (similar to the U.S. National Highway Traffic Safety Administration test), a 40% offset test (similar to Euro NCAP), and a side crash test. The Perla scored 8.06 points in the 100% frontal crash test, equivalent to three stars; 12.02 pts in the 40% offset crash test, equivalent to four stars, and 10,96 pts in the side crash test, equivalent to three stars; with an average result of 31 points and three stars. The tested vehicle was equipped with standard driver and passenger airbags and regular seatbelts.

=== 2004–2016 ===
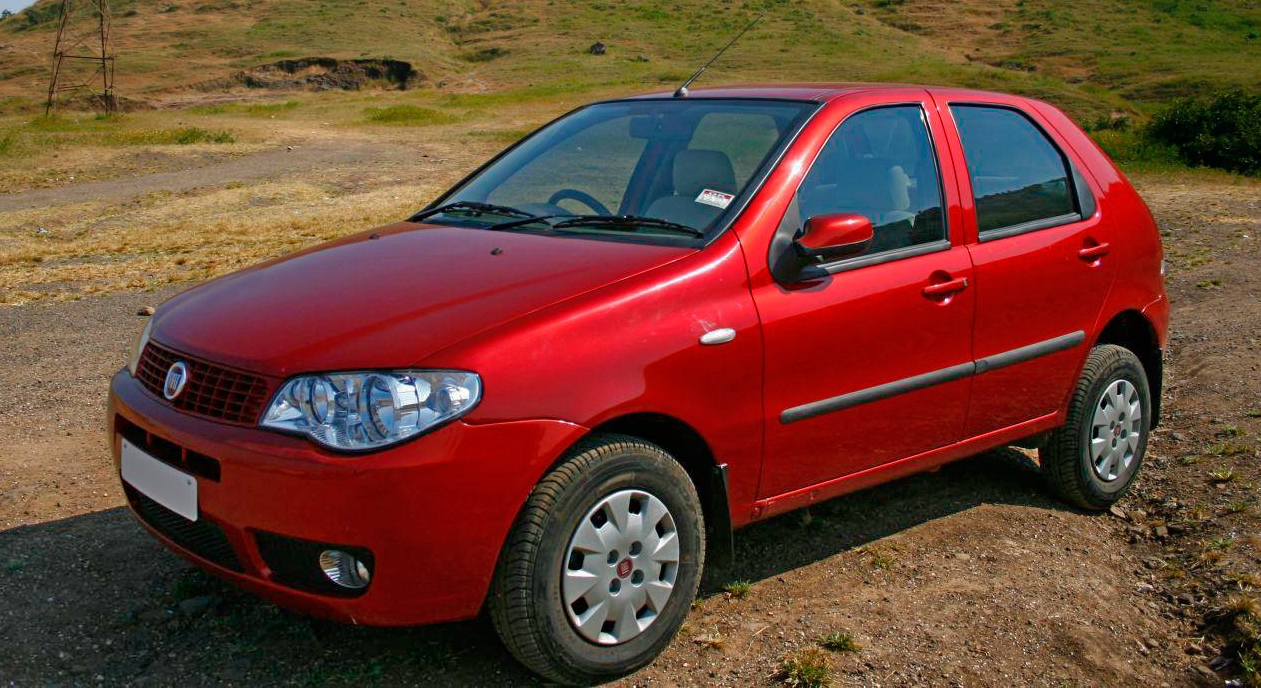
2004 Fiat Palio (India)

The second revision was released in 2004, designed again by Giorgetto Giugiaro. It is basically a facelift from the previous models. The 2004 Palio was the first Brazilian model in the B-segment available with four airbags (two front airbags and two side airbags), parking assistance, and light and rain sensor. In Europe, the new model featured a redesigned front fascia and interior with rear fascia similar to Palio 2001 version. For the Brazilian market, there was also a sport version called the Palio 1.8R. This was equipped with a new version of the General Motors, 1.8-litre X18XE engine rated at 115 hp (ethanol) and 112 hp (gasoline), lowered suspension, new 14-inch alloy wheels, new seats, and other sporting features. The third generation of the Palio had huge sales numbers, even getting higher sales in some months than the VW Gol, the best-selling car in Brazil for over 24 years. It was sold as the Palio Fire Economy as a cheaper alternative to its posterior facelift, with alterations derived from the Uno Mille Fire Economy model. The top model is Weekend Adventure version; it is equipped with a 1.8-L Powertrain Flex fuel engine with 112 hp (petrol/gasoline) and 114 hp (ethanol) at 5500 rpm, all-terrain Pirelli Citynet tires, and a higher/reinforced suspension kit but still with 4x2 drive.

Fiat India manufactured the 2004 Palio, with 2001-version interiors, at the Ranjangaon plant along with the Grande Punto and Linea. After entering into a partnership with Tata Motors, the Palio was relaunched as the Palio Stile, with the 1.1 Fire, 1.6 Torque, and 1.3 Multijet engines. Sales were low, at hardly 200 units per month.

=== 2007–2011 ===
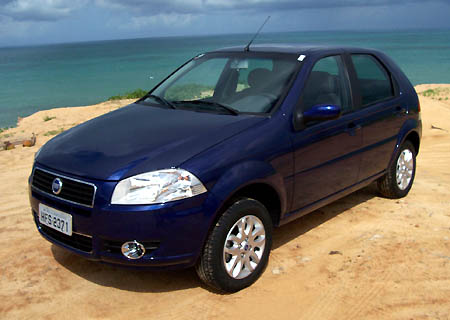
2007 Fiat Palio

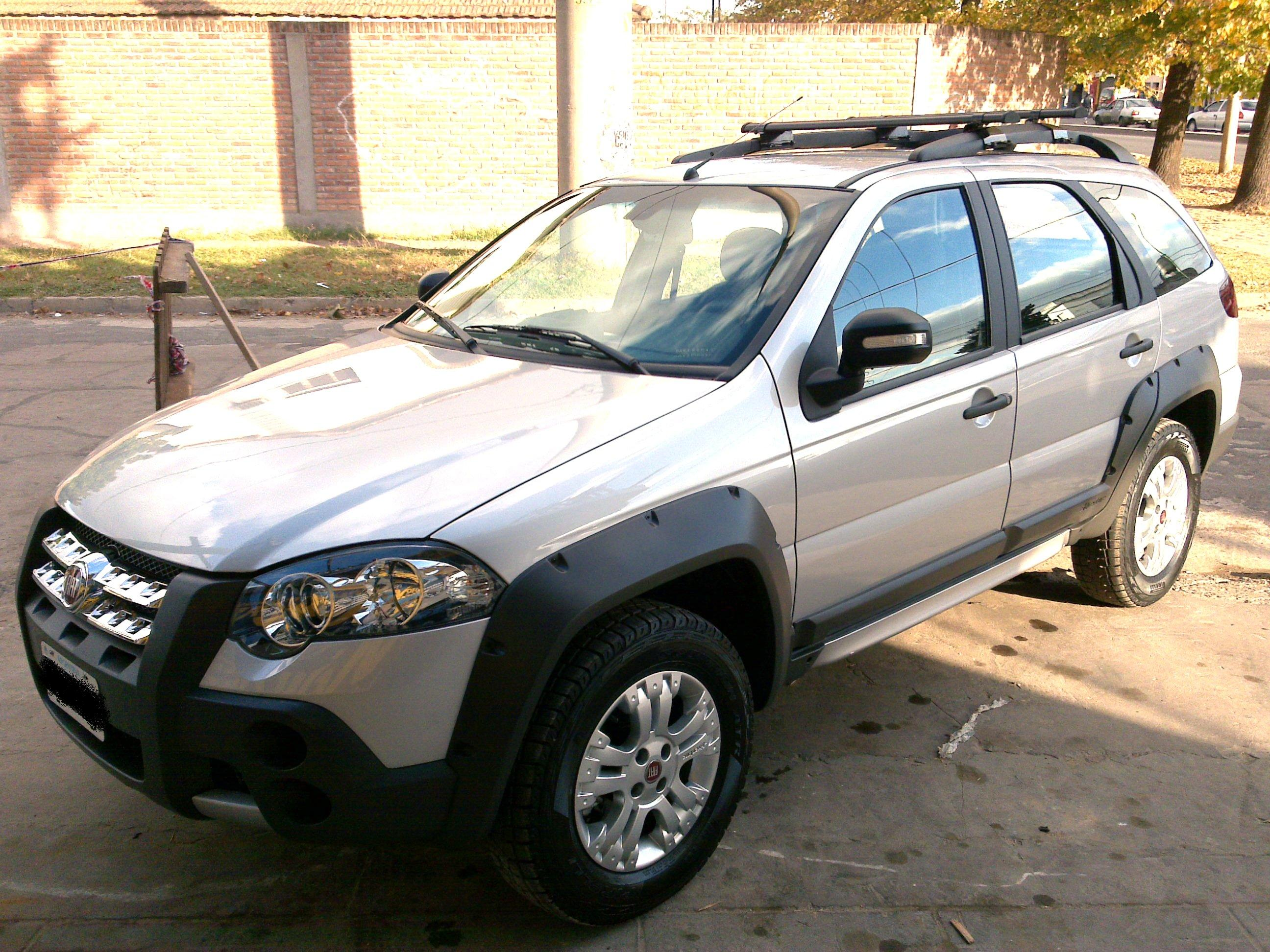
2010 Fiat Palio Adventure

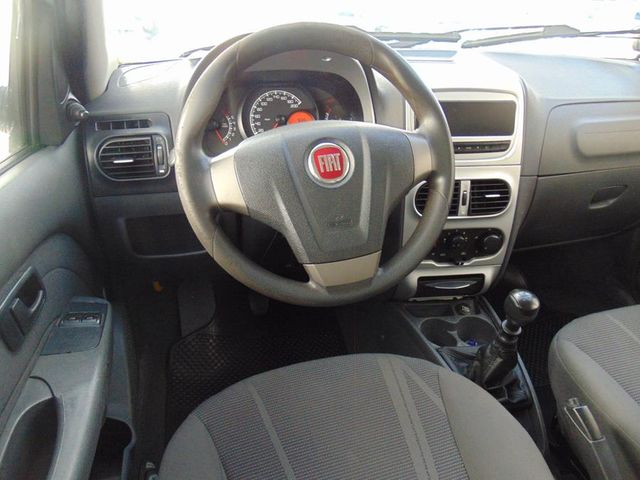
Interior (2007 facelift)

The last Palio facelift was launched in 2007, in Natal, Brazil. The design of the body was inspired by the new version of the Grande Punto, which was launched in Brazil in the first quarter of 2008.

This fourth facelift included a new front, rear, and side designs, but it kept the original chassis from the 1996 model, being marketed as the New Palio. It also has a minor change in the instrument panel with differences between the two variants sold.

The trims for this new Palio are ELX with the 1.0- or the 1.4-L Fire engines, both flex (ethanol and petrol) and the "sporty" version 1.8R with the current revision of the 1.8-L 8-valve engine from GM, also flexible. The new Torque engines were added to the Palio after the launch of the Grande Punto. The Palio Adventure introduced the new limited-slip differential and new suspension for off-road with front-wheel drive.

In 2011, after buying the Brazilian factory and the project of the Tritec engine, Fiat modified it and launched its new line of 4 cylinder engines (E-Torq) in South America, being the 1.6 16V (114 HP) equipping all the family, and the 1.75 (sold as 1.8, 130 HP) equipping the Strada and Palio Weekend.

In 2012 Palio and its LWB-sedan variant, Albea has been discontinued in Tofaş plant.

In 2014 the station-wagon variant has been renamed as Fiat Weekend, dropping the Palio name.

== Second generation (326; 2011) ==
Second generation (326)
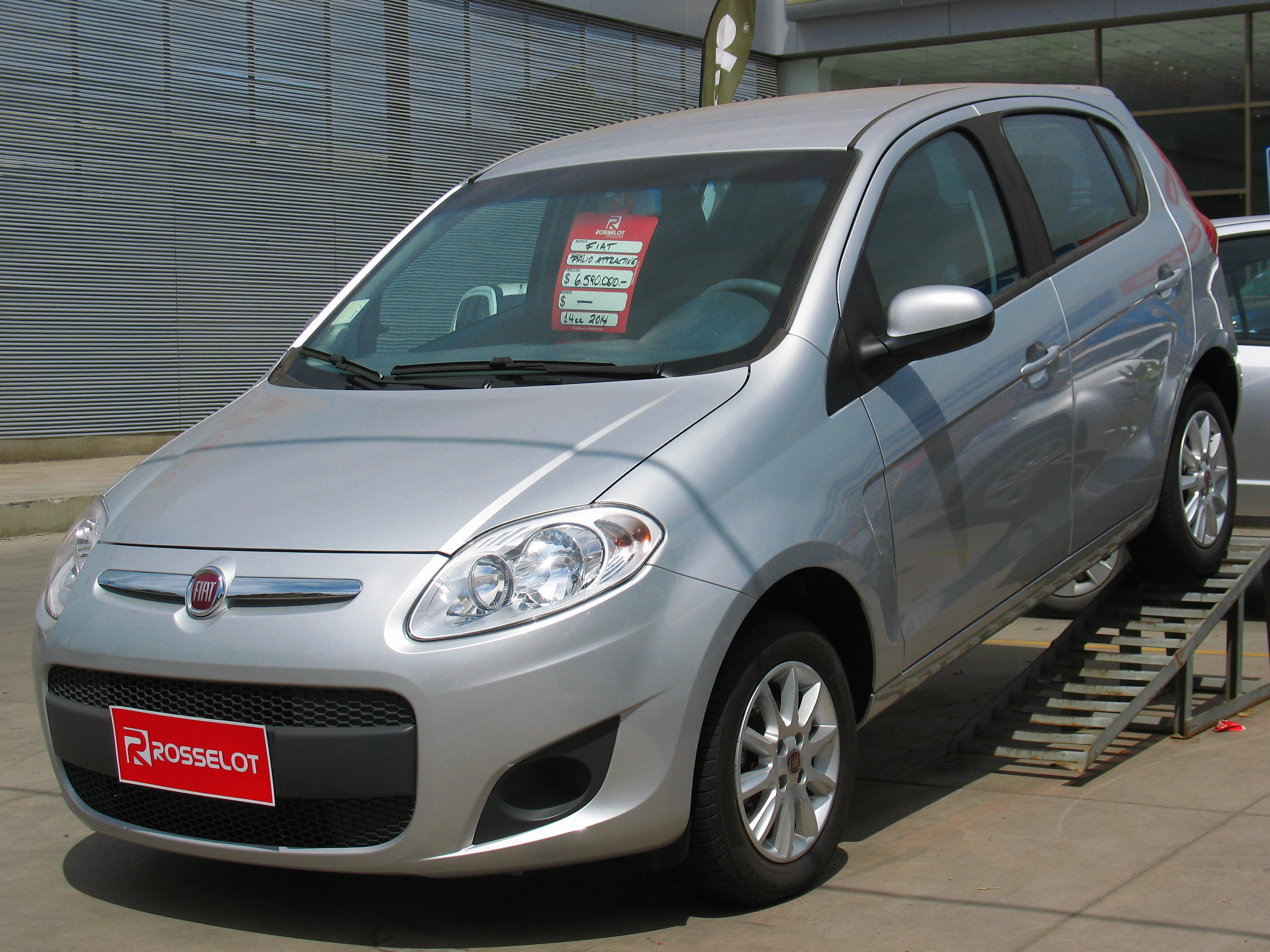

Overview
- Model code: 326
- Production: 2011–2018
- Assembly: Brazil: Betim (Fiat Brazil); Argentina: Ferreyra (Fiat Argentina)
- Designer: Roberto Giolito

Body and chassis
- Class: Subcompact car
- Body style: 5-door hatchback
- Platform: FCA Economy
- Related: Fiat Uno (327); Fiat Grand Siena

Powertrain
- Engine: 1.0 L FIRE Evo I4 flex fuel 1.4 L FIRE Evo I4 flex fuel 1.6 L E.torQ I4 flex fuel
- Transmission: 5-speed manual 5-speed Dualogic automated manual

Dimensions
- Wheelbase: 2,420 mm (95.3 in)
- Length: 3,875 mm (152.6 in)
- Width: 1,670 mm (65.7 in)
- Height: 1,504 mm (59.2 in) (Attractive); 1,513 mm (59.6 in) (Essence); 1,508 mm (59.4 in) (Sporting)

Chronology
- Successor: Fiat Argo

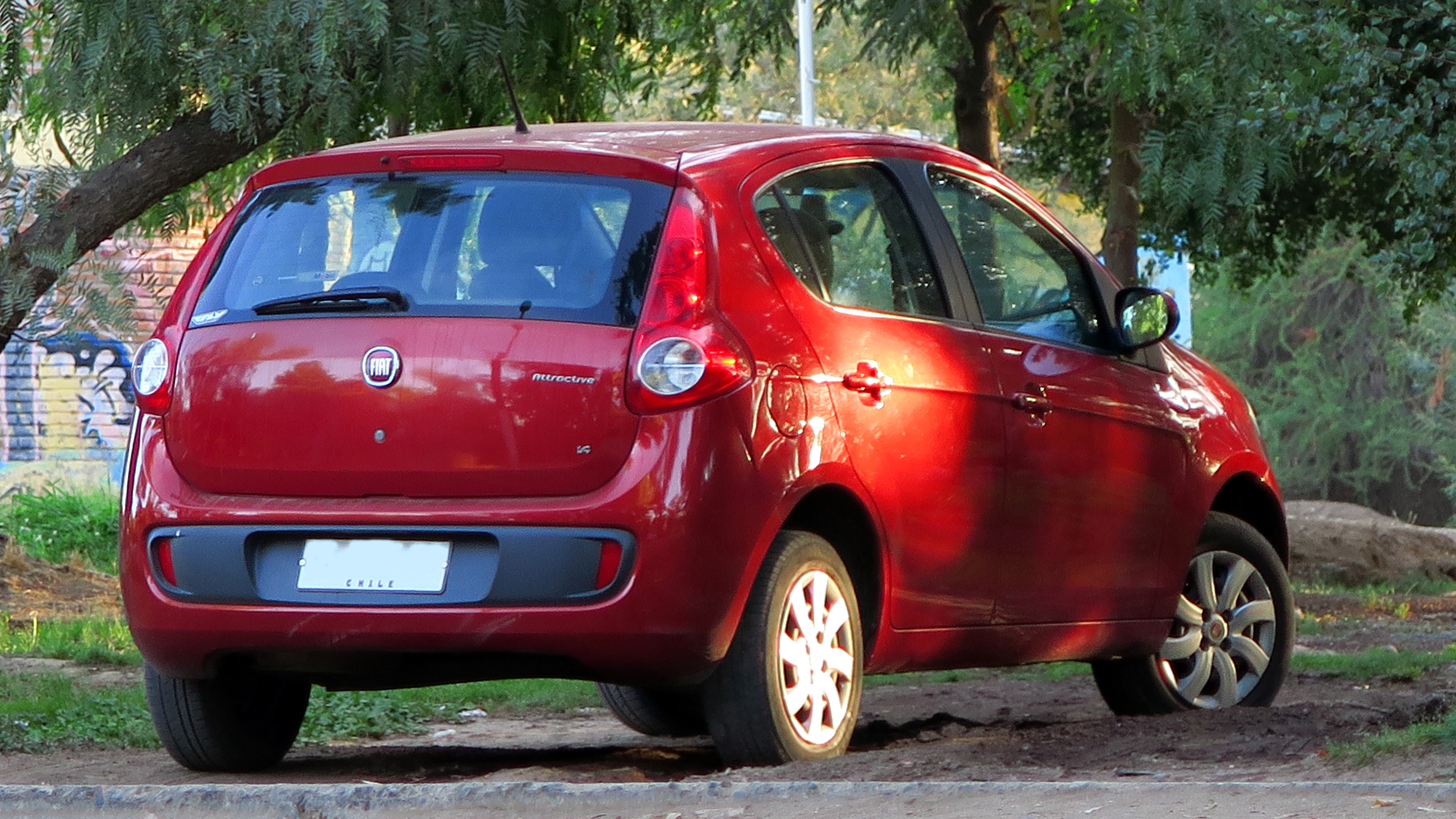
Fiat Palio rear

An all-new generation of Palio was revealed in October 2011, at the annual Fiat dealers' meeting in Mykonos, Greece. The official launch, however, took place on 4 November 2011, in Brazil. It is the first total remodeling since launch in 1996. The project, code named 326, was anticipated by the success of the new Fiat Uno in Brazil. One of the new versions will be the Sporting, a trim level known for the sporty versions of the Siena, Uno, Idea, Bravo, and Strada. In late 2017, the Fiat Palio assembly line stopped in Argentina, due to Fiat's plans to start assembling the new Fiat Cronos, the saloon version of Fiat Argo, as well as a basic version of Argo without the Chrysler UConnect multimedia system, making the Palio officially discontinued worldwide after 21 years.

== Electric version ==
In 2007, Fiat joined Brazilian utility companies Cemig and Itaipu to develop new electric vehicles for Brazil. The Palio electric conversions were manufactured in small numbers with only limited production, with an initial batch of converted Fiat Palio cars scheduled to start testing in late 2007. After three years in development, the Palio Weekend entered production at Fiat's Foz do Iguazu factory in Brazil.

== Motorsport ==
Several competition and homologated versions of the Palio have been produced, such as the A6 class rally car, multiple Brazilian and South American champion of the A6 class with Brazilian Luis Tedesco as the driver, and the Turkish Fiat-Abarth Motorsport Turkey Rally Team-created Palio Super 1600 rally car, with a 215-hp 1.6-L 16-valve engine and a six-speed sequential transmission. Turkey also boasts an N2 Palio. Furthermore with this Palio Super 1600 Volkan Işık and the Fiat Abarth Motorsports Türkiye team won both the drivers and manufacturers titles in the 2003 Turkish Rally Championship.

== Safety ==
The first generation design of Fiat Palio, that had very few structural changes from 1997, has been rated as highly unsafe by Latin NCAP 1.0 in its most basic Latin American market configuration with no airbags in 2010, scoring only one star for adult occupants and two stars for children. Its airbag-equipped version scored three stars in 2011, although it is a vast minority in the sales mix. This changed with the Brazilian law requiring dual front airbags from 2014 on.

Latin NCAP 1.0 test results Fiat Palio ELX + 2 Airbags (2010, based on Euro NCAP 1997)
Test	Points	Stars
Adult occupant:	10.65/17.0	3 /5 stars
Child occupant:	21.27/49.00	3 /5 stars

Latin NCAP 1.0 test results Fiat Palio ELX 1.4 - NO Airbags (2010, based on Euro NCAP 1997)
Test	Points	Stars
Adult occupant:	4.89/17.0	1 /5 stars
Child occupant:	22.51/49.00	2 /5 stars

The New Palio in its most basic Latin American market configuration with no airbags and no ABS received 0 stars for adult occupants and 2 stars for toddlers from Latin NCAP 1.0 in 2014.

Latin NCAP 1.5 test results Fiat New Palio - NO Airbags (2014, similar to Euro NCAP 2002)
Test	Points	Stars
Adult occupant:	0/17.0	0 /5 stars
Child occupant:	18.01/49.00	2 /5 stars

The New Palio in its most basic Latin American market configuration with 2 airbags received 3 stars for adult occupants and 2 stars for toddlers from Latin NCAP 1.0 in 2014.

Latin NCAP 1.5 test results Fiat New Palio + 2 Airbags (2014, similar to Euro NCAP 2002)
Test	Points	Stars
Adult occupant:	10.84/17.0	3 /5 stars
Child occupant:	20.37/49.00	2 /5 stars

The updated New Palio in its most basic Latin American market configuration with 2 airbags received 4 stars for adult occupants and 3 stars for toddlers from Latin NCAP 1.0 in 2015.

Latin NCAP 1.5 test results Fiat New Palio + 2 Airbags (from july 2015) (2015, similar to Euro NCAP 2002)
Test	Points	Stars
Adult occupant:	11.34/17.0	4 /5 stars
Child occupant:	25.28/49.00	3 /5 stars

The New Palio in its most basic Latin American market configuration with 2 airbags and no ESC received 1 star for adult occupants and 3 stars for toddlers from Latin NCAP 2.0 in 2016.

Latin NCAP 2.0 test results Fiat New Palio + 2 Airbags (2016, based on Euro NCAP 2008)
Test	Points	Stars
Adult occupant:	18.09/34.0	1 /5 stars
Child occupant:	31.57/49.00	3 /5 stars

== Sales ==
Year	Europe	China	Argentina	Brazil	México as Hatchback	Argentina as Weekend	Brazil as Weekend	México as Adventure
1996				156,930				
1997				290,820			46,953	
1999	52,585							
2000	49,053							
2001	22,466			163,706			37,303	
2002	9,769	13,914		130,814			30,406	
2003	2,293	16,443		119,371			22,322	
2004	12,943	15,575		128,218			23,401	
2005	9,897	22,284		126,457	1,114		26,904	
2006		19,191		162,726	159		22,049	
2007		11,191	13,809	221,750	182	5,830	18,278	
2008			11,916	197,224	648	4,282	30,392	
2009			9,092	203,736	23	5,053	43,249	
2010			6,413	137,519	3		31,743	
2011			15,524	105,794			22,853	
2012			13,851	186,384			18,629	49
2013			22,244	177,014	1,114		15,554	416
2014			26,488	183,741	523		10,850	526
2015			26,757	122,364	603		10,723	702
2016			29,109	63,996	555		7,302	890
2017			27,200	20,138	327		3,497	750
2018				391	9		3,165	888
2019				40			3,191	818
2020				4			187	469
2021				11			10	

== See also ==
- Fiat Siena
- Fiat Strada
