= Fiat Strada =

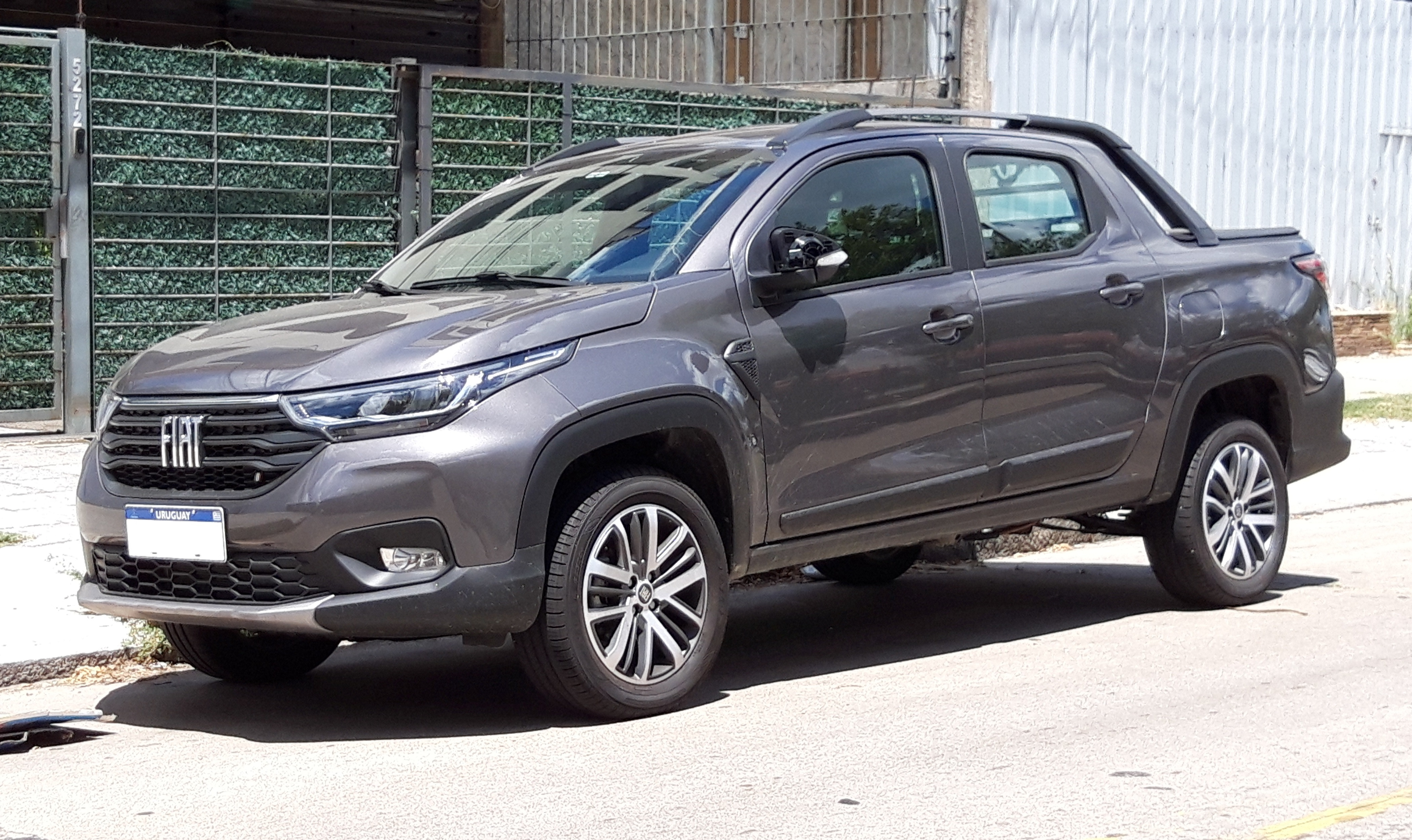

Overview
- Manufacturer: Fiat
- Also called: RAM 700 (Mexico)
- Production: 1998–present

Body and chassis
- Class: Coupé utility
- Body style: 2/3-door pickup truck; 4-door pickup truck
- Layout: Front-engine, front-wheel-drive
- Chassis: Unibody

Chronology
- Predecessor: Fiat Fiorino pickup

The Fiat Strada is a coupé utility produced by the Italian manufacturer Fiat since 1998. It is mainly produced in Brazil and marketed throughout Latin America, whereas the first-generation Strada was also assembled in South Africa and exported to Europe from Brazil.

Based on a unibody chassis with front-wheel drive configuration, the Strada shares its platform with several Fiat subcompact cars such as the Palio, Siena, and Uno. As of 2024, the Strada is the smallest of three Fiat pickup trucks, which include the larger unibody Toro and the body-on-frame Titano.

== First generation (278; 1998) ==
First generation
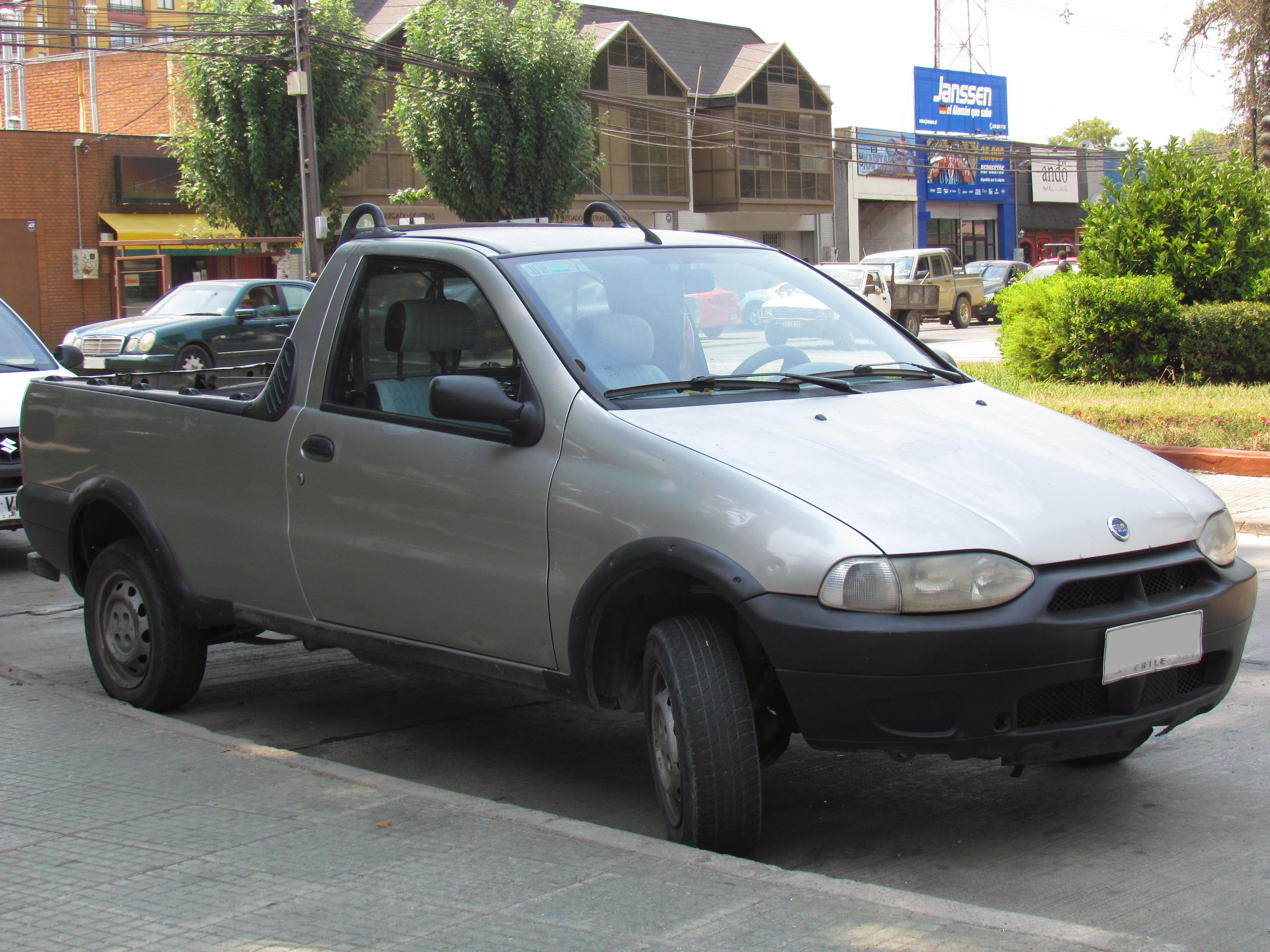

Overview
- Also called: RAM 700 (Mexico, 2015–2021)
- Production: 1998–2021
- Assembly: Brazil: Betim; Turkey: Bursa (Tofaş); South Africa: Rosslyn (Nissan South Africa)
- Designer: Giorgetto Giugiaro

Body and chassis
- Platform: Project 178
- Related: Fiat Palio (first generation); Fiat Siena (first generation); Fiat Albea

Powertrain
- Engine: Petrol: 1.2 L Fiat FIRE I4; 1.3 L FIASA I4; 1.4 L Fiat FIRE I4; 1.4 L Fiat FIRE Evo I4 flex-fuel; 1.5 L FIASA I4 flex-fuel; 1.6 L Torque I4; 1.6 L E.torQ I4 flex-fuel; 1.8 L E.torQ I4 flex-fuel; 1.8 L Ecotec I4 flex-fuel; Diesel: Fiat 1.3 L MultiJet I4; Fiat 1.7 L turbo I4; Fiat 1.9 L JTD I4
- Transmission: 5-speed manual 7-speed CVT

Dimensions
- Wheelbase: 2,718 mm (107.0 in)
- Length: 4,398 mm (173.1 in) (1996–2001); 4,400 mm (173.2 in) (2001–2004); 4,444 mm (175.0 in) (2004–2009); 4,409 mm (173.6 in) (2009–2020)
- Width: 1,665 mm (65.6 in) (1996–2004); 1,664 mm (65.5 in) (2004–2020)
- Height: 1,505 mm (59.3 in) (1996–2004); 1,559 mm (61.4 in) (2004–2009); 1,564 mm (61.6 in) (2009–2020)

Launched in October 1998 in Brazil, the first-generation Fiat Strada is the cargo carrying derivative of the "Project 178". The Fiat Strada was made to replace the Fiat City, a pickup version of the Fiorino, a commercial derivative of the Fiat Uno. The Strada features a maximum loading capacity of 700 kg (1,543 lb) and a cargo space of 1,770 mm (69.7 in) x 1,314 mm (51.7 in).

In Europe, the Fiat Strada was launched in April 1999 with two engine options: the 1.2 Fire petrol with 73 hp (54 kW) and the 1.7 turbodiesel with 70 hp (51 kW).

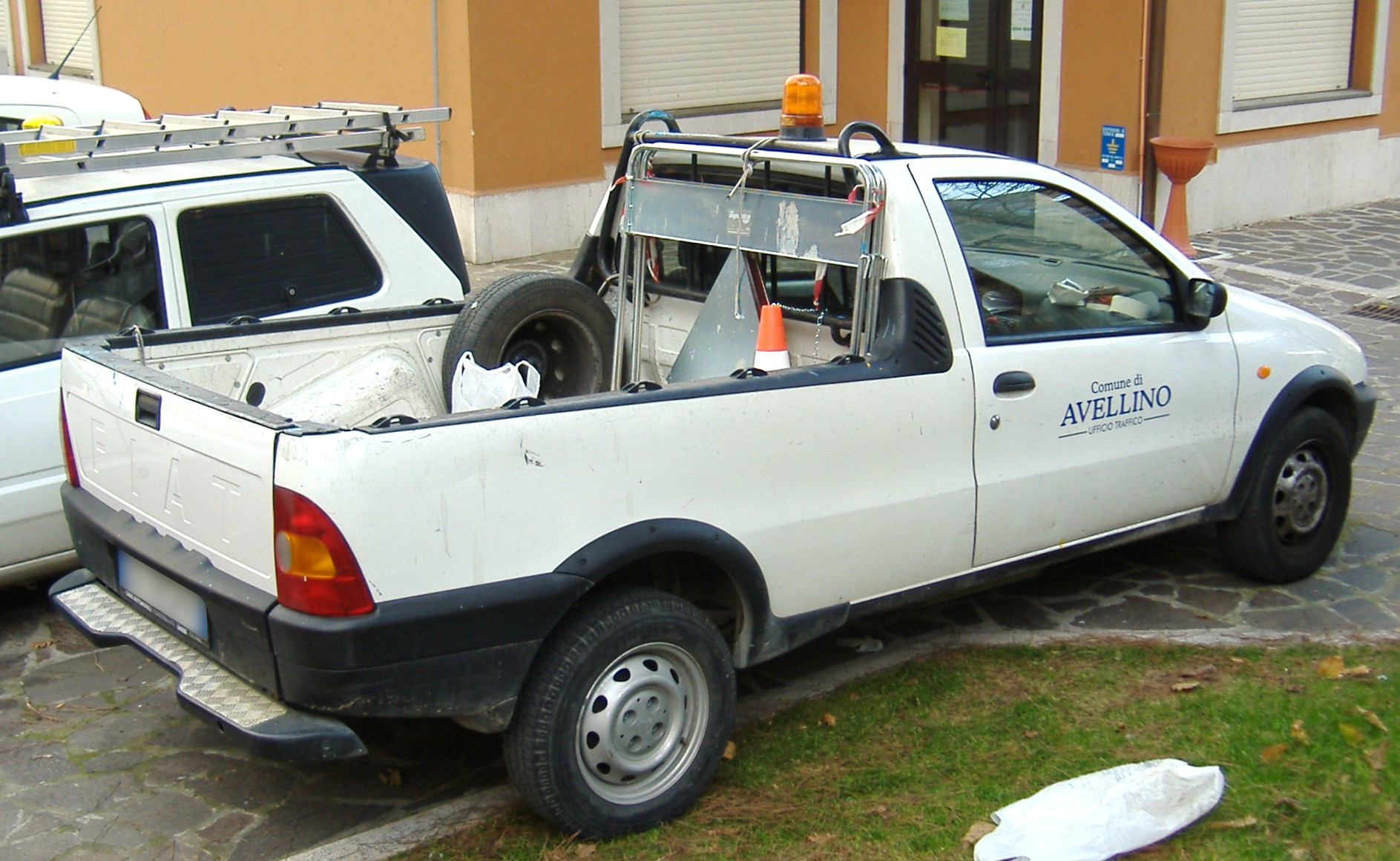
1996-2000 Fiat Strada rear

=== 2001 revision ===
In 2001, the model had its first facelift. The new design was made by the Italian design guru Giorgetto Giugiaro. The facelift included a new front and interior. The Mark II series marked the début of an extended-cab version. In 2002, Fiat do Brasil launched the first version of a Fiat Strada Adventure, with "off-road" looks.

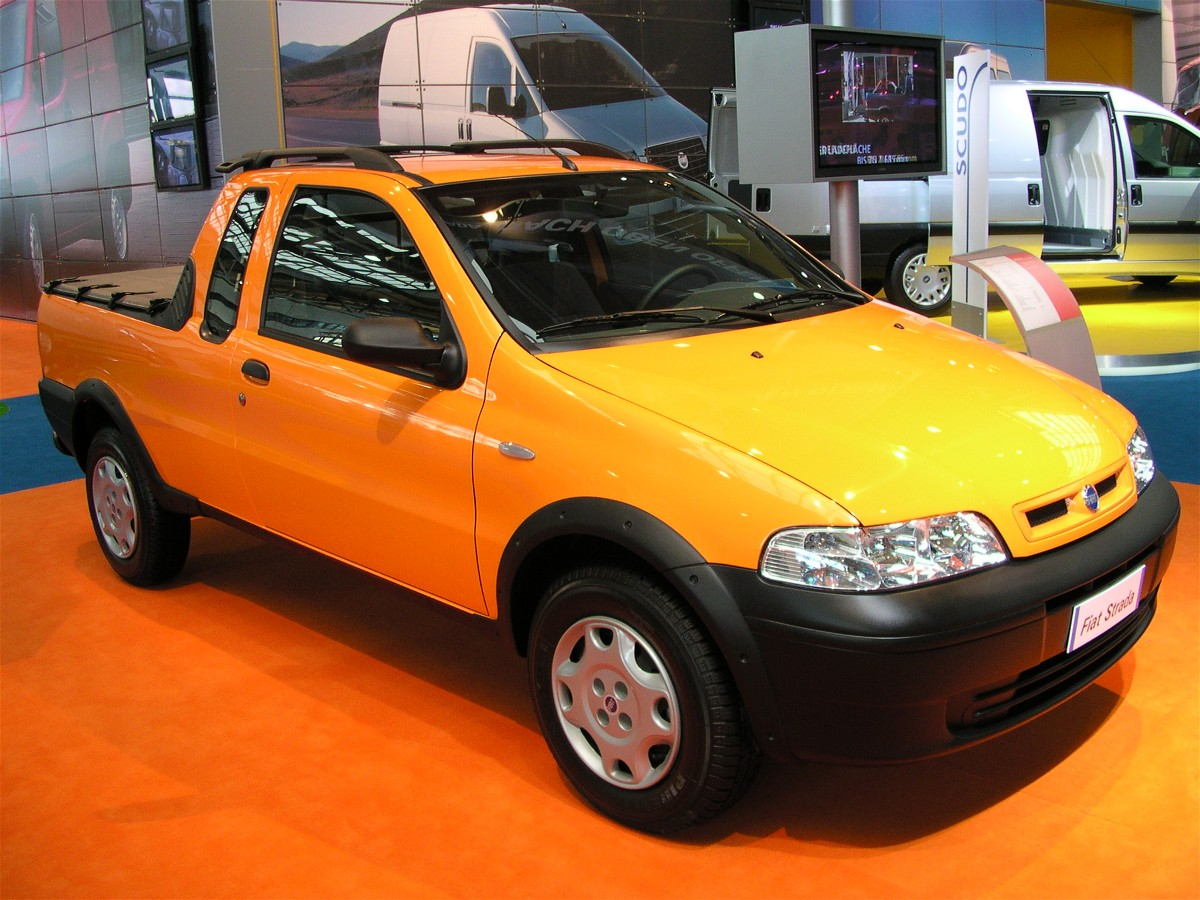
2001 Fiat Strada

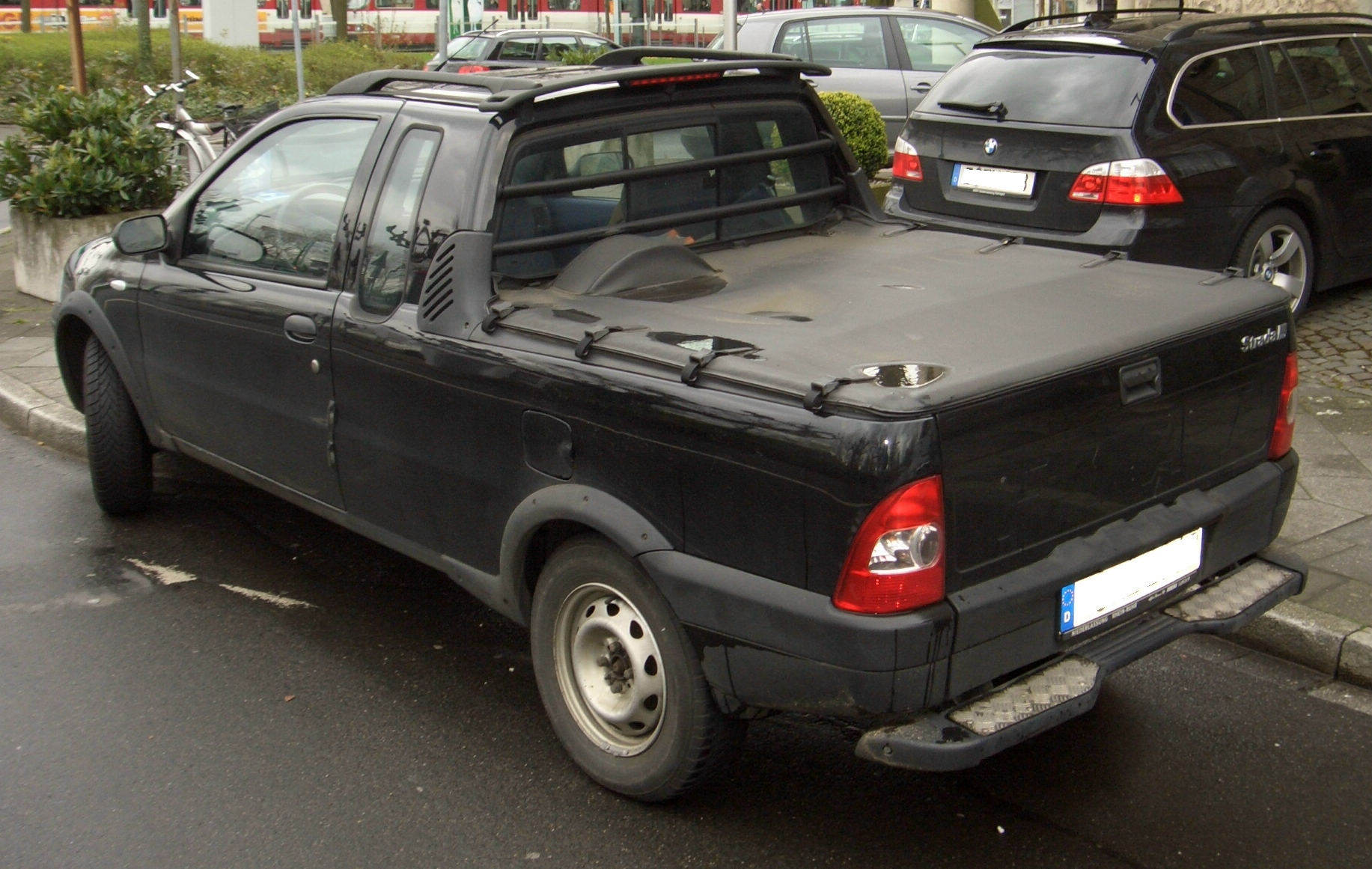
2001 Fiat Strada rear

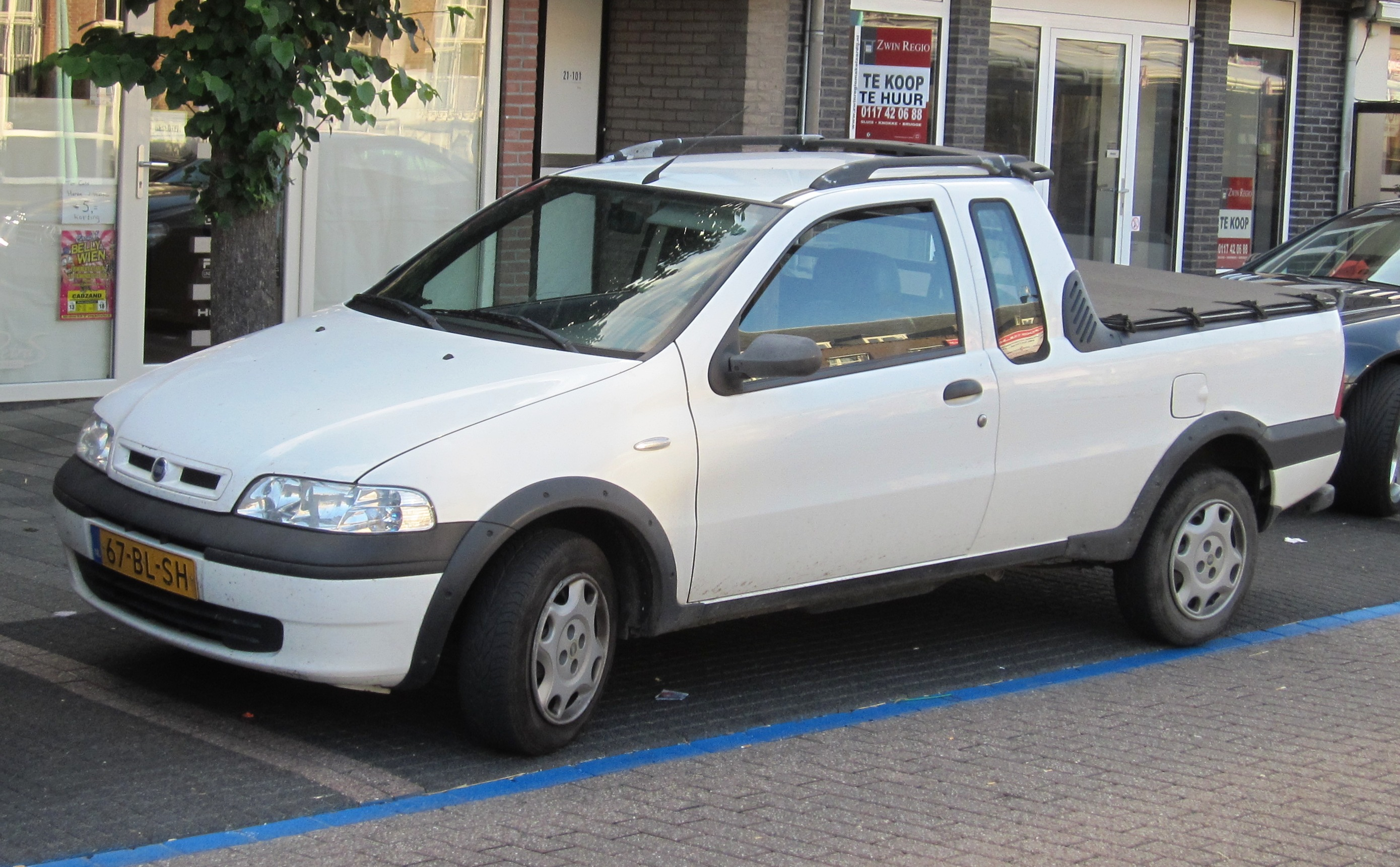
2004 Fiat Strada (extended cab, Europe)

=== 2004 revision ===
The new Mark III was launched in 2004. It has a revised front and interior design taken from the Fiat Palio (and also designed by Giorgetto Giugiaro). Also, a second version of the Strada Adventure was built, with the same features of the Weekend Adventure. It was offered in Europe with the relatively modern 1.9-L JTD diesel engine.

In South Africa, the Strada is offered in four variants: 1.2 Fire MPI EL, 1.6 Torque MPI EL, 1.6 Torque MPI ELX (same as the EL but with colour-coded bumpers and mirrors, electric windows, driver's airbag, and air conditioning), and 1.7 turbo diesel EL. Fiat South Africa also introduced the X-Space model, which stretches the cab by 30 cm (12 in). This model is available in two models, the standard X-Space and the X-Space Adventure (which has similar specifications to the standard 1.6 ELX model). Both X-Space models are powered by the 1.4 Fire MPI engine.

In Europe, it is available only with the 1.3 Multijet 16V diesel engine with 85 hp (63 kW) and Euro 4 standard emission level.

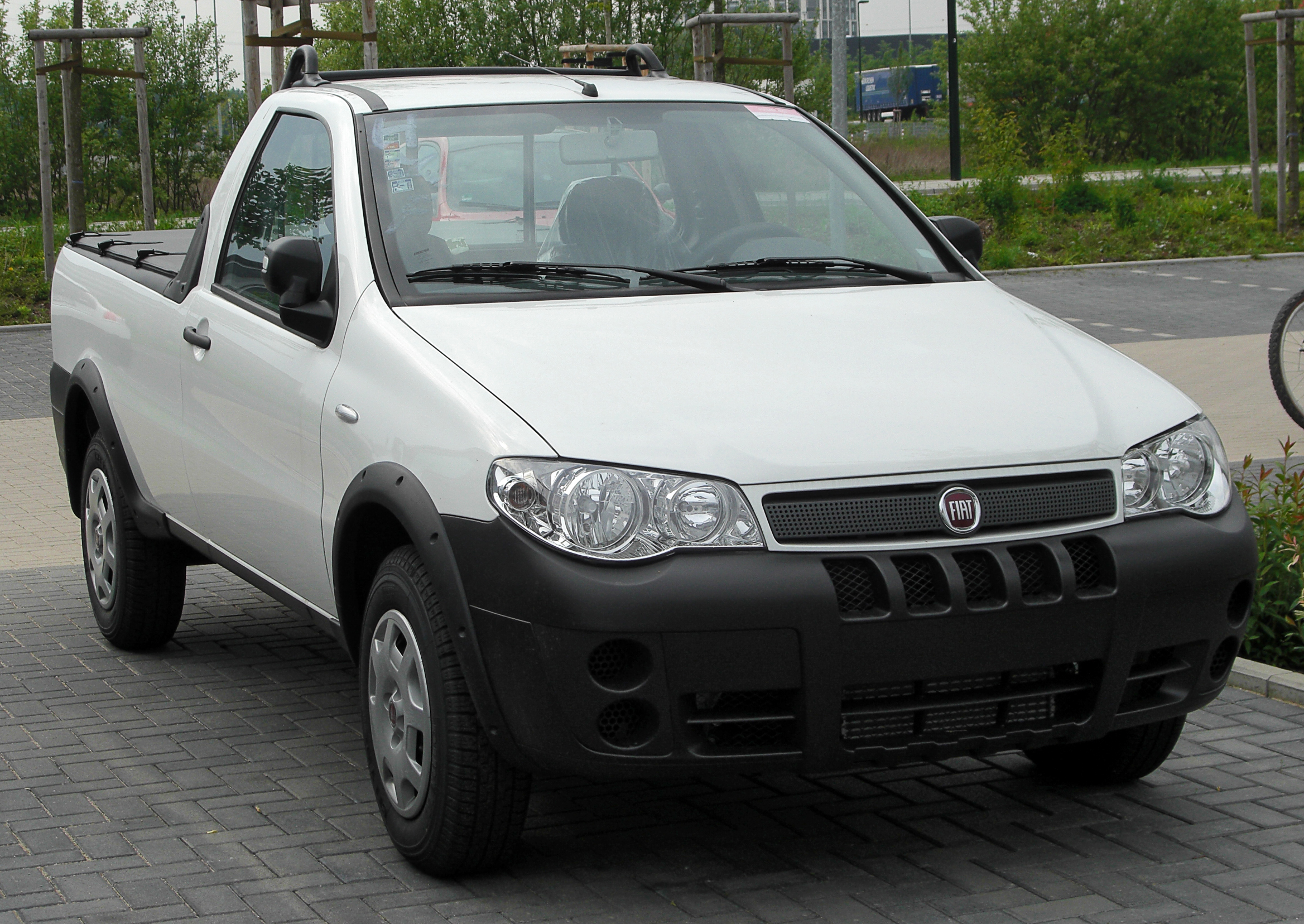
2004 Fiat Strada

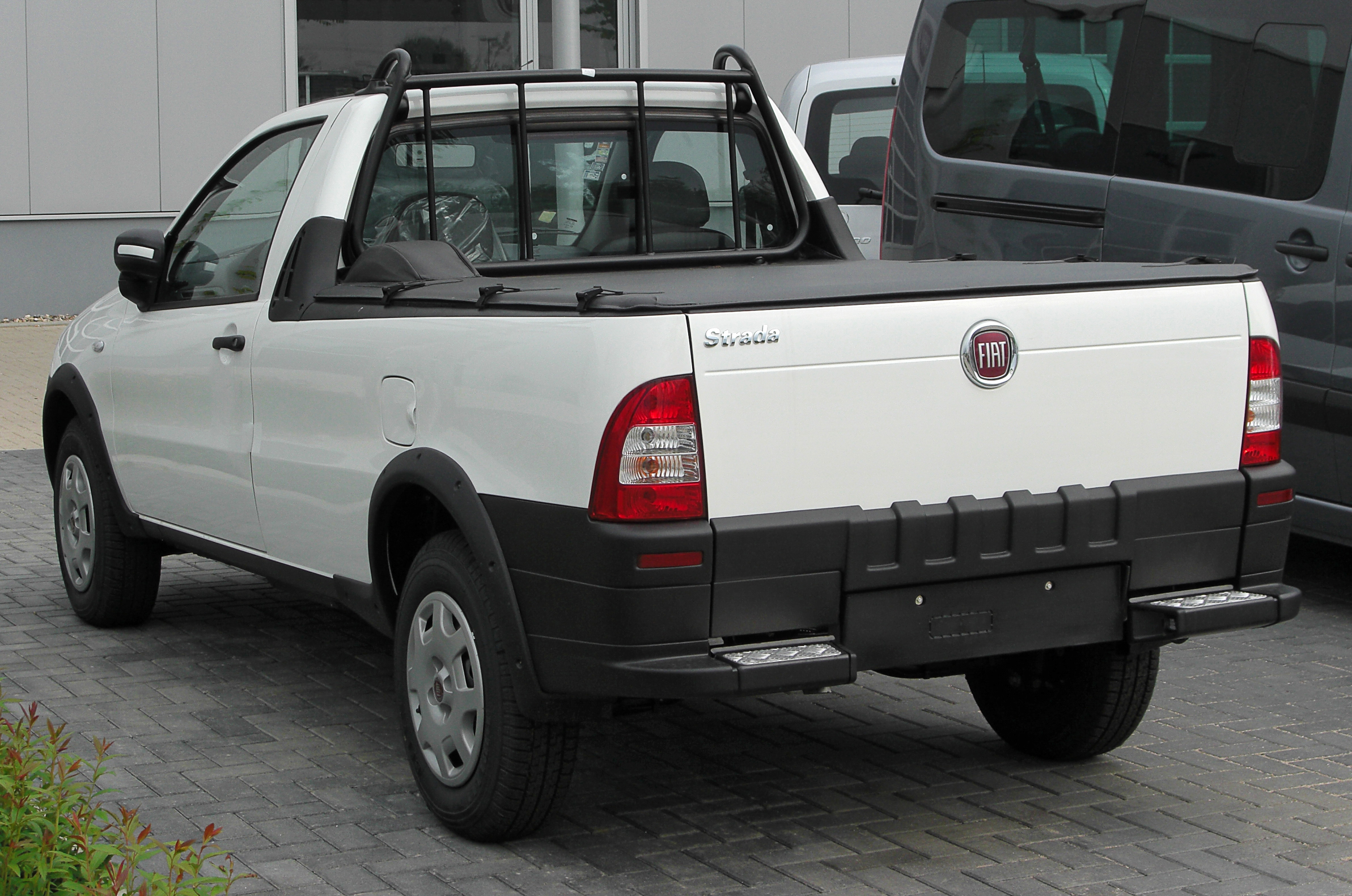
2004 Fiat Strada rear

=== 2009–2013 ===
Unveiled in summer 2009, the all-new Mark IV model was put on sale in the end of 2009. Whilst the model shares its name with the previous Strada, a large number of its components are new, including a new bodyshell. For the rest of the South America, the new Strada was introduced in mid-2010. The design is inspired by the Fiat Grande Punto with many elements similar to the latest versions of the family Palio and Siena. The fourth-generation Strada is built in four different versions: Working, the basic version, Trekking, with more goodies, the Sporting for sportier style with aero kit body style, and the Adventure with a locking differential dedicated to off-road use. In 2010, Fiat do Brazil introduced a new double-cab version (also called Strada Cabina Dupla) with four seats, but maintaining the same wheelbase.

The engines used are the Fiat 1.4-L 16V Fire Flex (85 PS) and the 1.8-L 8-V Ecotec Flex (114 PS). For diesel, the Fiat 1.3-L 16V Multijet unit with 87 PS (64 kW; 86 hp) is also available.

The Fiat Strada was relaunched for Italy and other selected European markets in 2012.

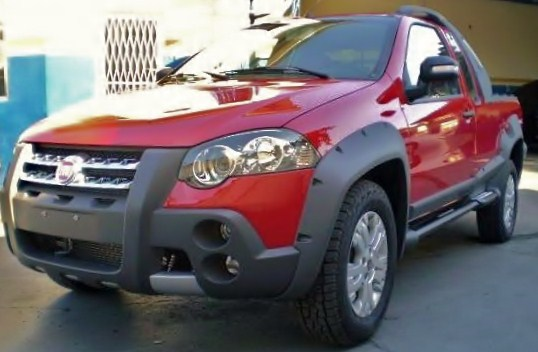
2009 Fiat Strada Adventure

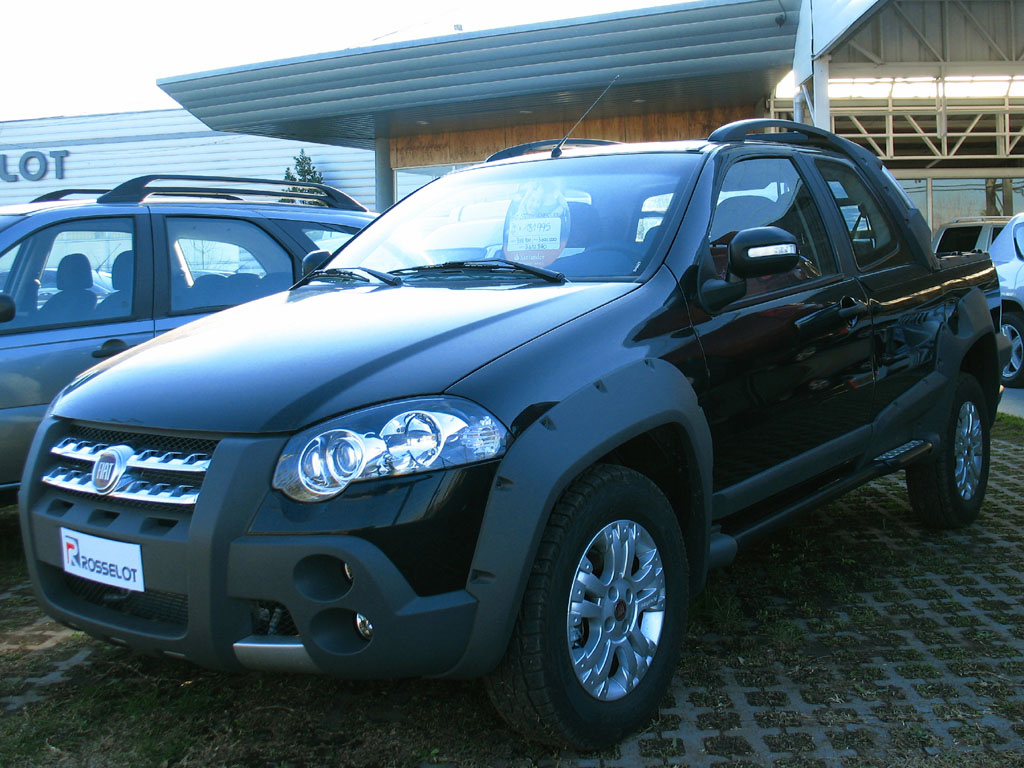
2010 Fiat Strada Adventure

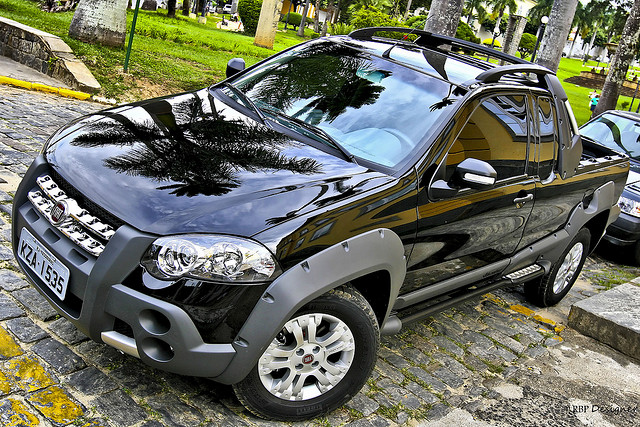
2012 Fiat Strada Adventure

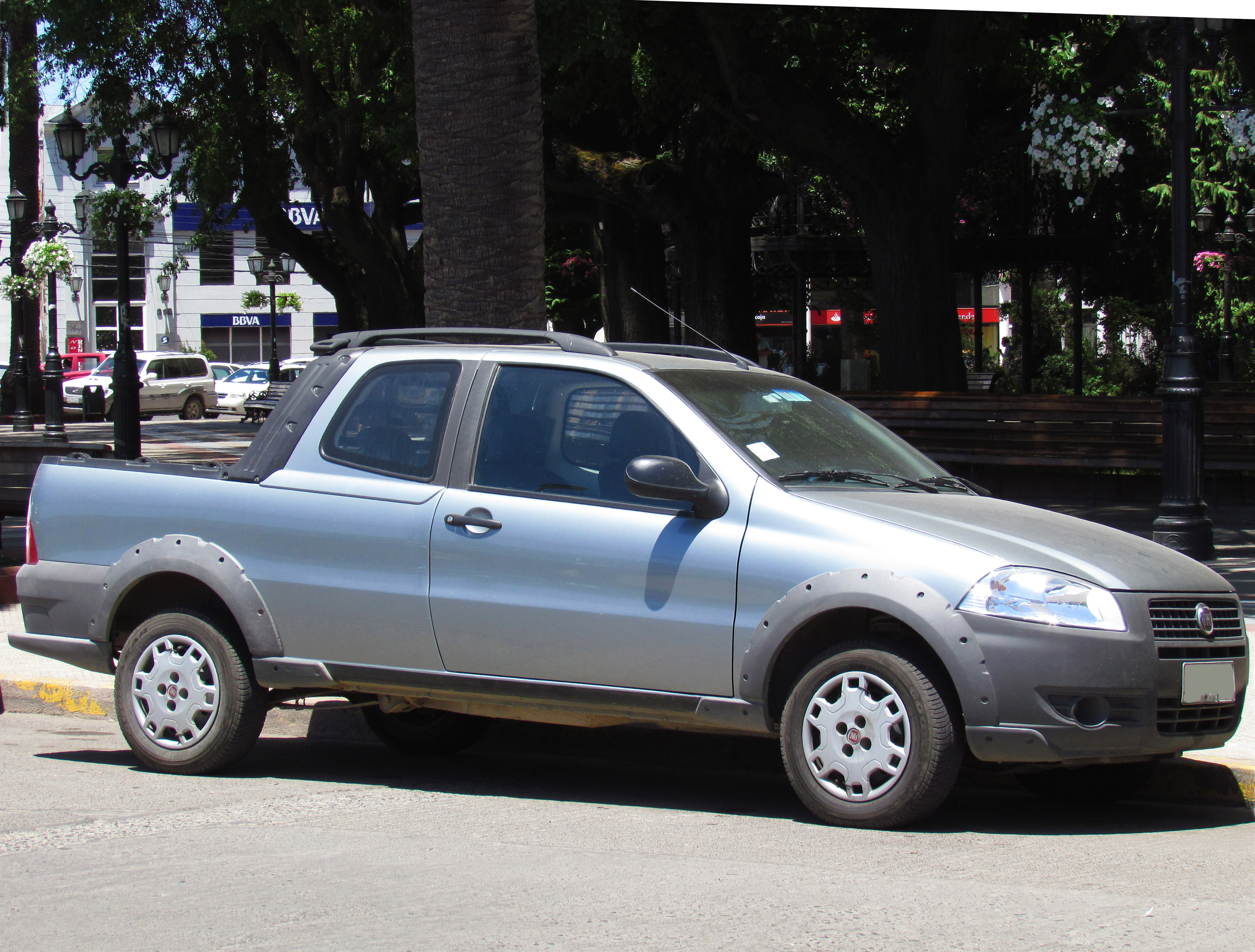
2011 Fiat Strada Working in double-cab version

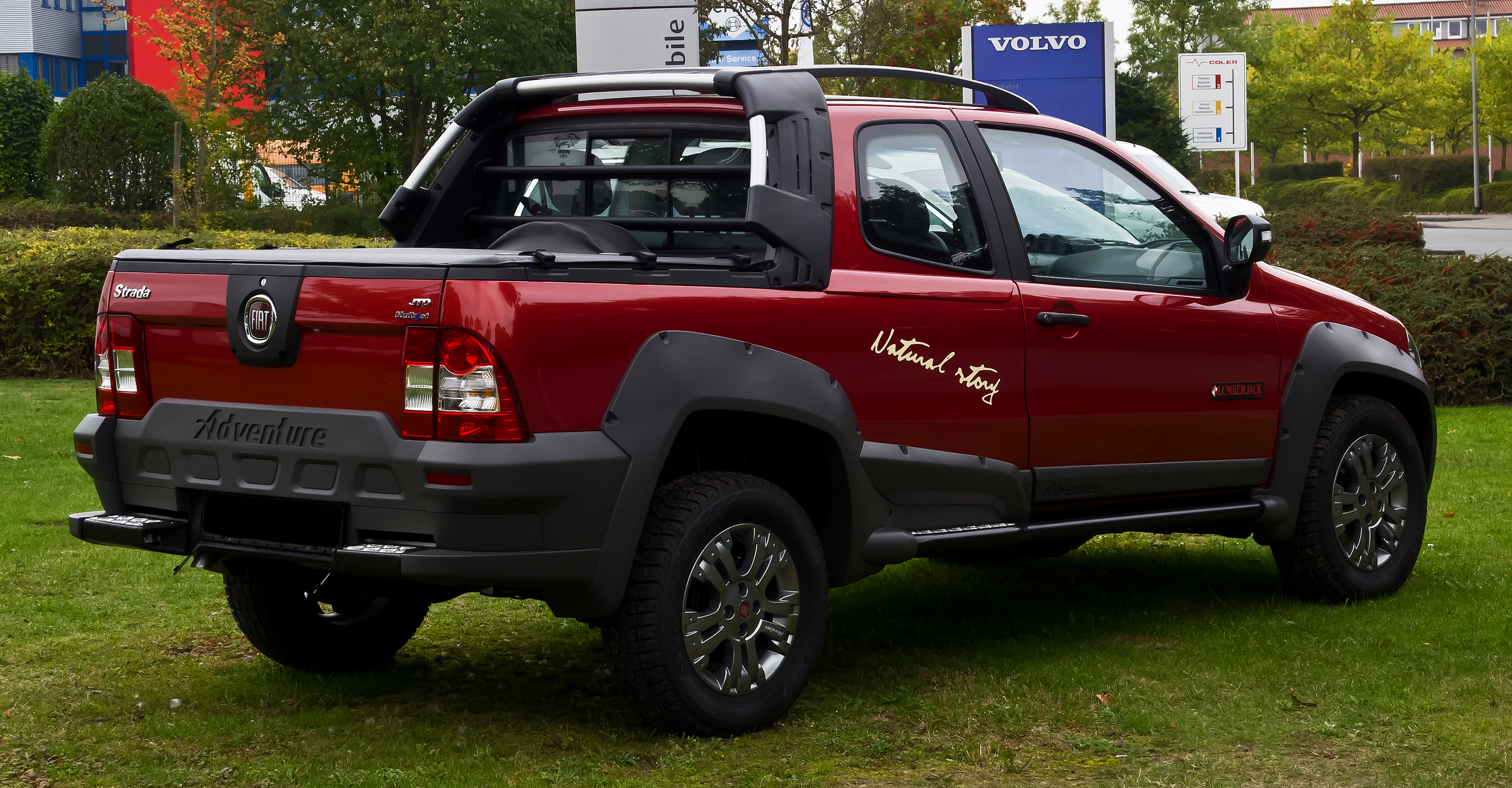
2012 Fiat Strada Adventure rear

=== 2013–2021 ===
At the end of 2013, Fiat unveiled the latest facelift of the Strada (as a model year 2014) based on the 2009 version. The new Strada introduced a new front fascia and new rear lights, and the double-cab version is available with the suicide-style rear doors. Three versions are sold in South America: Working, Trekking and Adventure with four different body styles.

For the 2015 model year, the Fiat Strada was rebadged by Ram Trucks for the Mexican market as the Ram 700.

In 2018, total sales of the Fiat Strada in the Brazilian market surpassed 1.4 million of units.

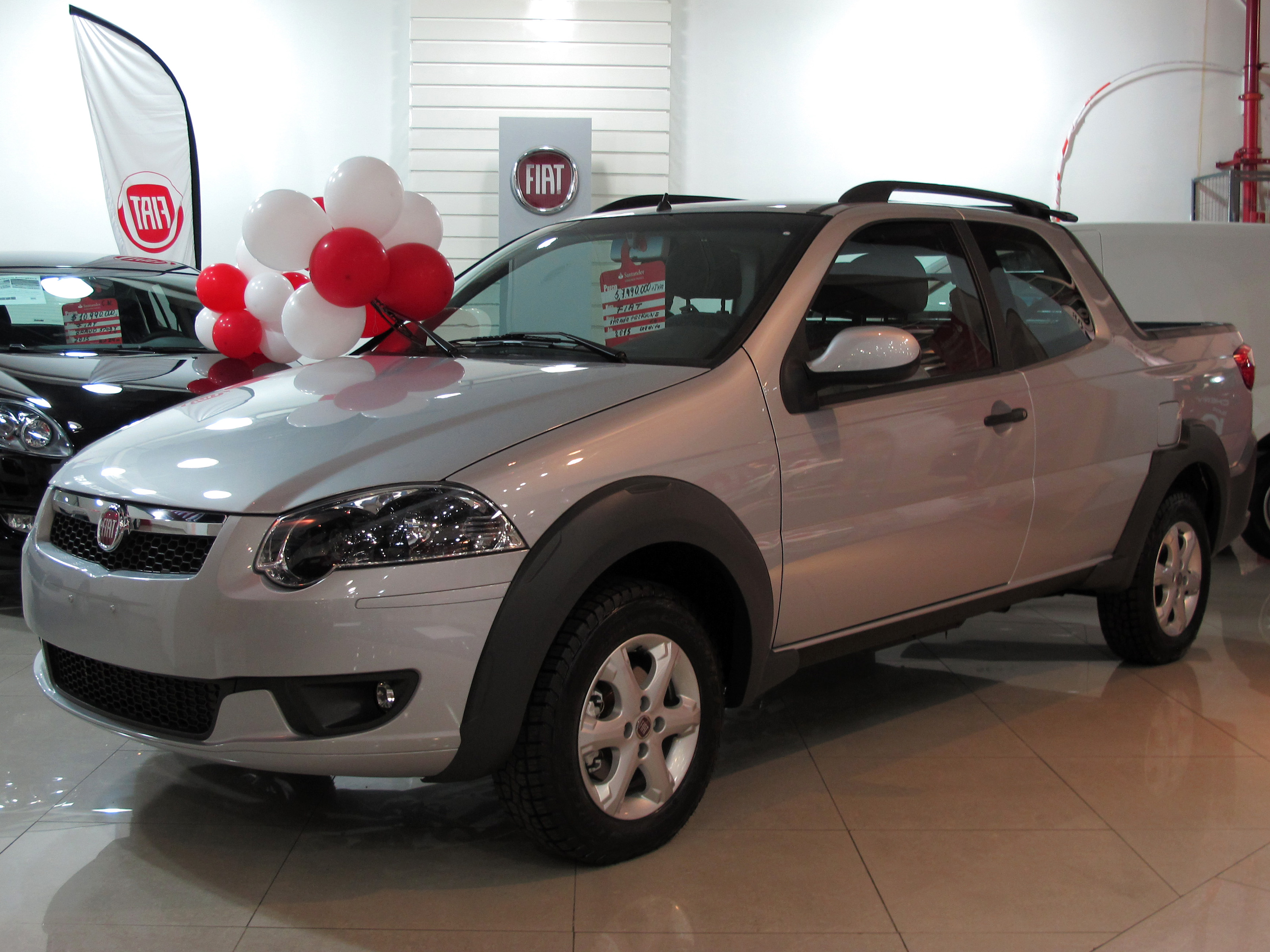
2015 Fiat Strada Trekking

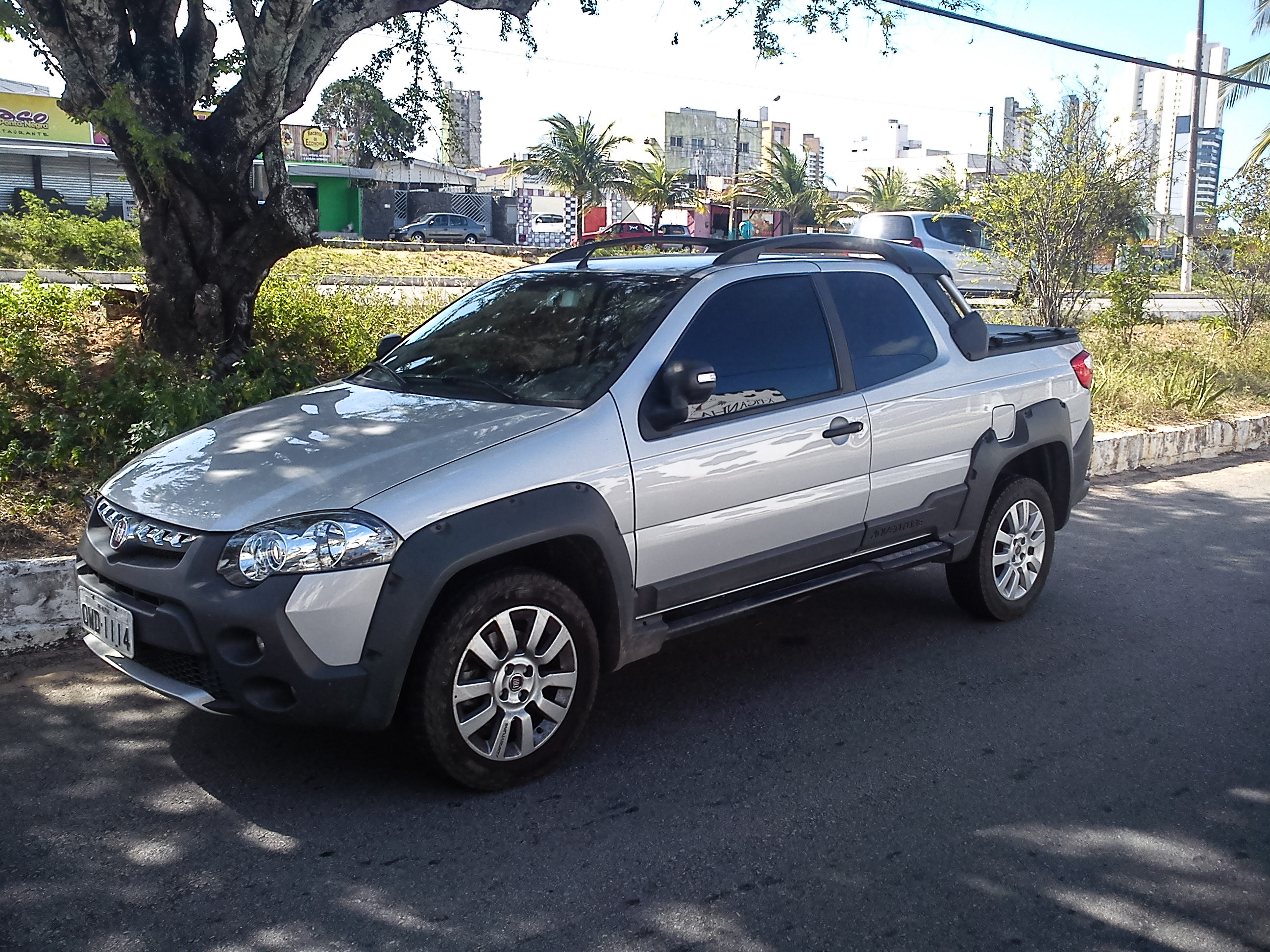
2015 Fiat Strada Adventure

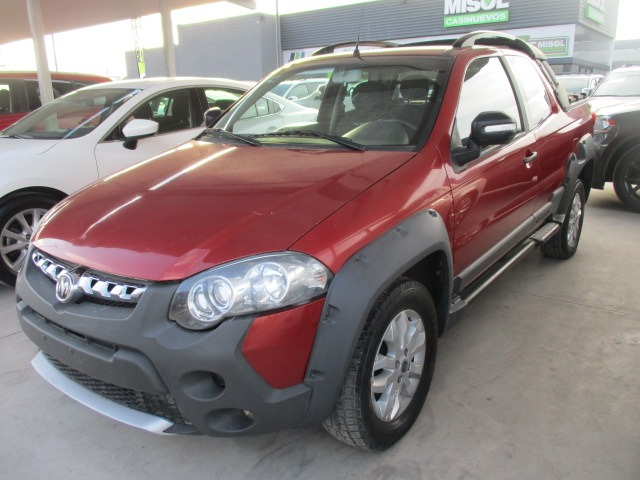
RAM 700 Adventure

== Second generation (281; 2020) ==
Second generation
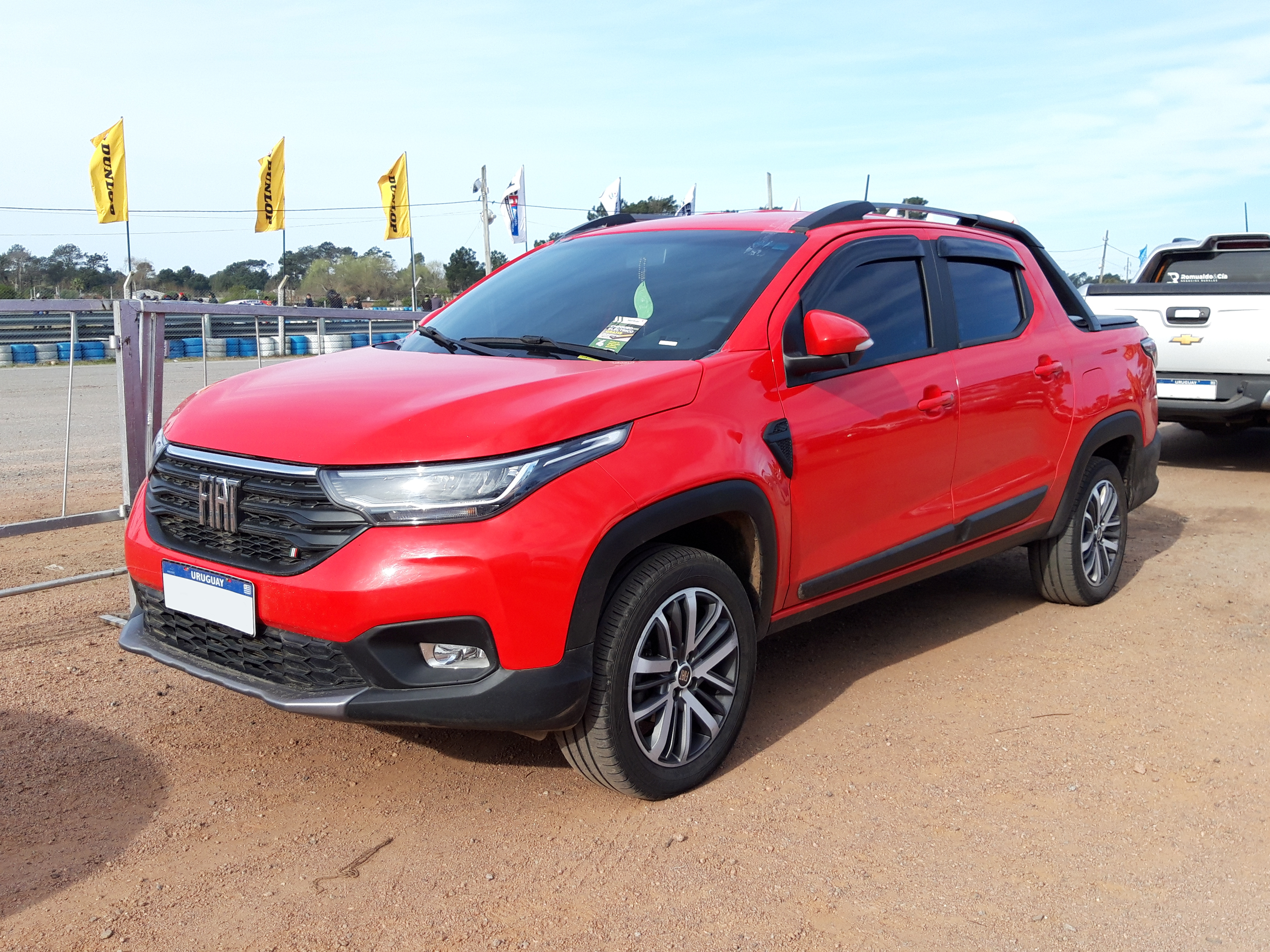

Overview
- Model code: 281
- Also called: RAM 700 (Mexico)
- Production: 2020–present
- Assembly: Brazil: Betim, Minas Gerais

Body and chassis
- Platform: MC-P
- Related: Fiat Cronos; Fiat Argo; Fiat Pulse

Powertrain
- Engine: Petrol: 1.0 L Fiat Firefly T200 turbo I3; 1.3 L Fiat Firefly I4; 1.4 L Fiat Fire I4
- Transmission: 5-speed manual CVT

Dimensions
- Wheelbase: 2,737 mm (107.8 in)
- Length: 4,474 mm (176.1 in)
- Width: 1,732 mm (68.2 in)
- Height: 1,585 mm (62.4 in)

The second generation of the Fiat Strada (codeproject 281) was presented on June 26, 2020 in Brazil and is based on the new MC-P modular platform derived from the Fiat Argo with the front MacPherson suspension and part of the cabin taken from the Fiat Mobi model and the rear suspension taken from the Brazilian Fiat Fiorino (327). For the first time the Strada was produced in the double cab 4-door version with 5-seats.

The second generation of Fiat Strada introduce the large silver-colored Fiat front logo replacing the previous one, a small Italian flag inserted in the grid and LED light clusters. The side and tail, on the other hand, appear more classic, with the possibility of choosing between the two and four-door versions featuring a different capacity: 720 kg and 1,354 liters for the first and 650 kg and 844 liters for the second. In order to ensure maximum mobility even on rough surfaces, the raised structure allows the car to lift from the ground by 211 mm and a front angle of attack of 24 degrees. The interior reproduces some of the contents of the Fiat Uno (327) produced in Brazil, even if some secondary controls are modified. In addition to the display at the center of the instrumentation, there is also an UConnect 5 infotainment with 7-inch touchscreen, bluetooth, wireless, compatible with Apple CarPlay and Android Auto.

Starting on 18 November 2020, the rebadged RAM 700 saw a new generation for the Mexican market. It is offered in the SLT (regular and crew cab), Bighorn, and Laramie trim levels.

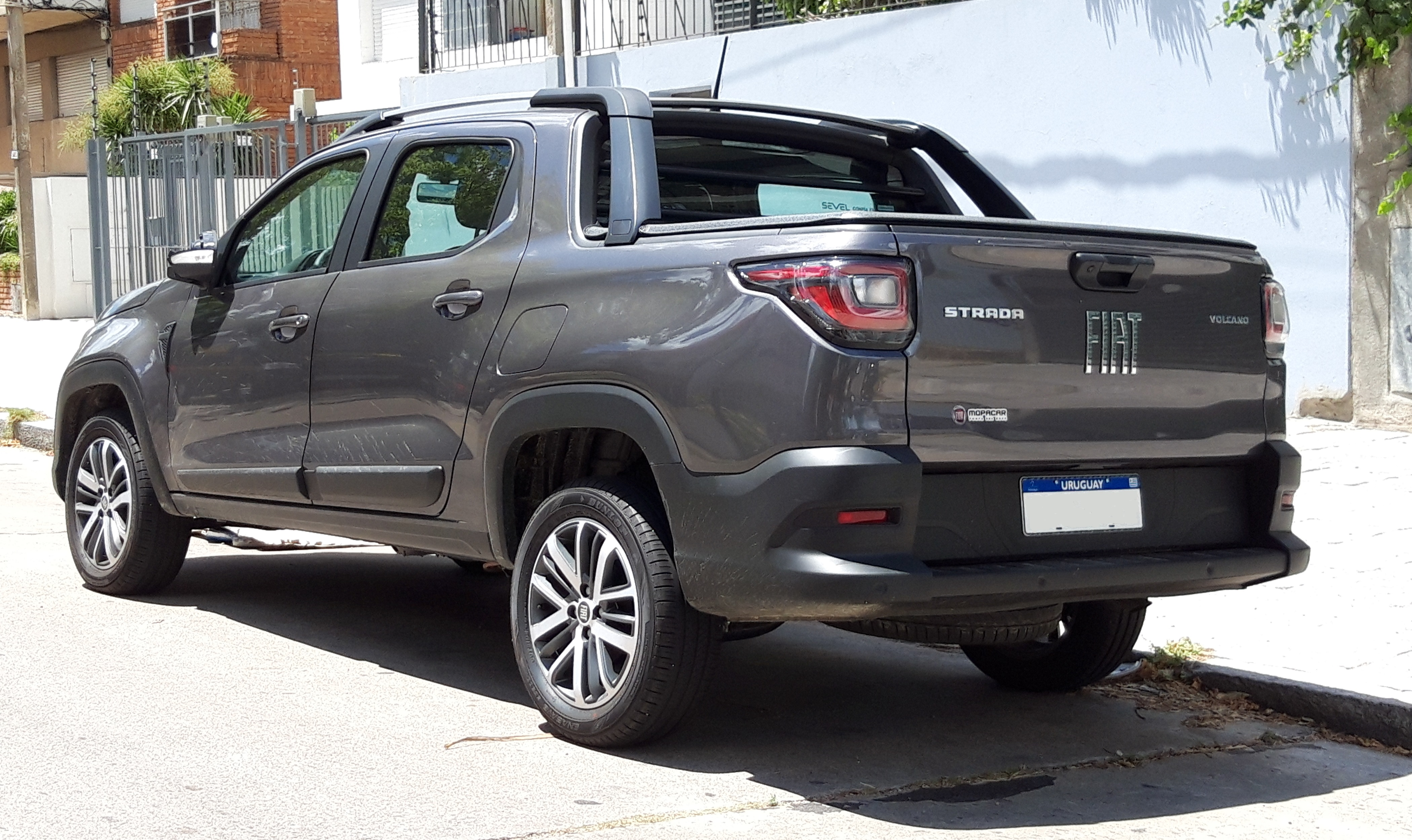
Fiat Strada Volcano Rear view

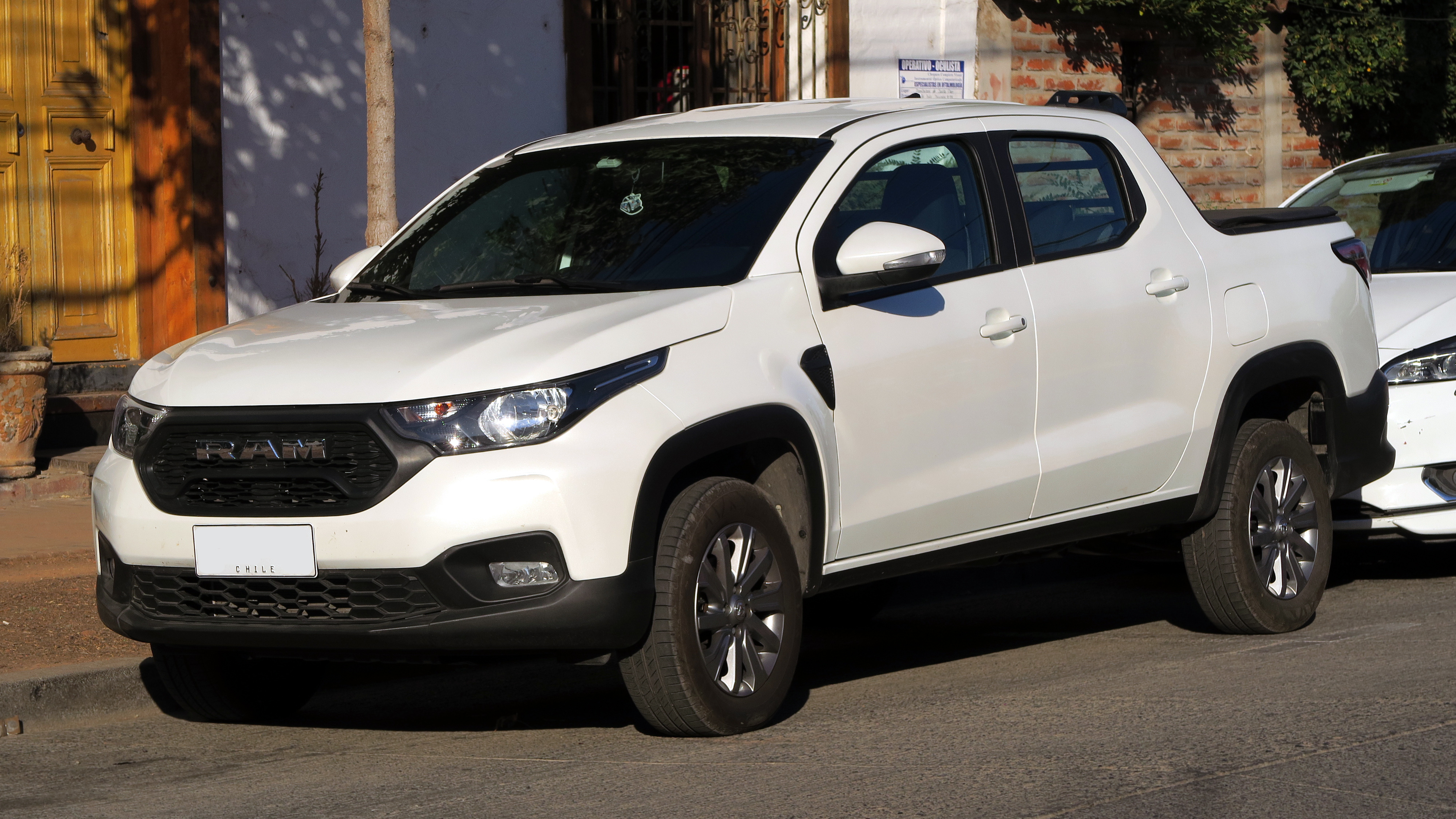
RAM 700

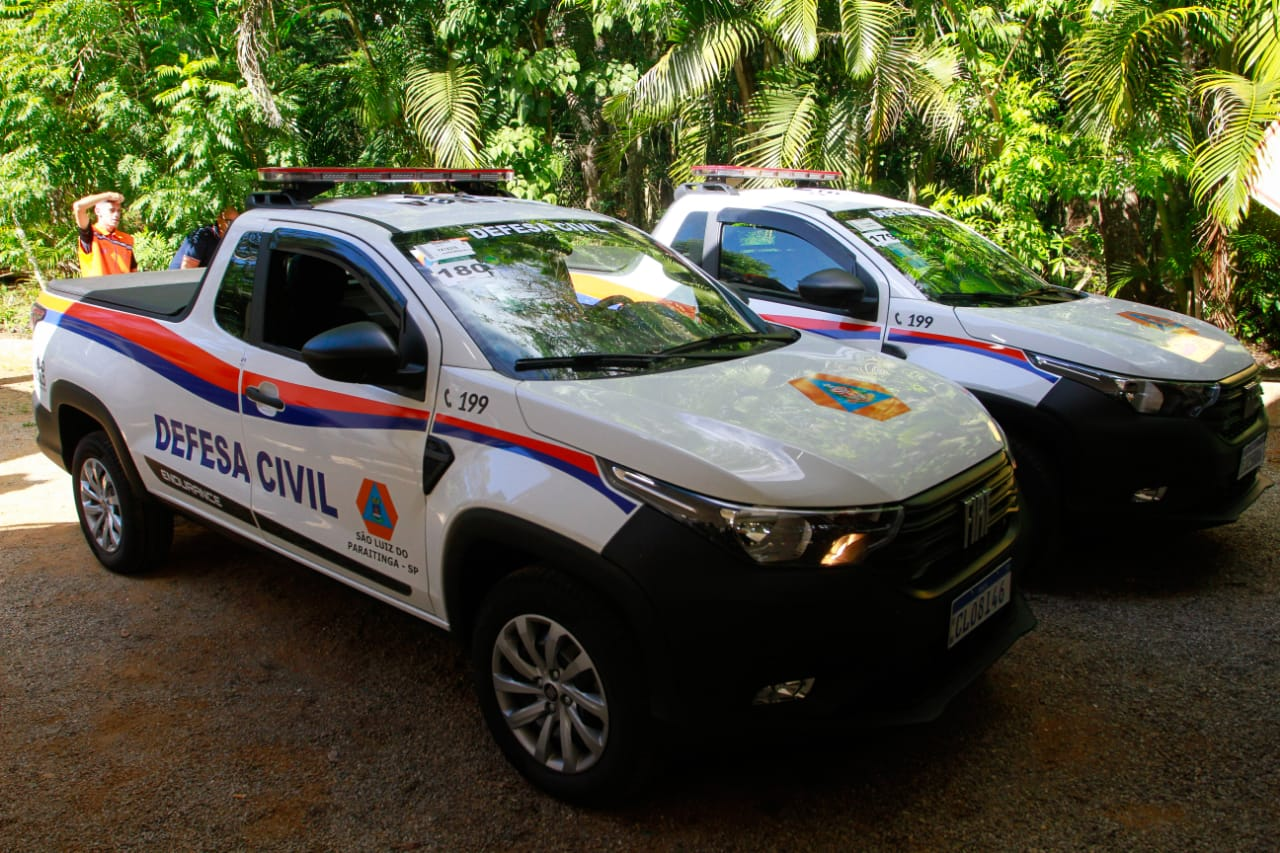
Fiat Strada plus cab (front)

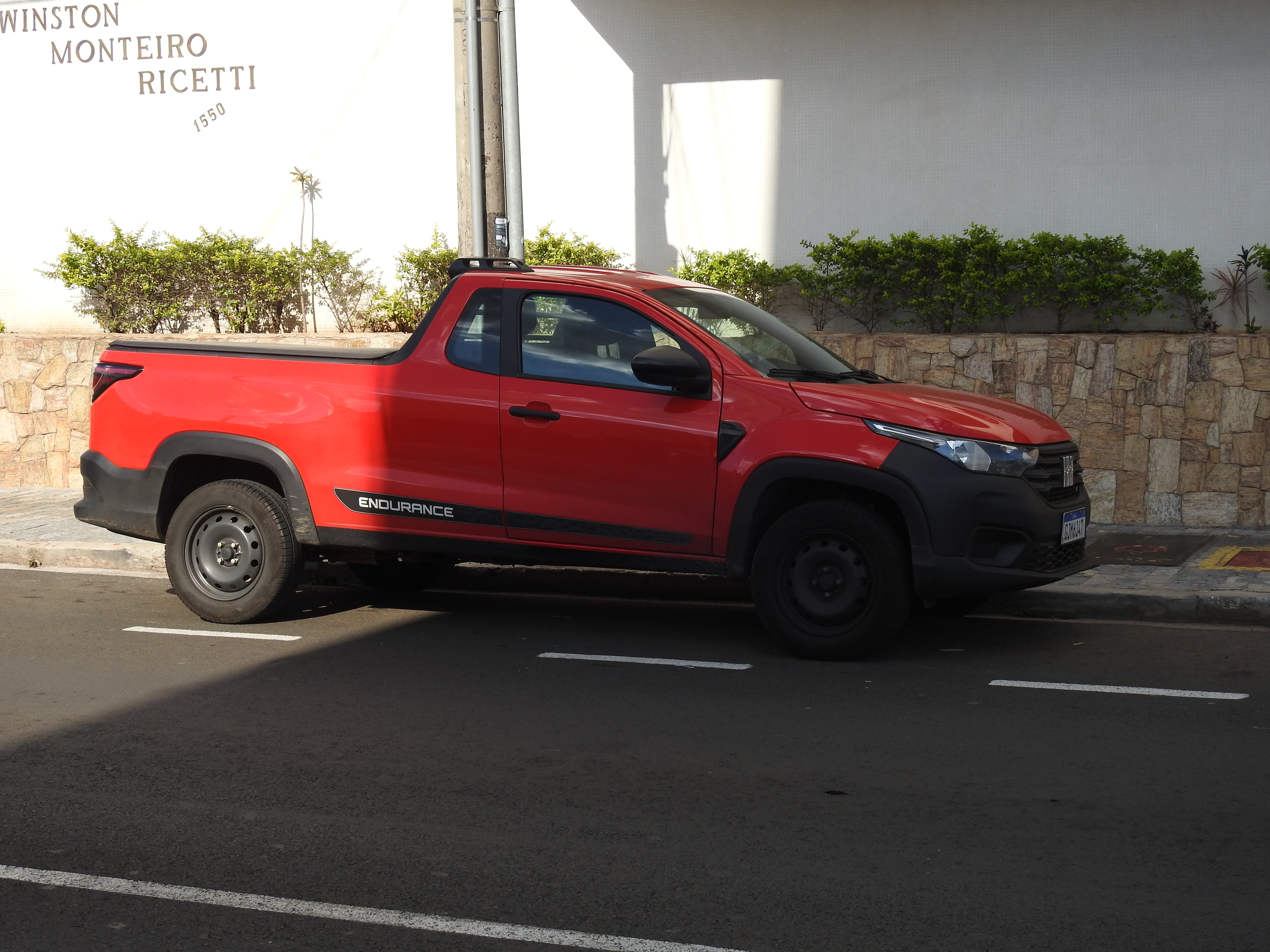
Fiat Strada plus cab (single cab)

=== 2024 facelift ===
2024 Strada Ultra (facelift)

The Strada facelift was introduced in Brazil in August 2023, adding revised styling, a new top-spec Ultra version, and the 1.0-litre Turbo 200 Flex engine, which produces 130 PS (96 kW) on ethanol and 125 PS (92 kW) on petrol.

=== Engine ===
The range of engines consist in the Fiat 1.4 Fire EVO Flex 8 valve (85 HP petrol and 88 HP ethanol) of the Endurance versions and the 1.3 Firefly Flex 8 valve (101 HP petrol and 109 HP ethanol) of the Freedom, Volcano and Ranch, both with the five-speed manual gearbox gears and simulated 7-speed cvt-type automatic transmission and the E-Locker traction control system. As of August 2023, the Ultra and Ranch versions will feature the new 1.0-liter gasoline/ethanol turbo engine, producing 125/130 hp and 20.4 kg⋅m (200 N⋅m) coupled to a CVT gearbox that simulates 7 gears.

=== Safety ===
The Strada has 4 airbags, electronic stability control (ESC) Ventilated Front disc brakes and drum brakes in the rear.

The Latin American Strada with airbags and ESC received 1 star from Latin NCAP 3.0 in 2022 (similar to Euro NCAP 2014)

Latin NCAP 3.0 test results Ram 700 Double cabin + 4 Airbags (2022, similar to Euro NCAP 2014)
Test	Points	%
Overall:	1 /5 stars	
Adult occupant:	16.56	41%
Child occupant:	25.95	53%
Pedestrian:	19.31	40%
Safety assist:	21.00	49%

Latin NCAP 3.0 test results Ram 700 Single Cabin + 2 Airbags (2022, similar to Euro NCAP 2014)
Test	Points	%
Overall:	1 /5 stars	
Adult occupant:	18.98	47%
Child occupant:	4.86	22%
Pedestrian:	19.31	40%
Safety assist:	18.00	42%

Latin NCAP 3.0 test results Fiat Strada Double cabin + 4 Airbags (2022, similar to Euro NCAP 2014)
Test	Points	%
Overall:	1 /5 stars	
Adult occupant:	16.56	41%
Child occupant:	25.95	53%
Pedestrian:	19.31	40%
Safety assist:	21.00	49%

Latin NCAP 3.0 test results Fiat Strada Single Cabin + 2 Airbags (2022, similar to Euro NCAP 2014)
Test	Points	%
Overall:	1 /5 stars	
Adult occupant:	18.98	47%
Child occupant:	4.86	22%
Pedestrian:	19.31	40%
Safety assist:	18.00	42%

== Sales ==
Year	Brazil	Argentina	Mexico	
Year	Brazil	Argentina	Strada	Ram 700
2006	42,344		78	
2007	61,328	1,386	381	
2008	71,929	833	429	
2009	89,968	1,272	490	
2010	116,794	3,292	540	
2011	118,579	7,051	33	
2012	117,455	7,659	229	
2013	122,904	7,225	1,236	
2014	153,130	5,652	716	
2015	98,631	16,299		8,159
2016	59,449	13,882		11,940
2017	32,659	7,078		9,815
2018	67,227	5,799		9,797
2019	75,973	2,721		7,483
2020	80,030	2,408		8,011
2021	109,099	3,728		5,051
2022	112,456	3,872		8,087
2023	120,608			13,942
2024	144,664			
2025	142,903			17,349

== See also ==
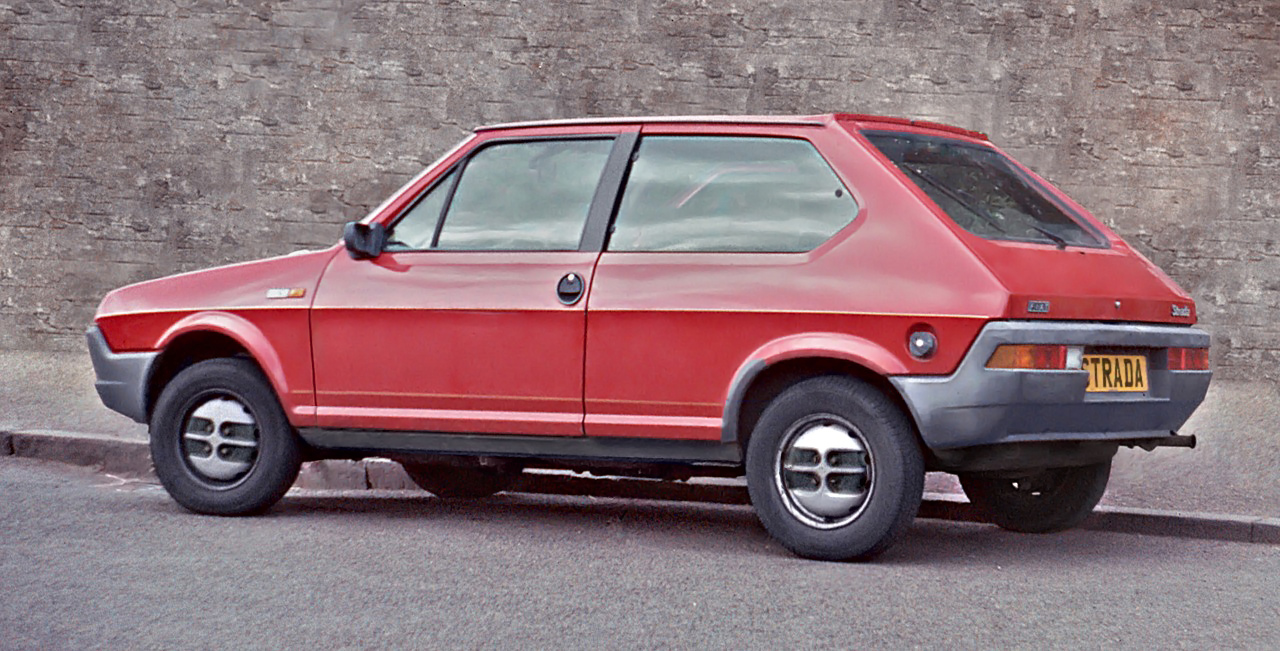
The 1980s Fiat Ritmo was sold as the Fiat Strada in some markets which did not receive the 1990s Strada described here.

- Fiat Ritmo — a European hatchback, produced from 1978–88, marketed worldwide, and sold as the "Fiat Strada" in most English-speaking countries
- Fiat Palio — the recent Strada's base car
- Fiat Albea
- Fiat Siena
