= Olivier François =

French businessman (born 1961)

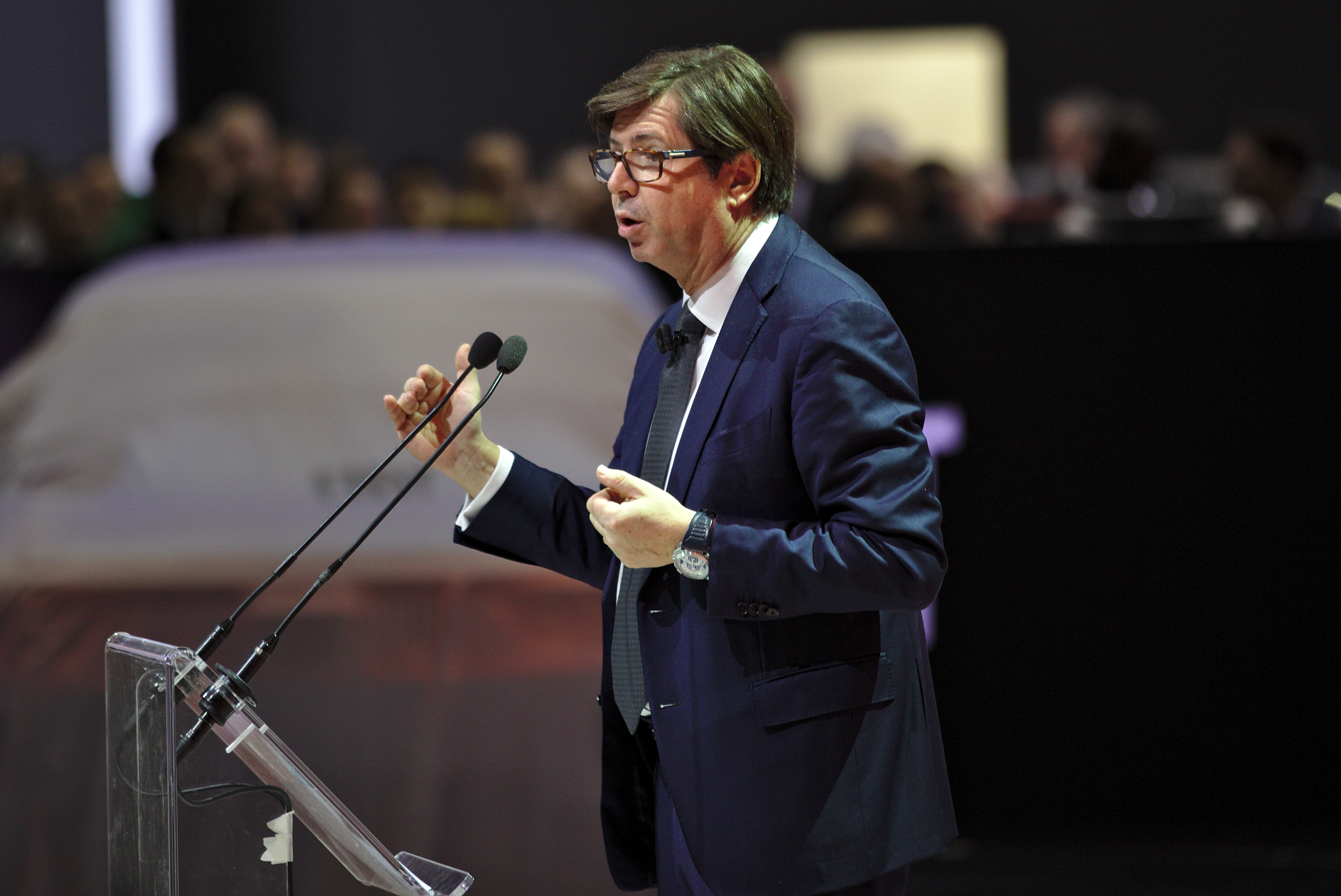
- Born: 4 October 1961 (age 64); Paris, France
- Education: Dauphine University; Sorbonne University; Sciences Po
- Occupations: President and CEO of Fiat brands (since 2011); Head of Marketing and Communication of the Fiat Group Automobiles (former); CEO of Lancia Spa (former); General Manager Citroën Italy (former)
- Spouse: Arianna Bergamaschi
- Children: 4

Olivier François (4 October 1961) is a French business executive and the CEO of Fiat and Abarth since 2011. He is global chief marketing officer for Stellantis, and a member of the company's Group Executive Council, a position he has held since September 2011. Due to his attention to creativity, he has been referred to as "Chrysler's Don Draper". In 2024, François was inducted into the American Advertising Federation Hall of Fame.

== Early life and education ==
François was born in Paris, and graduated in 1984 from Dauphine University with degrees in management and marketing from CELSA – Sorbonne University (1986) and in Economy and finance from Sciences Po (1988). Prior to starting his career within the automotive industry, he started his own music label in France, later working in the export business. His passion for music, together with poetry and photography, continues to accompany François in his later career, as witnessed by commercials and special projects in which are involved among others, Sting, Shaggy, and Jennifer Lopez.

== Career ==
=== Citroën ===
François entered the car business in 1990 when he was hired by Citroën, quickly climbing the ranks within the organization. In 1999, he was asked by the company to move to Denmark, where he was managing director of Citroën Denmark A/S. In 2001, he was appointed managing director of Citroën Italy.

=== Lancia ===
After four years as the head of Citroën in Italy, willing for a new challenge, François was approached by Sergio Marchionne, then CEO of Fiat Group Automobiles, to later become CEO of Lancia Automobiles SpA.

=== Chrysler ===
In October 2009, after the Fiat Group receiving a 20% stake in Chrysler Group LLC, François was appointed president and chief executive officer of the Chrysler brand. He was also the Lead Marketing Executive at the Chrysler Group, with responsibility for marketing strategies, brand development and advertising for the Chrysler Group (Jeep, Dodge, Chrysler, and RAM Trucks), as well as that of the Fiat Group Automobiles brands (Fiat, Alfa Romeo, Maserati, Abarth, and Lancia).

=== FCA ===
In 2011, François was named chief marketing officer of the FCA Group and head of the Fiat Brand, as well as becoming a member of the Group Executive Council (GEC). Since becoming chief marketing officer, François splits his time between Auburn Hills and FCA's Italian headquarters in Turin. As well as chief marketing officer for the Fiat Chrysler Automobiles Group, he is also president of the Fiat Brand Global.

=== Car models unveiled ===
Under his guidance, FCA have achieved some important results: the iconic 500 enlarged its line up with 500L (in 2012) and 500X (in 2014), consolidating 500 as everlasting and iconic car. During the 2014 Geneve Motor Show an offroad version of Panda, named Cross, was launched: this contributed to keep the model as one of the Italian most sold cars. In 2015, the new Tipo, a compact car assembled at the Tofaş plant in Bursa, Turkey, was launched. It won the Best Buy Car of Europe Award from Autobest, voted by a panel of 26 journalists from 26 European countries.

In 2016, the 124 Spider made its first appearance; it was previously seen at 2015 LA Auto Show. The two passenger roadster recalls for name and exterior styling the Fiat 124 Sport Spider designed by Pininfarina and manufactured from 1966 to 1985. In 2019, the electric Fiat concept Centoventi, translated as hundred and twenty in recognition of the company's 120th anniversary, was unveiled at the Geneve Motor Show. It "reimagines the Fiat Panda supermini as an electric car for the 21st century". The launch of the Panda Trussardi in 2019 was accompanied by a communication campaign that celebrates its style, changing the rules of automotive communications and positioning the new car as a fashion item. Panda Trussardi features in the video clip of Ava Max's new single "Torn", and the spot is simply a cut from the video clip. The new commercial was directed by Joseph Kahn who directed video clips for artists such as Lady Gaga, Britney Spears, Taylor Swift, Sting, and Shaggy.

=== Vatican Concert ===
François led the efforts organizing the Vatican City's first-ever live concert held in St. Peter’s Square on September 13, 2025, hosting an audience of over 250,000 to celebrate the Vatican’s 2025 Jubilee Year. Artists including Pharrell Williams, Andrea Bocelli, and Karol G performed, with Kimbal Musk orchestrating a 3,000-drone light show over the Vatican during the event.

== Advertisements and campaigns ==
=== Super Bowl commercials ===
François has often used the Super Bowl commercials renowned as one of the most expensive advertising slots in the world. In 2011, he conceived the Eminem-starring Chrysler Super Bowl commercial "Imported from Detroit", a 2-minute homage to the rebirth of the automotive industry within Detroit. The ad won an Emmy Award as "Outstanding Commercial". In 2012, he chose Clint Eastwood for a new Chrysler campaign named "Halftime in America", which was described by the New York Post as "one of the few touchdowns in last night's advertising Super Bowl" and by CNN Money as "king of the Super Bowl spots".

For the 2014 Super Bowl, François employed Bob Dylan as the testimonial for the launch of the new Chrysler 200. The campaign went further than promoting the car, the brand clearly tried to establish a broader message than the fact that it is associated with Detroit. For the 2015 Super Bowl, a new commercial for Fiat 500X was launched, named "the FIAT Blue Pill" campaign. In the spot, a blue pill transforms a classic 500 into the 500X crossover. This commercial was described as "a clever and humorous way to introduce the 500X".

For the 2020 Super Bowl, Francois enlisted Bill Murray, who appeared in his first commercial ever for the Jeep® brand, to recreate scenes from the iconic 1993 film Groundhog Day with the Jeep Gladiator. The spot won the coveted USA Today Ad Meter and was nominated for an Primetime Emmy Award for "Outstanding Commercial". In 2021, François landed music legend Bruce Springsteen for the Jeep brand's Super Bowl commercial. The two-minute TV spot, starring Springsteen in his first commercial for a brand, was a decade in the making, according François.

=== Other commercials ===
In 2008, François dedicated a TV commercial for Lancia to Nobel Prize winners. The campaign features some of the major Nobel Prize winners including Lech Wałęsa, Frederik Willem De Klerk, Mikhail Gorbachev, Tenzin Gyatso XIV Dalai Lama and Aung San Suu Kyi. For the 2014 launch campaign of the Dodge Durango, he cooperated with Paramount Pictures and Will Ferrell (as the fictional anchor Ron Burgundy). The commercial was used as marketing campaign for the release of the film Anchorman 2: The Legend Continues. In 2016, he worked again with Paramount Pictures, this time cooperating with the star of the film Zoolander 2, Derek Zoolander (played by Ben Stiller) to promote the Fiat 500X. The new spot entitled "Selfie" directed by Jeff Mann was screened for the first time at the Golden Globes ceremony. The campaign went on to receive a gold award for entertainment by the Clio Awards

2017 was 60th birthday of Fiat 500: to mark such a special occasion for the brand François enrolled the Oscar winning American actor and producer, Adrien Brody. The film debuted the celebrative special series, the 500 Anniversario. In 2018, under François supervision, Fiat choose Christopher Lloyd for the new 500X commercial. Lloyd reprised his role of Back to The Future‘s Doc Emmett Brown to transport a couple from the 60s to the present days, transforming their classic Fiat into the Fiat 500X modern-day incarnation.

In 2019 FCA involved Sting and Shaggy for the new 500X campaign, called "Just one lifetime", as part of brand 120th anniversary. The campaign was initially conceived as a music video treatment, and it was then re-cut as a 90-second spot. The song was included in the album [‘44/876’], winning the 2018 Grammy Award, as Best Reggae Album. Francois has also worked with both Bono on campaigns for the FIAT, Ram and Jeep® brands creating awareness for global pandemics, including COVID-19, in addition to Leonardo DiCaprio to promote awareness of climate change through the FIAT brand's all-new, all-electric Fiat 500.

== Personal life ==
François married Italian pop singer Arianna Bergamaschi in 2014. He has four sons.

== Awards ==
- 2012, Automotive News "Automotive Marketer of the Year".
- 2012, Adweek "Grand Brand Genius".
- 2012, Ad Age "Marketer of the Year".
- 2014, Automotive News "Automotive Marketer of the Year".
- 2015, Forbes "Most Influential CMO" at No. 4.
- 2017, Mediapost/Nielsen "Automotive CMO of the Year".
- 2018, Billboard's "Powerlist".
- 2024, American Advertising Federation Hall of Fame.
