= Abarth 500 =

Abarth 500 may refer to the following variants of the Fiat 500:

- Abarth 695 SS, produced from 1964 to 1971
- Fiat Cinquecento Abarth, based on the Fiat Cinquecento (500 in Italian) from 1991
- Abarth 500 (2008), produced from 2008 on
- Abarth 500 (2023), produced from 2023 on
