= Fiat 500e =

Italian battery-electric hatchback

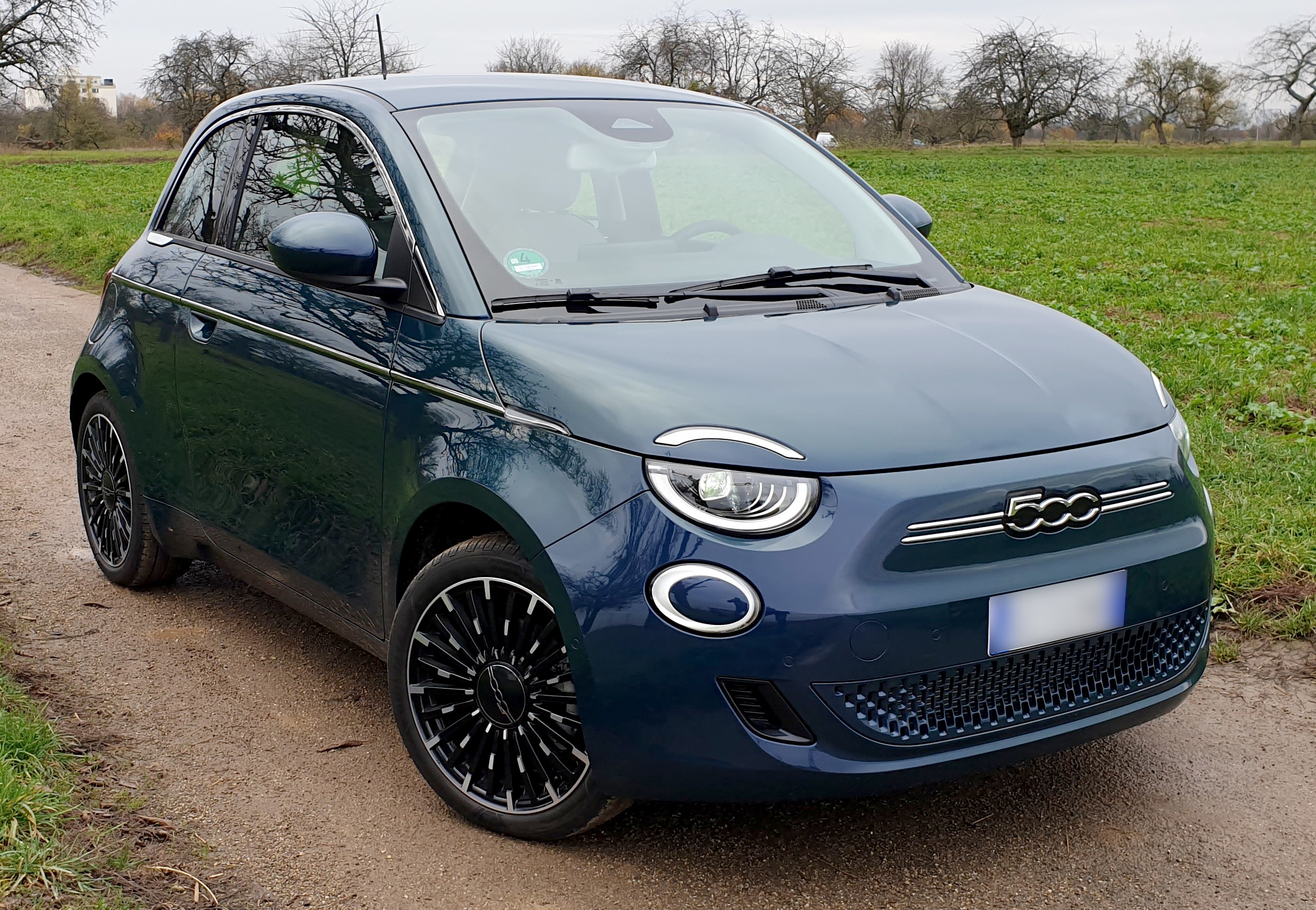

Overview
- Manufacturer: Fiat (Note: FCA Italy (2020–2023); Stellantis Europe (2023–present))
- Model code: 332
- Production: February 2020 –present
- Model years: 2020–present
- Assembly: Italy: Mirafiori, Turin
- Designer: Lorenzo Battisti, Dario Pellegrino at Centro Stile Fiat

Body and chassis
- Class: City car (A)
- Body style: 3-door hatchback; 3-door cabriolet; 4-door hatchback
- Platform: STLA Small

Powertrain
- Engine: 1.0 L GSE FireFly I3 mild hybrid
- Electric motor: GKN Automotive G400 IPMS interior permanent-magnet synchronous motor
- Power output: 70 kW (95 PS; 94 hp) (24 kWh battery); 87 kW (118 PS; 117 hp) (42 kWh battery); 114 kW (155 PS; 153 hp) (Abarth)
- Transmission: 6-speed manual (mild hybrid)
- Battery: 24 kWh lithium-ion; 42 kWh lithium-ion
- Electric range: 185 km (115 mi) WLTP (24 kWh); 320 km (199 mi) WLTP (42 kWh)
- Plug-in charging: DC: 50 kW (24 kWh battery); 85 kW (42 kWh battery); 400 V 3-Phase AC: 11 kW; 230 V AC: 6.6 kW; 120 V AC: 3.3 kW

Dimensions
- Wheelbase: 2,322 mm (91.4 in)
- Length: 3,632 mm (143.0 in)
- Width: 1,683 mm (66.3 in)
- Height: 1,527 mm (60.1 in)
- Kerb weight: 1,255–1,405 kg (2,767–3,097 lb)

Chronology
- Predecessor: Fiat 500e (2013)

The Fiat 500e (project 332), also known as the 500 elettrica, is either a battery-electric car or mild-hybrid engine car by Italian manufacturer Fiat as the third generation of its 500 city cars, following the original 500 (1957–1975) and second-generation 500 (2007–2024). The third-generation 500e is manufactured at the Mirafiori plant in Turin, Italy, starting in 2020, and was sold alongside the second-generation 500, which was manufactured in Tychy, Poland until 2024. It was scheduled to be launched at the Geneva Motor Show but that event was canceled due to the COVID-19 pandemic; it was launched on 4 March 2020 in Milan.

The 500e has a 320 km (199 mi) range on the European WLTP combined test cycle, and achieves 400 km (249 mi) on that test's urban cycle, which is generally favourable toward electric vehicles (EVs). Most versions of the car are powered by an 87 kW (117 hp) electric traction motor, fed by a 42 kWh lithium-ion battery pack.

== Overview ==
Previously, FCA had assembled a different model, also named the 500e, from December 2012 to June 2019 at its Toluca Car Assembly plant in Mexico; this earlier 500e was a BEV derived from the second-generation 2007 Fiat 500 and was sold exclusively in a limited number of states within the United States market.

Sergio Marchionne called for FCA to pivot towards electric and hybrid automobiles starting in 2018, including an all-new electric 500e by 2020. FCA showed the Fiat Centoventi concept at the Geneva Motor Show in March 2019; the Centoventi concept previewed what automotive industry believed to be a future BEV version of the Fiat Panda, which in turn was expected to form the basis for the next electric Fiat 500e. The concept Centoventi showcased a modular battery concept, allowing an extended range using dealer-installed battery packs.

In July 2019, FCA announced plans to invest €700 million in its Mirafiori plant to build a new production line devoted to its first BEV marketed in Europe, tentatively named the 500 BEV, with production to start in the second quarter of 2020. The new line was planned to have an annual production capacity of 80,000 500 BEVs. FCA invested another €50 million to build a battery production line at Mirafiori in October 2019. Camouflaged prototypes of the third-generation 500 BEV were photographed while undergoing tests in December 2019.

The public unveiling amid the COVID-19 pandemic on 4 March 2020, previously scheduled for Geneva, was led by FCA Chief Marketing Officer Olivier François, who said they held the event in Milan "to show that FCA stands close to Milan and to Italy." The 500e sits on a totally new platform and is slightly bigger than the second-generation model, which was introduced in 2007. Compared to the second-generation 500, the third-generation 500e is 60 mm (2.4 in) longer, 60 mm (2.4 in) wider, and 40 mm (1.6 in) taller, with a 20 mm (0.79 in) increase in wheelbase. The older, second-generation 500 (2007) is equipped with an internal-combustion engine or a mild hybrid drivetrain and remained in production until 2024.

A variant of the third-generation 500e, fitted with the mild hybrid drivetrain from the second-generation 500, is sold as the 500 Ibrida. It is assembled alongside the 500e at Mirafiori.

== Models ==
Initially, the 500e was available exclusively as a two-door cabriolet four-seater in the La Prima trimline, with production limited to 500 examples per country. Before any local incentives, the La Prima launch editions have a retail price of €37,900 in Italy. La Prima was available in one of three colours: Mineral Grey, Ocean Green, and Celestial Blue, designed to be reminiscent of the earth, sea, and sky, respectively; the soft top was finished with an exclusive monogram logo.

A three-door hatchback followed in June 2020, starting at £26,995, and Fiat introduced a four-doored hatchback designated 3+1 ("Trepiuno") in October of that year, with a small rear-hinged door on the passenger's side to enhance access to the rear seat, with availability limited to left-hand-drive cars. At that time in the UK, the entry-level three-door was offered as the Action model with a smaller 24 kWh battery at £22,995, the more expensive Passion and Icon models were offered at £26,495 and £27,995, respectively, and were equipped with a 42 kWh battery. The top of the line remained La Prima at £30,495.

In Autumn 2021, Fiat announced a new Product Red branded edition, fitted with the 42 kWh battery and available in hatchback and convertible styles. The Passion trim level, which included different wheel designs, a 260 mm (10.25 in) touchscreen media system, CarPlay and Android Auto, a digital radio, climate control, folding rear seats, and cruise control, was withdrawn in the UK only.

Fiat 500e (third generation)

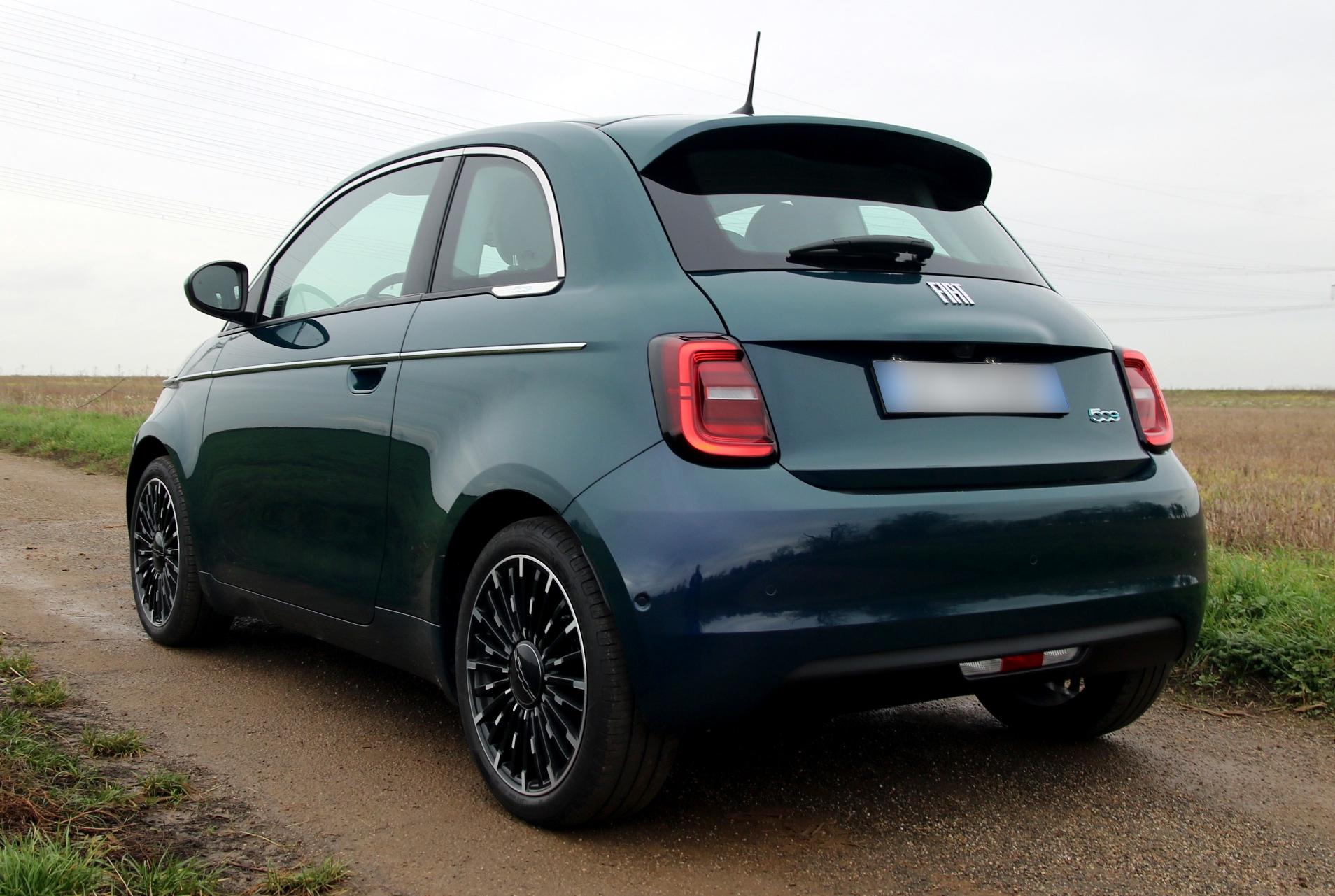
Rear view

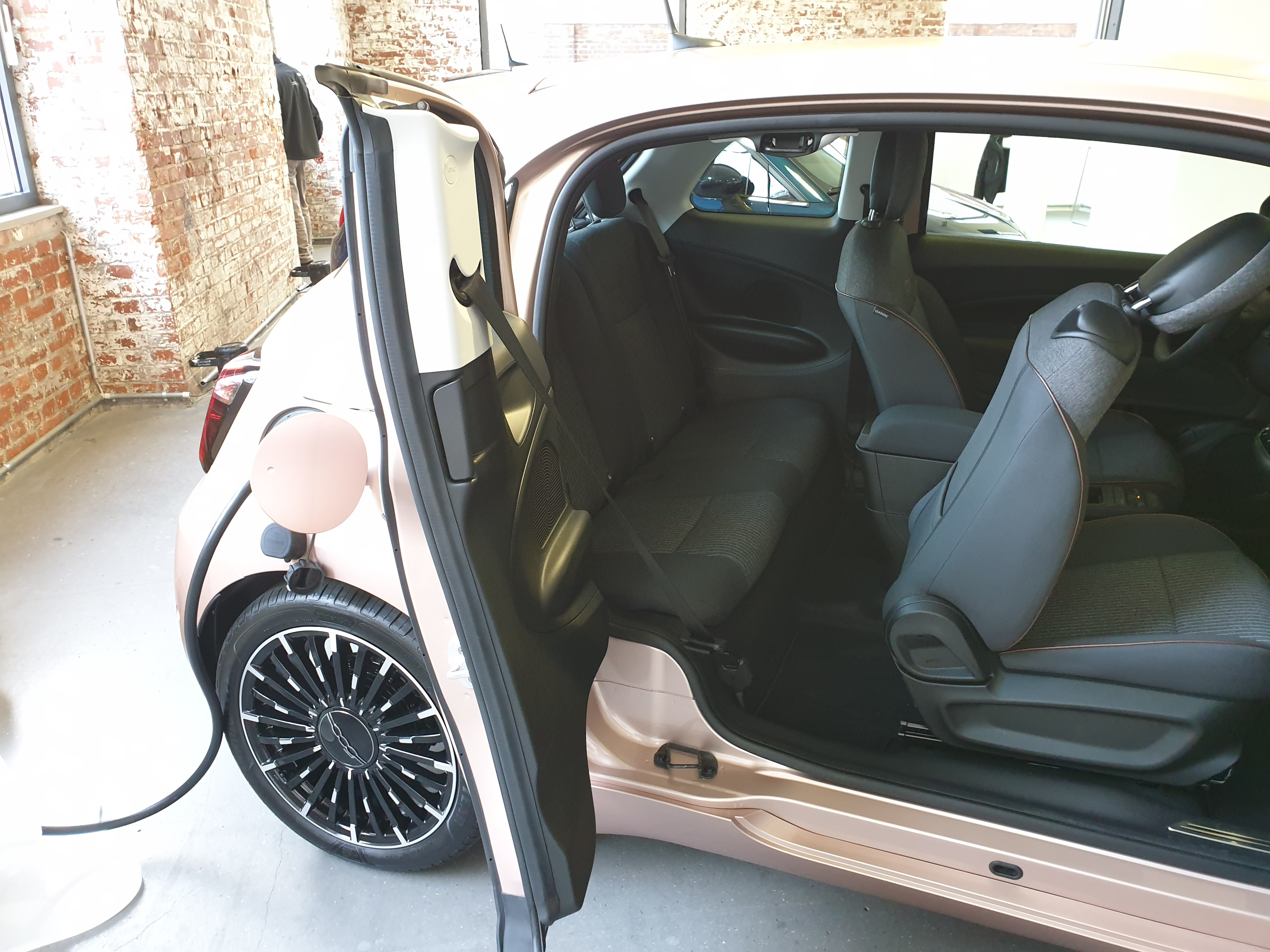
Trepiuno 4-door model (3+1)

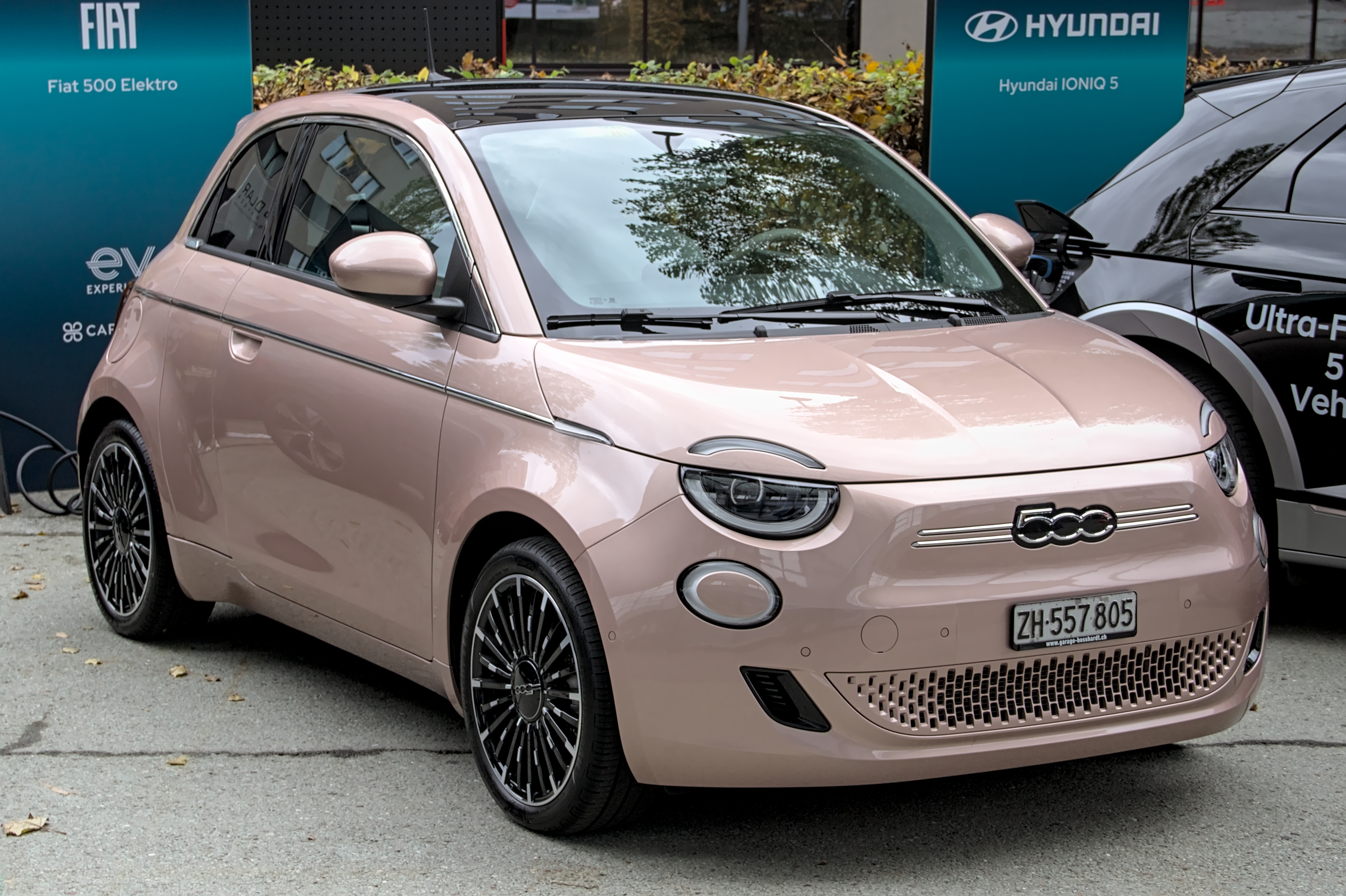
Trepiuno

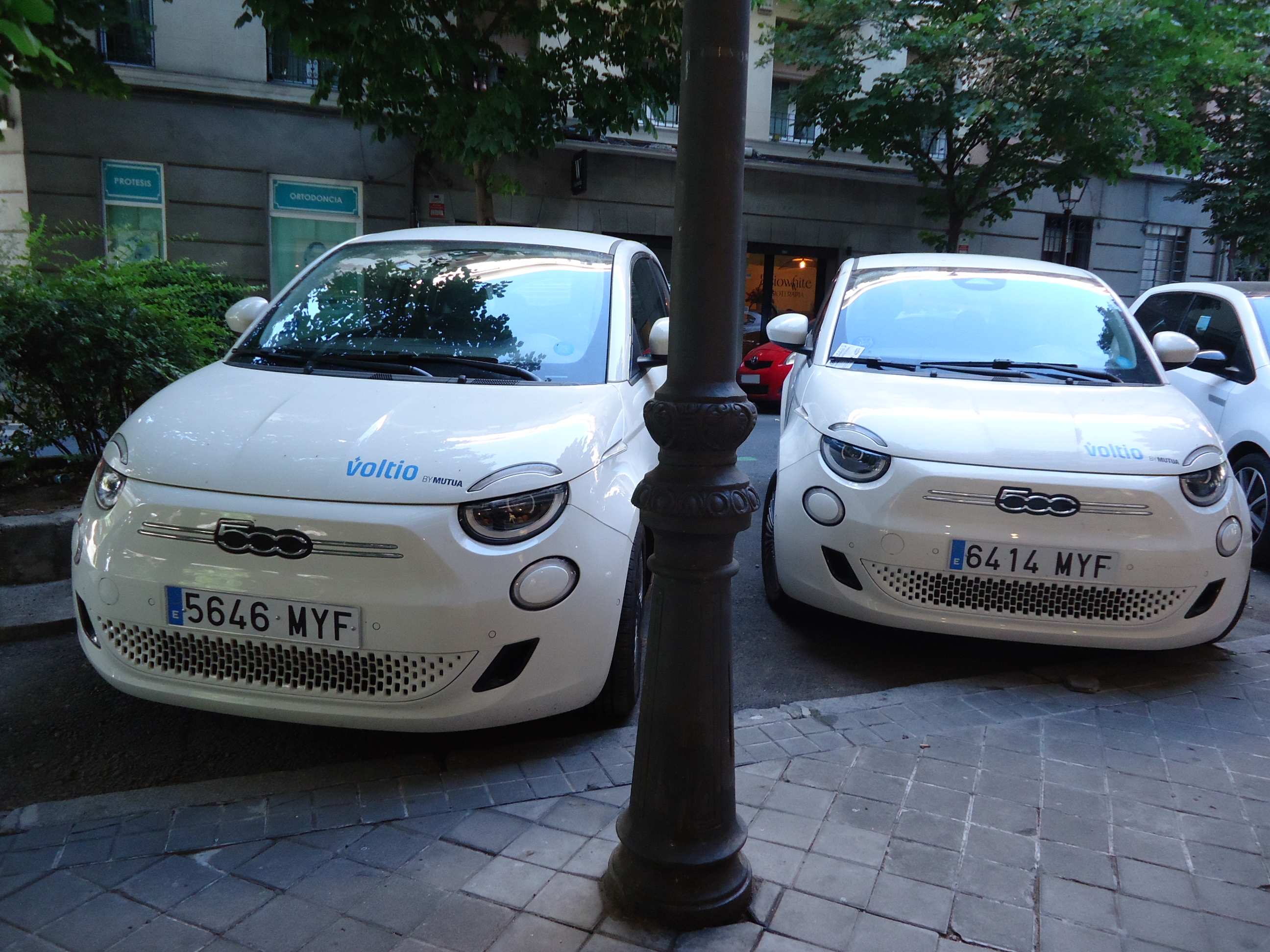
Two "La Prima"

=== Limited production ===
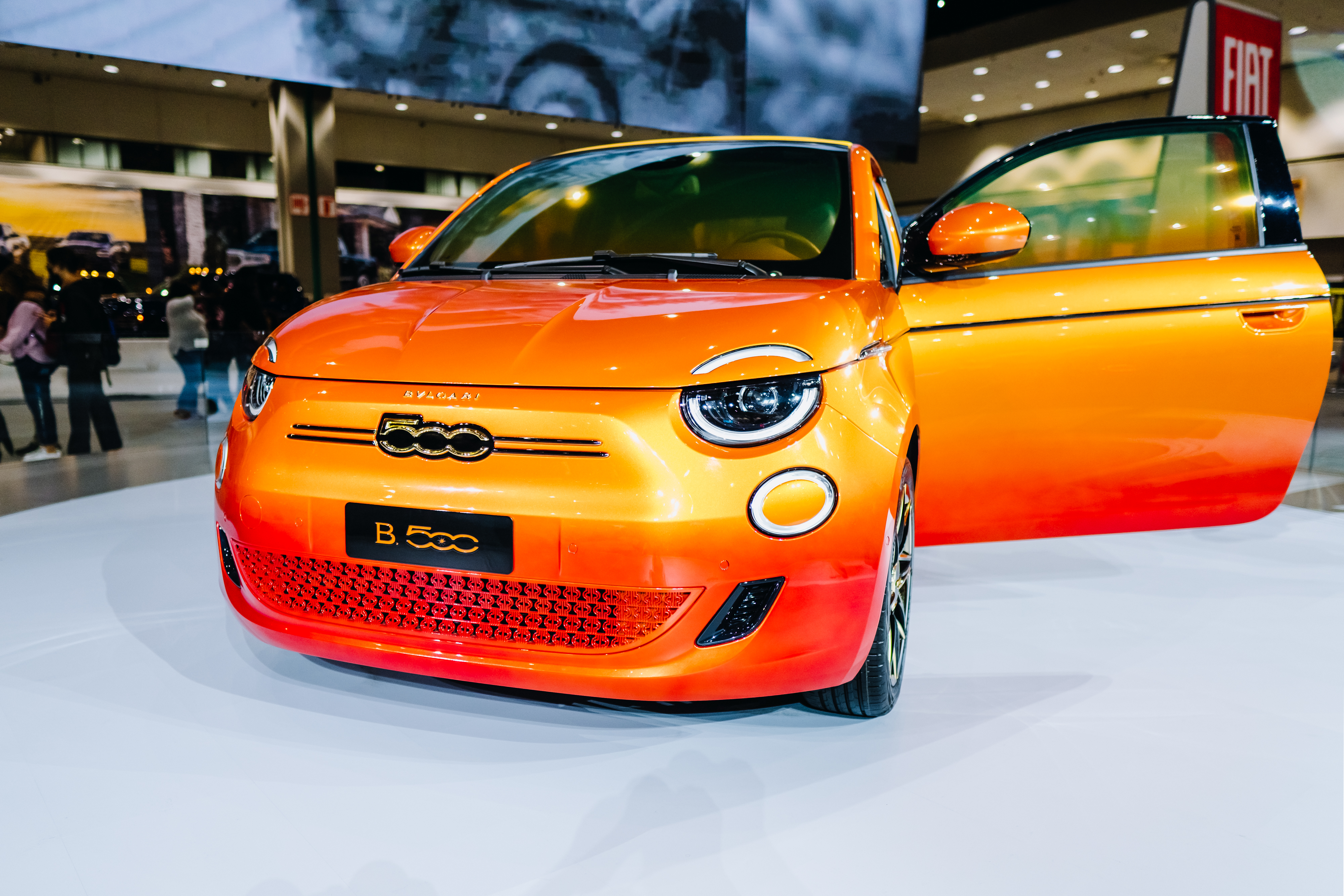
B.500 "MAI TROPPO" at the 2022 Los Angeles Auto Show

Three additional one-off models styled by well-known designers were announced with the launch of the 500e; proceeds from the auctions of the 500 Giorgio Armani, B.500 "MAI TROPPO" ("Never Too Much") by Bvlgari, and the 500 Kartell will benefit environmental organizations set up by Leonardo DiCaprio. The Kartell and Bvlgari models were created through a partnership between FCA and Altagamma. These were not the first Fiat-fashion limited editions; previously, Frida Giannini of Gucci had collaborated with Fiat Centro Stile to produce a special edition of the preceding Fiat 500 (2007 model), released in 2011.

Lasers were used to engrave the steel body panels on the Armani, which is finished in a grey-green matte silk effect that includes anti-pollution and anti-bacterial technologies. The seats are finished in a similar colour leather from certified sources. After the car was unveiled in front of Duomo Cathedral amid the COVID-19 pandemic in Italy, it was moved throughout Milan to send a message of positivity to the city and Italy. The Kartell is finished in a monochrome Kartell blue colour, extending to metal, plastic, and rubber exterior surfaces. The wheels, front grille, side mirror housings, and dashboard are covered in a plastic texture derived from the brand's Kabuki lamp, and the seats are upholstered with 100% recycled polypropylene.

An Imperial Saffron orange paint finish is applied to the exterior of the B.500 from Bvlgari, using gold dust reclaimed from the firm's manufacture of jewelry; inside, recycled silk scarves from the marque cover the dashboard and are used to trim the leather seats. The steering wheel features a removable brooch set with amethyst, topaz, and citrine stones. In addition, a special hatbox and jewelry case were made for the B.500; the gold key to the automobile, set with an ancient coin, may also be worn as jewelry.

=== Abarth 500e ===
Abarth 500e

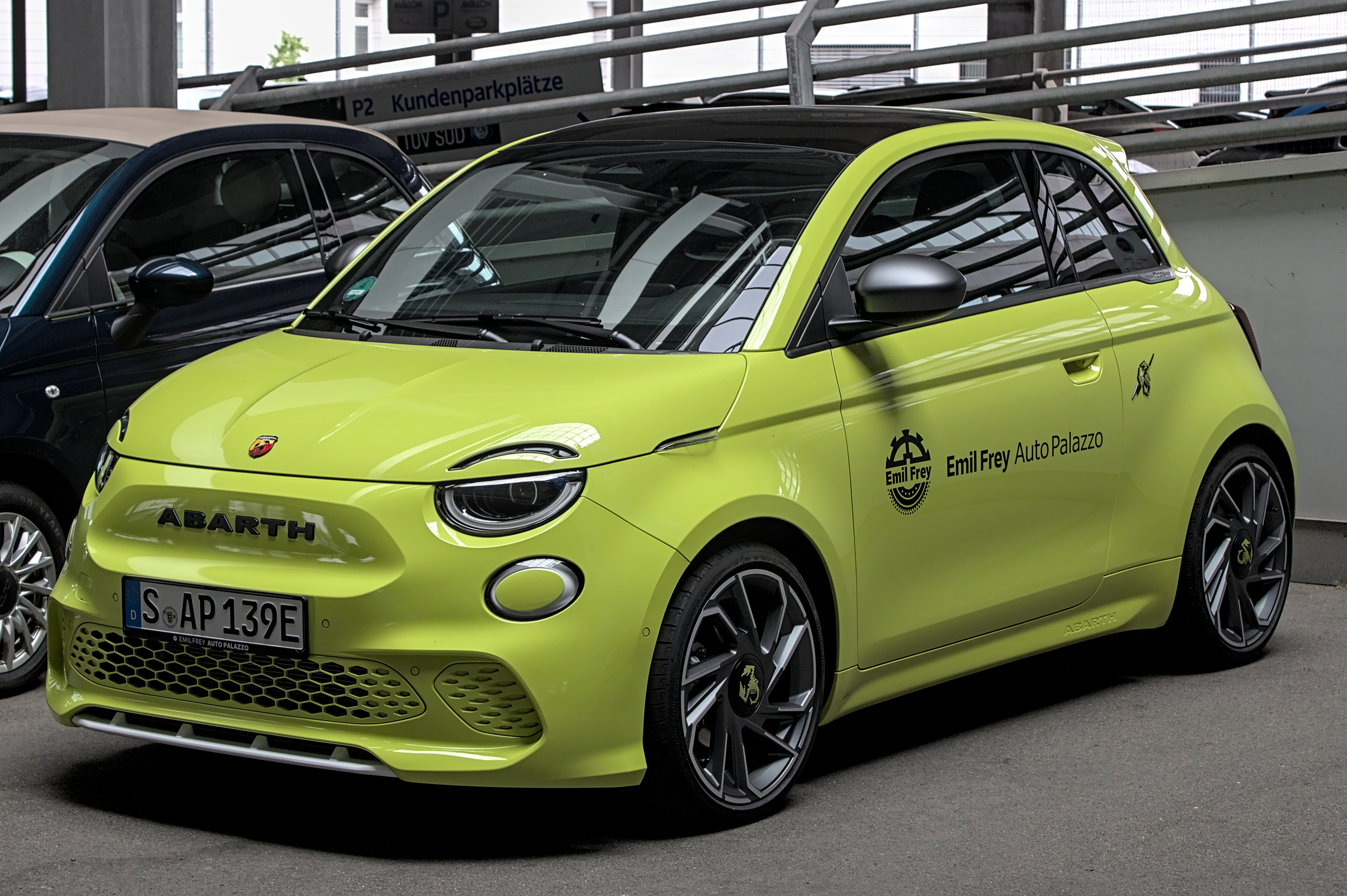
Acid Green, in Stuttgart

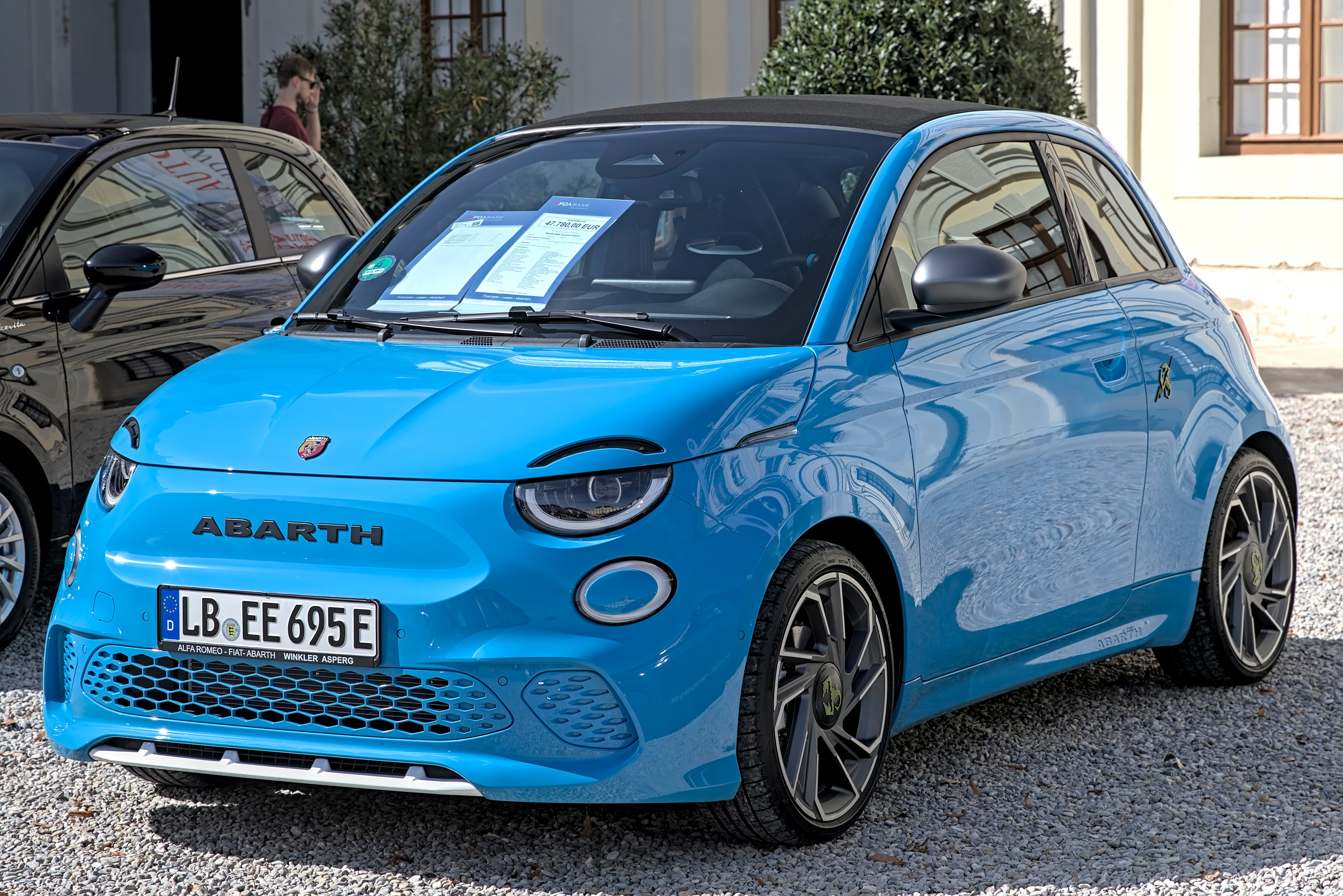
Cabrio, in Poison Blue

The Nuova Abarth 500e is a high-performance variant that was released in 2023. It made its official debut on 22 November 2022, featuring unique scorpion-badged alloy wheels. Initially, it will be released in a Scorpionissima edition limited to 1,949 examples. Scorpionissima models will be available in a choice of Acid Green or Poison Blue colours, bearing unique side graphics and wheels. The first deliveries were scheduled for June 2023.

It has a single electric traction motor which produces 113.7 kW (152.5 hp) and 235 N⋅m (173 lbf⋅ft), which are increases of 26.7 kW (35.8 hp) and 15 N⋅m (11 lbf⋅ft) compared to the standard motor; this improves the acceleration time from 0 to 100 km/h (62 mph) in 7 seconds. The enhancements in power and torque output are derived from improved inverter and battery wiring, and a reduction in the final-drive ratio. The Abarth also swaps the rear drum brakes fitted to the standard 500e for disc brakes.

Three driving modes are offered: Turismo, Scorpion Street, and Scorpion Track; output power and torque are limited to 100 kW (130 hp) and 220 N⋅m (160 lbf⋅ft) in Turismo. Scorpion Street maximizes regenerative braking, simulating the engine braking effect of a conventional car equipped with a manual transmission, while Scorpion Track sacrifices range for performance. In manufacturer testing at Balocco, the Abarth 500e is able to complete laps 1 second quicker than the Abarth 695. Total weight is 1,410 kg (3,110 lb), including the 295 kg (650 lb) battery.

Charging hardware is carried over from the regular 500e equipped with the larger battery, at rates up to 85 kW. The Abarth 500e has a battery with a capacity of 42.2 kWh (gross) and 37.3 kWh (net), giving the vehicle a claimed range of 264 km (164 mi) under the WLTP driving cycle with the standard 17-inch wheels; equipping the 18-inch wheels reduces range to 253 km (157 mi). Real-world mixed driving with 18-inch wheels indicated an actual range of 212 km (132 mi), with consumption of 3.4 mi/kWh.

=== North America ===
At the 2022 Los Angeles Auto Show held in November, Fiat showed the three special 500e-based concept models designed by Armani, Kartell, and Bvlgari. Fiat was expected to unveil the North American specification 500e at the 2023 Los Angeles Auto Show, before it went on sale in the first quarter of 2024 as a 2024 model year vehicle. However, Stellantis was absent from the 2023 LA Auto Show and the 500e debuted on the Web on 6 December.

Production of the 500e for North America began in February 2024 at Mirafiori Assembly. A Product Red version of the 2024 FIAT 500e is available to order from some dealerships in the U.S., British Columbia, and Quebec as of February 2024, available only in red (later white and black). Availability may expand to other parts of Canada later. Three other trims were released later, including "Inspired By Music" which comes exclusively in black and features a JBL Premium Audio sound system with different modes selected by Andrea Bocelli, "Inspired By Beauty" which comes exclusively in rose gold and features luxury trimming like embroidered seats, and "Inspired By Los Angeles" which comes exclusively in a blue-ish gray ("Marine Layer Mist") and combines the features of the Inspired By Music and Inspired By Beauty models.

=== Fiat 600e ===
Unveiled on 4 July 2023, the Fiat 600e is a 5-door crossover SUV with a design inspired by the 500e.

== 500 Hybrid ==
In May 2025, Fiat unveiled the 500 Hybrid, a retrofitted version of the battery-powered 500e, equipped with a 12V-mild hybrid-assisted 1.0 Firefly petrol engine and a six-speed manual transmission. Production started in November 2025.

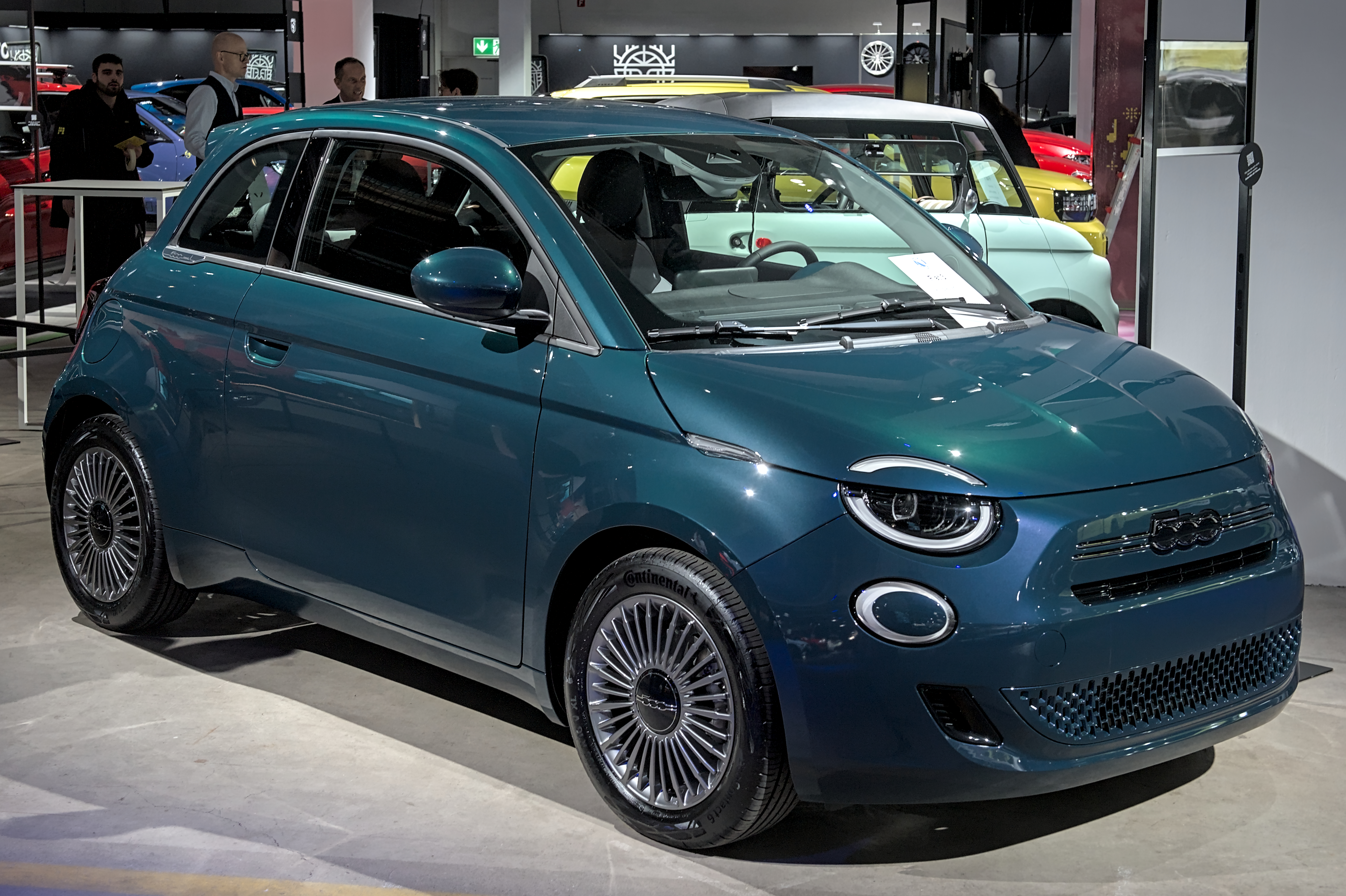
500 Hybrid

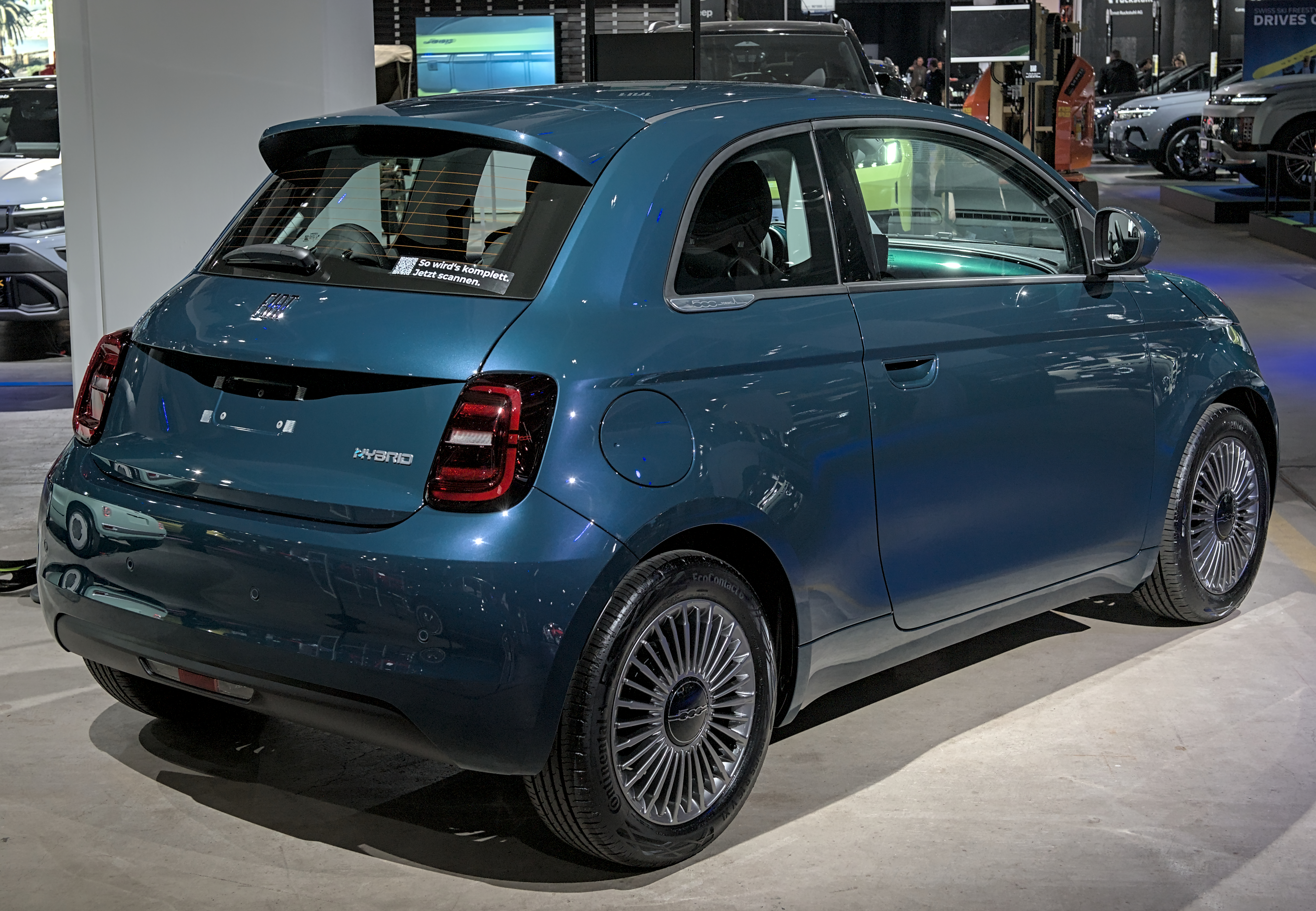
Rear view

== Sales and production ==
Production began on 18 February 2020, shortly after FCA completed the new production line at Mirafiori Assembly. Production was paused starting on 13 March 2020 during the nationwide lockdown in Italy due to the spread of SARS-CoV-2 infections. By August 2022, it was the best-selling electric car in Italy. However, sales of the 500e have been poor in recent years in Europe and particularly the United States, where less than 500 units were sold in 2024, the year the 500e was reintroduced. Poor sales have led to Stellantis pausing production in its Mirafiori plant in Turin.

The 500e competes with electric city cars like the BMW i3, Honda e, Mini Electric (marketed as the Mini Cooper SE in all markets outside the UK), Peugeot e-208, Renault Twingo Electric, Renault Zoe, Smart Forfour, and the Volkswagen Group New Small Family platforms (SEAT Mii / Škoda Citigo / Volkswagen e-Up). Initially, sales were limited to Europe only starting from 2020; other markets, such as Brazil and Israel, followed starting in 2021. Exports to the U.S. could follow if there is sufficient demand. The 500e is expected to go on sale in North America by the first quarter of 2024.

== Equipment ==
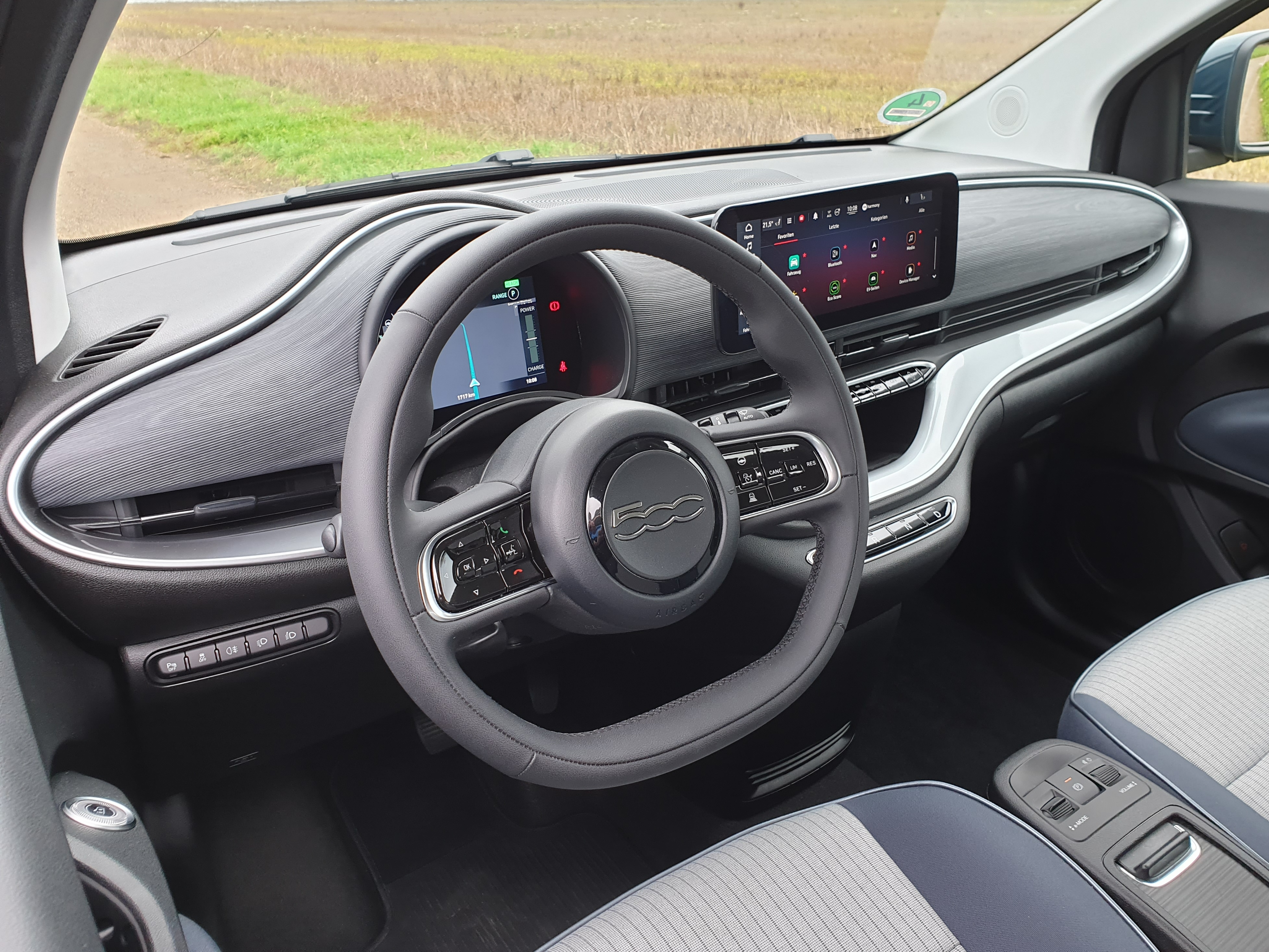
Interior of the 500e showing the car's dashboard and the UConnect 5 infotainment system

The 500e is the first city car with level 2 autonomous driving, and the first FCA car equipped with the new UConnect 5 infotainment system. The advanced driver assistance systems systems include Autonomous Emergency Brake with pedestrian and cyclist detection; Intelligent Speed Assistant; Lane Control; Intelligent Adaptive Cruise Control (iACC) and Lane Centering; and Emergency Call.

The Android-based UConnect 5 infotainment system is displayed on a 260 mm (10.25 in) touchscreen. It has Android Auto and wireless Apple CarPlay connectivity, automatic call to the emergency services, and can also be used to monitor the car or control certain functions remotely using a smartphone app.

Under European Union law, all EVs must produce some form of noise at low speeds to make pedestrians aware of their presence. Most cars use a spaceship-like tone; the 500e will instead play the score from Amarcord, composed by Nino Rota, when cruising below 20 km/h (12 mph). According to Fiat, alternative sounds will be downloadable in the future.

== Performance ==
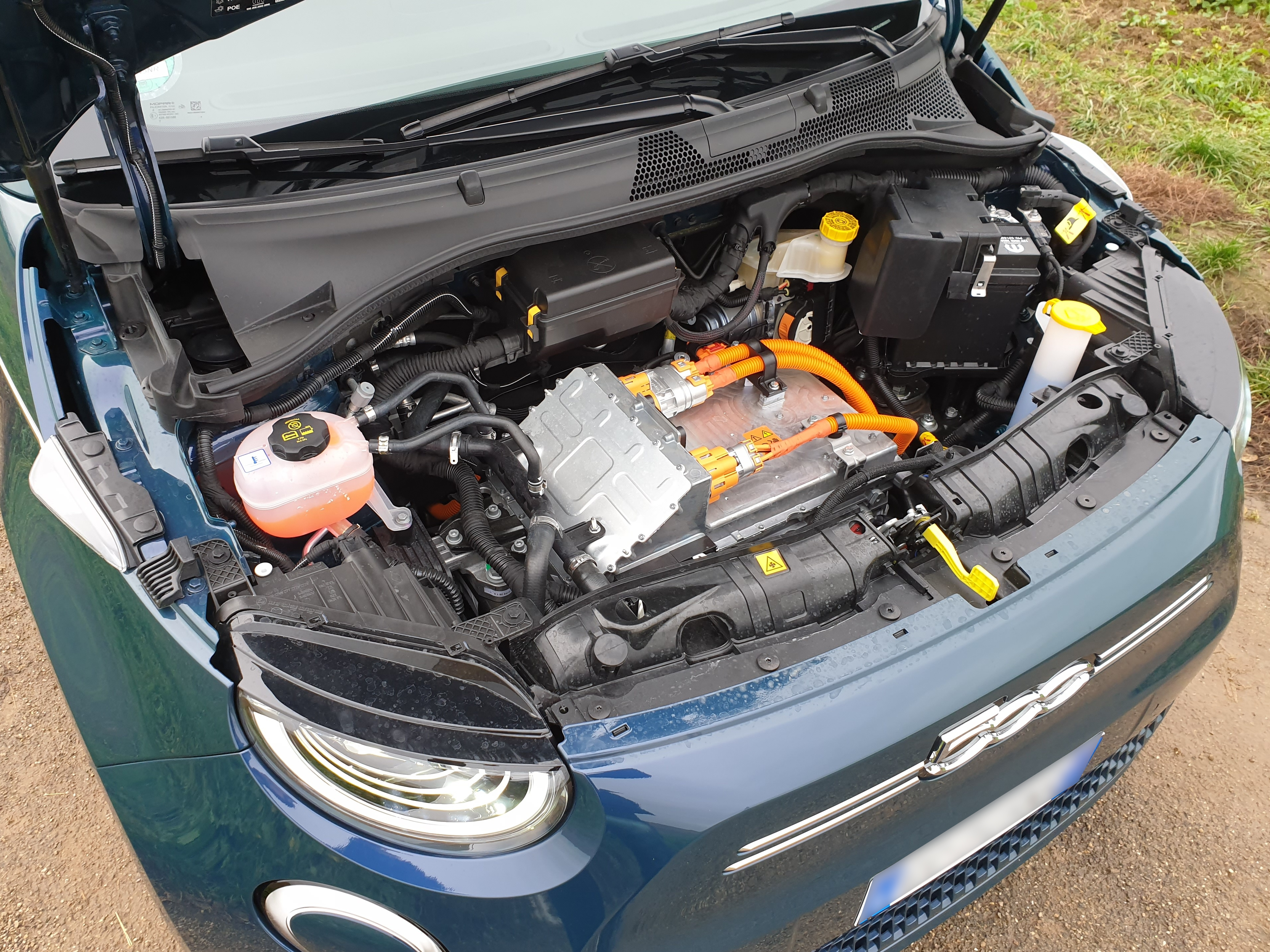
The car's underhood equipment

The 500e is offered with a choice of two motor and battery combinations. One is fitted to the entry level Action trim in the UK, equipped with a 70 kW (94 bhp) motor and a 24 kWh battery (21.2 kWh usable) that charges at up to 50 kW. The second are equipped in the higher level Passion, Icon, Red, and La Prima trims, with a 87 kW (117 hp) motor, 42 kWh battery (37.3 kWh usable), and 85 kW charger. With the larger battery and more powerful motor, the car is limited to 150 km/h (93 mph); these models can accelerate from 0–50 km/h (31 mph) in 3.1 seconds and 0–100 km/h (62 mph) in 9.0 s. The smaller battery reduces power and also weight, by 100 kg (220 lb), resulting in an acceleration of 0–100 km/h (62 mph) in 9.5 s. Both battery models can accelerate to 0–50 km/h (31 mph) in 3.1 seconds; the top speed is limited to 135 km/h (84 mph). Energy consumption under the WLTP cycle is 14.3 kWh/100 km (146 mpg‑e) for the 500e (42 kWh) and 18.1 kWh/100 km (116 mpg‑e) for the Abarth.

For North America, the 500e is offered with the 87 kW (117 hp) traction motor and 42 kWh battery, giving it an estimated range of 149 mi (240 km) and consumption of 116 mpg‑e (18.1 kWh/100 km) under the EPA combined driving cycle. Observed consumption was markedly better than the estimate, at 12.4 kWh/100 km (169 mpg‑e) during testing by Ars Technica, using Range mode.

Third generation 500e powertrains and performance
| Model | Battery | | Output | | Acceleration (sec) | | Top speed | Range (City+Hwy) | | Consumption (City+Hwy) | | Max. charging (kW) |
| Model | Gross (kWh) | Net (kWh) | Power | Torque | 0-50 km/h (31 mph) | 0–100 km/h (62 mph) | Top speed | WLTP | EPA | WLTP | EPA | Max. charging (kW) |
|---|---|---|---|---|---|---|---|---|---|---|---|---|
| 500e (base) | 24 | 21.2 | 70 kW (94 hp; 95 PS) | 220 N⋅m (160 lbf⋅ft) | 3.1 | 9.5 | 135 km/h (84 mph) | 185 km (115 mi) | —N/a | 13.0 kWh/100 km (161 mpg‑e) | —N/a | 50 (DC); 11 (AC) |
| 500e | 42 | 37.3 | 87 kW (117 hp; 118 PS) | 220 N⋅m (160 lbf⋅ft) | 3.1 | 9.0 | 150 km/h (93 mph) | 311 km (193 mi) | 149 mi (240 km) | 14.3 kWh/100 km (146 mpg‑e) | 116 mpg‑e (18.1 kWh/100 km) | 85 (DC); 11 (AC) |
| Abarth 500e | 42 | 37.3 | 113.7 kW (152.5 hp; 154.6 PS) | 235 N⋅m (173 lbf⋅ft) | ? | 7.0 | 155 km/h (96 mph) | 253 km (157 mi) | —N/a | 18.1 kWh/100 km (116 mpg‑e) | —N/a | 85 (DC); 11 (AC) |

The 500e has three driving modes branded Normal, Range, and Sherpa. Fiat's press release describes the features of Sherpa mode as: "Just like a Himalayan Sherpa, who is in charge of the whole expedition and guides it to the destination, this driving mode adjusts various parameters: maximum speed, limited to 80 km/h (50 mph); accelerator response, in order to reduce energy consumption; and deactivation of the climate control system and heated seats." Range mode enables one-pedal driving, with strong regenerative braking as the throttle pedal is lifted.

=== Charging ===
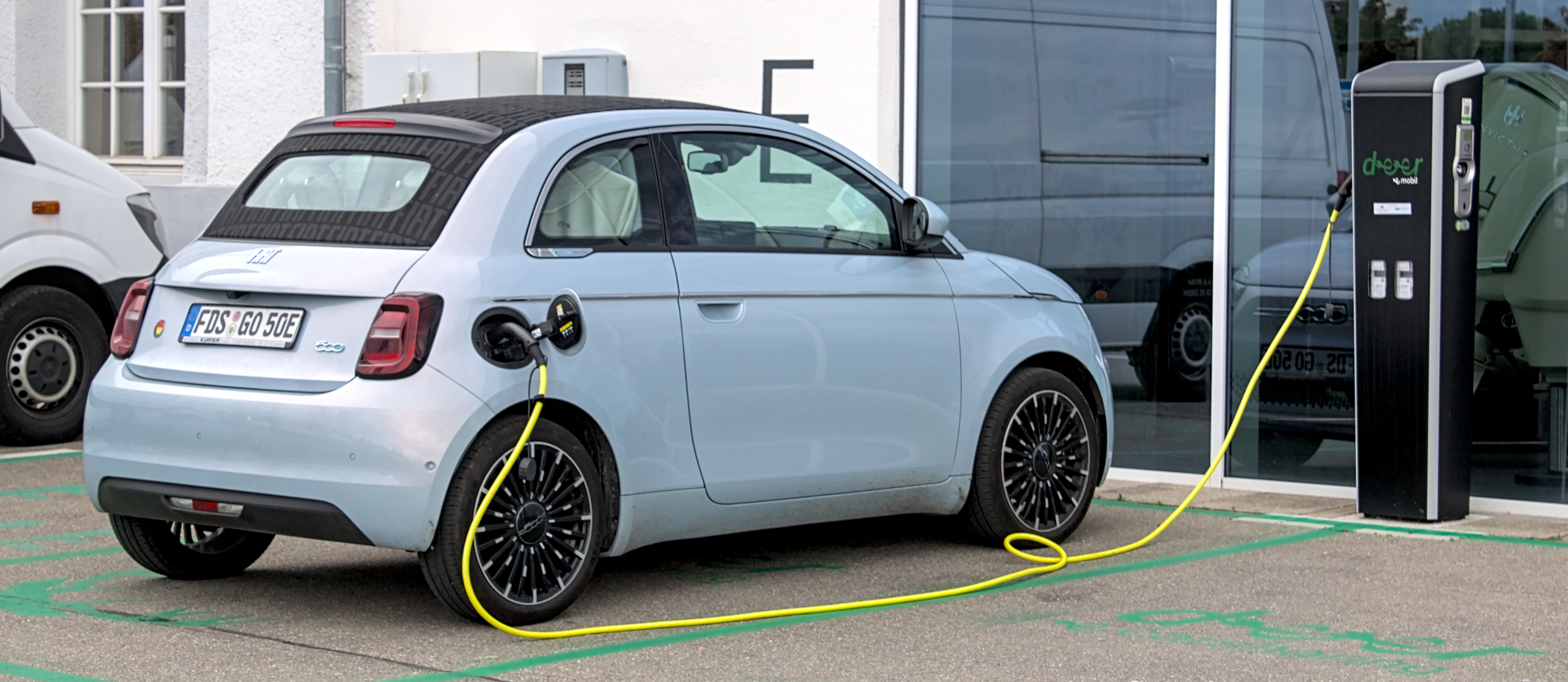
La Prima car model at a charging station in Böblingen

The 500e models with a 42 kWh battery can accommodate DC fast charging at up to 85 kW, while the base model with the smaller 24 kWh battery is limited to 50 kW; all have an on-board AC charger that accommodates up to 11 kW. At 85 kW, it takes 5 minutes to add enough charge to travel 50 kilometres (31 mi). The fast charger can charge the 42 kWh battery from 0 to 80% in just 35 minutes at 85 kW, or from 10 to 80% in 30 minutes for the smaller 24 kWh battery. A CCS Combo Type 2 inlet located on the rear right fender of the car accommodates both AC and DC charging; for North America, a CCS Combo Type 1 connector is fitted instead.

The Launch Edition also includes the easyWallbox, a home charging station developed by Engie for FCA that can be connected to a normal home outlet to supply power at 2.3 kW; the easyWallbox can be upgraded to supply up to 7.4 kW.

== Safety ==
ANCAP test results Fiat 500e (2021, aligned with Euro NCAP)
| Test | Points | % |
|---|---|---|
| Overall: | 5 /5 stars | |
| Adult occupant: | 29.66 | 78% |
| Child occupant: | 38.76 | 79% |
| Pedestrian: | 34.45 | 67% |
| Safety assist: | 10.83 | 67% |

Euro NCAP test results Fiat 500e 'ICON' (LHD) (2021)
| Test | Points | % |
|---|---|---|
| Overall: | 4 /5 stars | |
| Adult occupant: | 28.9 | 76% |
| Child occupant: | 39.5 | 80% |
| Pedestrian: | 36.4 | 67% |
| Safety assist: | 10.8 | 67% |

== Awards and recognition ==
The Fiat 500e has received several awards in international markets. In 2021, it was named Best Electric Small Car in the Best Car Awards organized by the Belgian automotive magazines Le Moniteur Automobile and AutoGids."Best Car Awards 2021: Electric Small". Le Moniteur Automobile (in French).
