= Arianna (singer) =

Italian singer and stage actress (born 1975)

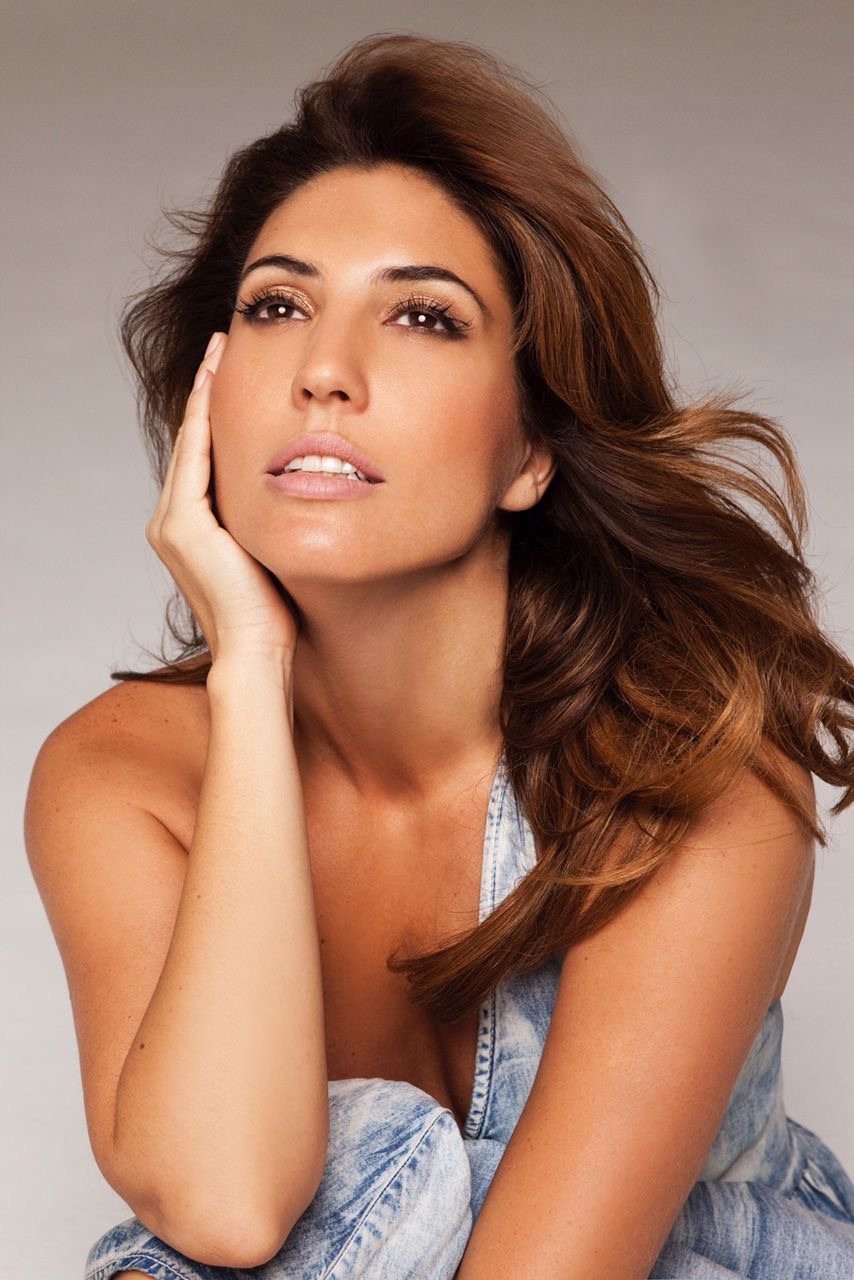
- Arianna in 2024

Background information
- Born: Arianna Martina Bergamaschi; November 11, 1975 (age 50); Milan, Italy
- Genres: Pop; children's music; musical theatre
- Occupations: Singer; songwriter; stage actress; television presenter
- Years active: 1989–present
- Labels: Walt Disney Records; RTI Music; Edel Music
- Spouse: Olivier François

Arianna Martina Bergamaschi (born November 11, 1975), known professionally as Arianna, is an Italian singer, songwriter, stage actress and television presenter. She began her professional recording career in 1990 as the singer and promotional representative of The Walt Disney Company in Italy. In 1999 she placed fourth in the Newcomers section of the Sanremo Music Festival 1999 with "C'è che ti amo".

Alongside her recording work, Arianna has played leading roles in musical theatre, including Pinocchio, Beauty and the Beast and Murder Ballad. Her international work includes recordings and performances with Ennio Morricone, Il Volo, Pitbull, Shaggy, Flo Rida, will.i.am, Michael Bolton, Anthony Ramos and Giorgio Moroder.

In 2024 she co-wrote and performed "Be Human", the anthem of the second World Meeting on Human Fraternity in Vatican City. In 2025 she performed the song again at the internationally streamed Grace for the World concert in St. Peter's Square and launched the North American stage production Italiani Veri – The Show.

== Early life and career ==
Arianna was born in Milan and is the daughter of singer-songwriter Graziella Caly. As a child, she appeared in advertising campaigns and toured with her mother. She later appeared in the variety programmes Fantastico 2 and Fantastico 3 and in the 1989 RAI miniseries I promessi sposi. She studied dance with Brian Bullard and Garrison Rochelle.

In 1990, Arianna was selected as Disney's singer and promotional representative in Italy. Her launch was connected to the Italian version of "Part of Your World" from The Little Mermaid. She released four albums for Walt Disney Records, appeared on several compilations and wrote the column Il filo di Arianna for the Italian weekly Topolino.

During the first half of the 1990s, she presented television and radio programmes for young audiences and was a RAI correspondent for the opening of Euro Disneyland.

After studying acting, Arianna starred opposite Maurizio Micheli in the musical comedy Un mandarino per Teo, which also played Rome's Teatro Sistina. She placed third at Sanremo Giovani in 1998 and fourth in the Newcomers section of the 1999 Sanremo Music Festival, after which she released the album Arianna through RTI Music.

== 2000–2012: Theatre and international performances ==
In 2000, Arianna performed the opening and closing themes for the second season of the RAI series Una donna per amico and appeared as Azzurra in the episode "Lontani". On October 14, she performed "O Santissima" with her mother during the Jubilee of Families in St. Peter's Square, accompanied by the choir and orchestra of the Diocese of Rome under Marco Frisina.

During the 2000s she took leading roles in musical theatre, including the Blue Fairy in Pinocchio, Juliet in Romeo and Juliet and Bernardina in Masaniello. In 2007, she released A modo mio, a self-produced album of songs from international musicals adapted into Italian. In 2008, she recorded "Verso est", composed by Ennio Morricone for a Lancia Delta campaign starring Richard Gere.

After television roles in Saturday Night Live from Milano and CentoVetrine, Arianna played Belle in Stage Entertainment's Italian production of Beauty and the Beast in Milan and Rome from 2009 to 2011.

In 2010 and 2011, Arianna used the pen name Oliriana to write Italian lyrics for theme songs and soundtracks of animated series distributed by RTI Music, including Kilari, MÄR, Kikoriki, Care Bears: Adventures in Care-a-lot, Pearlie, Mila e Shiro: il sogno continua and My Little Pony: Friendship Is Magic. In 2011, she performed "Crederò" with Amedeo Minghi for the soundtrack album Il fantastico mondo di Fantaghirò.

In 2012, Arianna appeared as a special guest on selected North American dates of Il Volo's Il Volo Takes Flight Tour, including performances in Toronto, New York, Miami and Los Angeles. She also appeared in the film 100 metri dal paradiso and performed its end-title song "Sopra il filo", for which she co-wrote the lyrics.

== International career (2013–present) ==
In 2013, Arianna released "Sexy People (The Fiat Song)" with Pitbull. The song, which incorporates music from "Torna a Surriento", reached number 97 on the Billboard Hot 100 and number five on the US Dance Club Songs chart. In 2014, she participated in UNICEF's global #Imagine project, produced by David Guetta with the support of Yoko Ono.

In 2015, she released "Adesso o mai" and its English version "If U Slip, U Slide" with Shaggy. In March 2016, she performed with Michael Bolton at a fundraiser for Hillary Clinton's presidential campaign, and later released "Who Did You Love" with Flo Rida. In September, she made her US stage debut as Sara in Murder Ballad at the Detroit Public Theatre. The following month, she performed at the Columbus Citizens Foundation's annual gala in New York.

In 2017, she recorded the Italian-language version of will.i.am's "Mona Lisa Smile" and appeared in its music video. She subsequently released "All for You" in 2018 and reunited with Shaggy for "Bella Vita" in 2019; the latter was used in an advertising campaign for the Italian telecommunications company 3. From 2019 to 2020 she returned to the role of Sara in the Italian production Murder Ballad – Omicidio in rock and co-adapted the songs into Italian.

In 2021, Arianna released "Beautiful Angel", an English-language pop adaptation of Carlos Gardel's "Por una Cabeza", and sang "The Prayer" at the televised Vatican Christmas Concert.

In September 2022, she performed in Pisa at Omaggio a Ennio Morricone with the All-Stars Orchestra. On October 9, she reunited with Il Volo as a special guest at the FLA Live Arena in Sunrise, Florida, performing "Smile" with the trio. The Live Nation concert was streamed internationally through StageIt to raise funds for Red Cross relief following Hurricane Ian. That year she also appeared in Andrea Zuliani's film Le ragazze non piangono.

In 2023, she released the environmental charity single "Terra Madre" and "Vita mia", featuring Alfa and produced by Ryan Tedder.

On May 11, 2024, Arianna participated in the closing event of the second World Meeting on Human Fraternity. She co-wrote its official anthem, "Be Human", with American actor and singer Anthony Ramos, William Wells and Flavio Ibba, and performed it with the Amazing Grace Gospel Choir. She performed it again on September 13, 2025, during Grace for the World, the closing concert of the third World Meeting on Human Fraternity. The event featured artists including Andrea Bocelli, Pharrell Williams, John Legend, Karol G, Jennifer Hudson, Teddy Swims and Il Volo and was broadcast internationally on Disney+, Hulu and ABC News Live.

On October 2, 2025, Arianna premiered Italiani Veri – The Show in the Toronto area. Written with Maurizio Monti and directed by Chiara Vecchi, the English-language one-woman musical combined songs, storytelling, comedy and filmed material about Italian culture and Italian–North American cultural differences. The production subsequently played Los Angeles, Chicago and Miami in 2025, followed by Boston, New York, Atlanta and San Francisco in May 2026.

In November 2025, Arianna premiered "The Guardian", a song composed by Giorgio Moroder for UNICEF's Oops – A Light and Music Show in Brixen, Italy. The following month, she joined Moroder at Villa Zegna during Art Basel Miami Beach to perform a new version of Donna Summer's "I Feel Love" while he reconstructed the song's production live. The performance was also issued as a limited-edition vinyl recording. In May 2026, she collaborated with RRP on the three-track single That's amore, including a version used in a Fiat television campaign.

== Personal life ==
Arianna married French businessman Olivier François in 2014.

== Discography ==
=== Studio albums ===
- Siamo forti (1990)
- T... come teenagers (come io come te) (1991)
- Bella non lo sa (1993)
- Arianna canta Disney (1994)
- Arianna (1999)
- A modo mio (2007)

=== Cast recordings ===
- Pinocchio – Il grande musical (2003)

=== Singles ===
- "La Sirenetta/Ariel" (1990)
- "Siamo forti/Sogni" (1990)
- "C'è che ti amo" (1999)
- "I Will Find You There" (2004)
- "Fermami" (2005)
- "La verità (è che ti tradirò)" (2005)
- "Diva" (2007)
- "Sexy People (The Fiat Song)" featuring Pitbull (2013)
- "Adesso o mai" featuring Shaggy (2015)
- "If U Slip, U Slide" featuring Shaggy (2015)
- "Who Did You Love" featuring Flo Rida (2016)
- "Mona Lisa Smile" featuring will.i.am (2017)
- "All for You" (2018)
- "Bella Vita" featuring Shaggy (2019)
- "Beautiful Angel" (2021)
- "Terra Madre" (2023)
- "Vita mia" featuring Alfa (2023)
- "Nel posto giusto" (2024)
- "Tutto troppo tanto" (2025)
- "Tutto troppo tanto (Claudio Guerrini Remix)" (2025)
- "That's amore" with RRP (2026)

=== Soundtrack appearances ===
- "Love for Real", from Il ritmo della vita (2009)
- "Crederò" with Amedeo Minghi, from Il fantastico mondo di Fantaghirò (2011)
- "Sopra il filo", end-title song from 100 metri dal paradiso (2012)

== Songs written as Oliriana ==
Arianna wrote the Italian lyrics to the following RTI Music releases under the pen name Oliriana.

Title	Music	Performer	Release	Year
"La speranza del cuore"	Alessandro Boriani	Denise Misseri	Kilari	2010
"MÄR"	Enrico Francesco Santulli	Giacinto Livia	Natale con Cristina	2010
"Kikoriki"	Danilo Bernardi, Giuseppe Zanca	Matteo e Francesco	Natale con Cristina	2010
"Le avventure degli orsetti"	Fulvio Griffini, Stefania Camera	Benedetta Caretta	Natale con Cristina	2010
"Pearlie"	Leonardo Ceglie, Giovanni Rosina	Benedetta Caretta	Natale con Cristina	2010
"Mila e Shiro: il sogno continua"	Cristiano Macrì	Cristina D'Avena	Le sigle originali dei cartoni di Italia 1	2011
"My Little Pony: l'amicizia è magica"	Maurizio Bianchini, Graziano Pegoraro, Susanna Balbarani, Antonio D'Ambrosio	Susanna Balbarani	Le sigle originali dei cartoni di Italia 1	2011

== Theatrical performances ==
- Un mandarino per Teo 1998/1999 e 1999/2000, main female character, musical comedy by Pietro Garinei and Sandro Giovannini with Maurizio Micheli, direction by Gino Landi
- Un viaggio d'amore (2000 e 2003), main female character with Michele Placido
- Il mago di Oz 2000/2001, as Dorothy, directed by F. Crivelli
- Sogno di una notte di mezza estate (2001, 2002 e 2003), co-starring role as Ermia, direction by Tato Russo
- La bisbetica domata (2002) Summer Tour, as Bianca, direction by Alessandro Capone
- Pinocchio (2003 e 2004), as The Blue Fairy, direction by Saverio Marconi with music and lyrics by Pooh.
- Romeo e Giulietta (2006), as Juliet, direction by M. Panici
- Masaniello (2006, 2007, 2008, 2009), main female character as Bernardina, direction by Tato Russo
- La Bella e la Bestia 2009/2010 and 2010/2011, as Belle, direction by Glenn Casale
- Tre cuori in affitto (2011/2012) with Paolo Ruffini, starring as Janet. Direction by Claudio Insegno
- Aggiungi un posto a tavola (2013/2014) by Garinei and Giovannini in the role of Clementina. Direction by Fabrizio Angelini
- Best of Musical (2014/2015) gala concert with the most important songs from the Stage Entertainment musicals productions. Direction by Chiara Noschese
- Murder Ballad (2016) United States Musical theatre debut at the Detroit PublicTheatre in the main character of Sara. Direction by Courtney Burkett.§
- Un americano a Parigi (2017) – Fanny; directed by Enzo Sanny
- Murder Ballad – Omicidio in rock (2019–20) – Sara and co-adaptor; directed by Ario Avecone and Fabrizio Checcacci
- Toc Toc (2019) – with Sandra Milo; directed by Claudio Insegno
- Vlad Dracula (2023–24) – Mina; directed by Ario Avecone
- Italiani Veri – The Show (2025–26) – creator and performer; written with Maurizio Monti

== Filmography ==
=== Film ===
- 100 metri dal paradiso (2012) – Stella
- Le ragazze non piangono (2022)

=== Television acting ===
- I promessi sposi (1989), miniseries
- Una donna per amico (2000), episode "Lontani" – Azzurra
- Camera Café (2007), episode "I lucchetti dell'amore"
- Butta la luna 2 (2009), episodes 5–6
- CentoVetrine (2009) – Roberta Di Leo
- Non smettere di sognare (2011) – Arianna, vocal coach
- Rex (2013) – Bianca

== Television ==
- Fantastico 2 and Fantastico 3 (Rai 1, 1981–82) – performer
- Cinema insieme (Rai 1, 1991) – presenter
- Eurodisney '92 (Rai 1, 1992) – correspondent
- Canta con noi (Junior TV, 1995) – presenter
- La Corrida (Canale 5, 2007) – showgirl
- Saturday Night Live from Milano (Italia 1, 2008–09) – cast member
- Baila! (Canale 5, 2011) – judge
- Bau Boys (Italia 1, 2012) – co-presenter
- Colorado – 'Sto classico (Italia 1, 2012), "L'Odissea" – Siren
- Io canto (Canale 5, 2013) – judge
- Paparazzi (Rai_Italia, 2024- present) - Arianna's Corner

== Radio ==
- Siamo forti (Rete 105, 1991) – presenter

== Awards and honours ==
- 2014 – Vindobona Award for career achievement
