= Fiat Centoventi =

Electric concept car

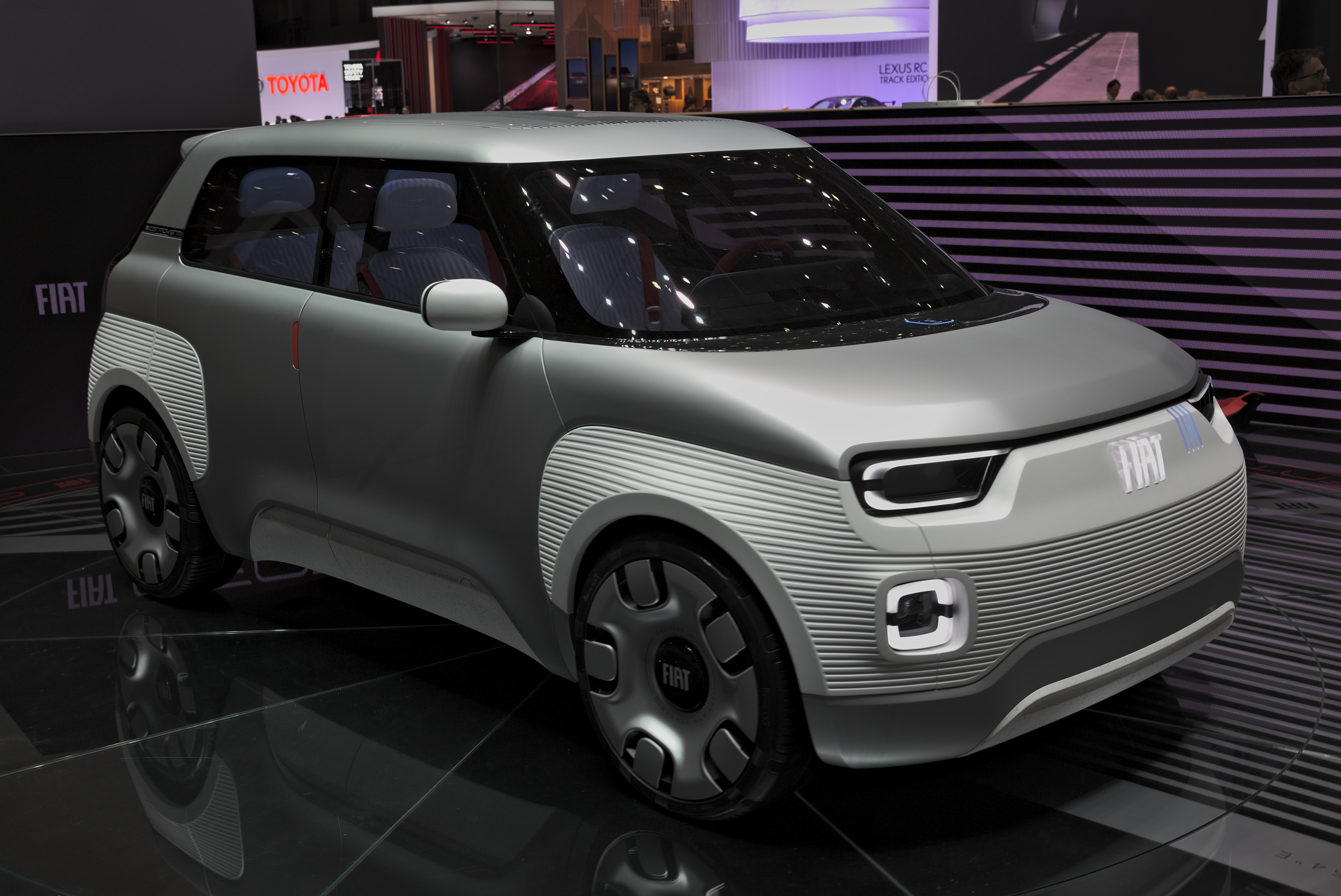

Overview
- Manufacturer: FCA Italy
- Production: 2019

Body and chassis
- Class: Electric Concept car (A)
- Body style: 5-door hatchback
- Layout: Front-engine, front-wheel-drive
- Doors: Suicide

Powertrain
- Electric range: 100–500 km (62–311 mi)

Dimensions
- Wheelbase: 2.420 m (95.3 in)
- Length: 3.680 m (144.9 in)
- Width: 1.740 m (68.5 in)
- Height: 1.527 m (60.1 in)

The Fiat Centoventi EV is an electric concept car from the Italian car manufacturer Fiat, unveiled in March 2019 at the Geneva Motor Show. The name Centoventi is in recognition of the company's 120th anniversary. It previews the design of the next Fiat Panda.

The Centoventi is designed to be customisable and upgradeable with a selection of battery packs, with a standard base model of one battery providing 100 kilometres (62 mi) of range. Owners can buy or rent up to three extra underfloor batteries, plus an additional one that slides under the driver's seat, to extend the range to up to a maximum of 500 kilometres (311 mi). The underfloor batteries can be added by a garage in under five minutes. The charging port is positioned in front of the windscreen and incorporates a cable reel for the cable.

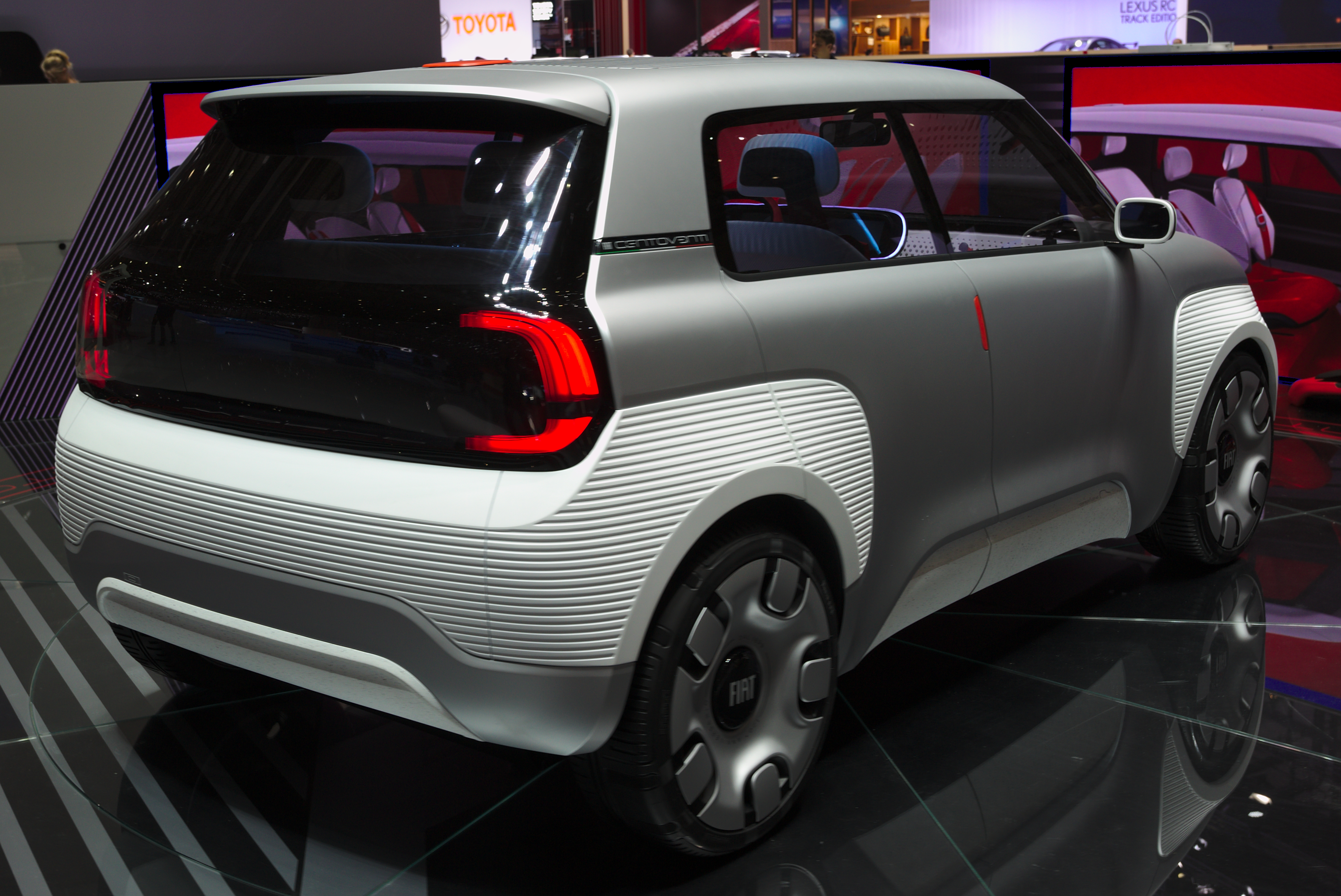
Rear view

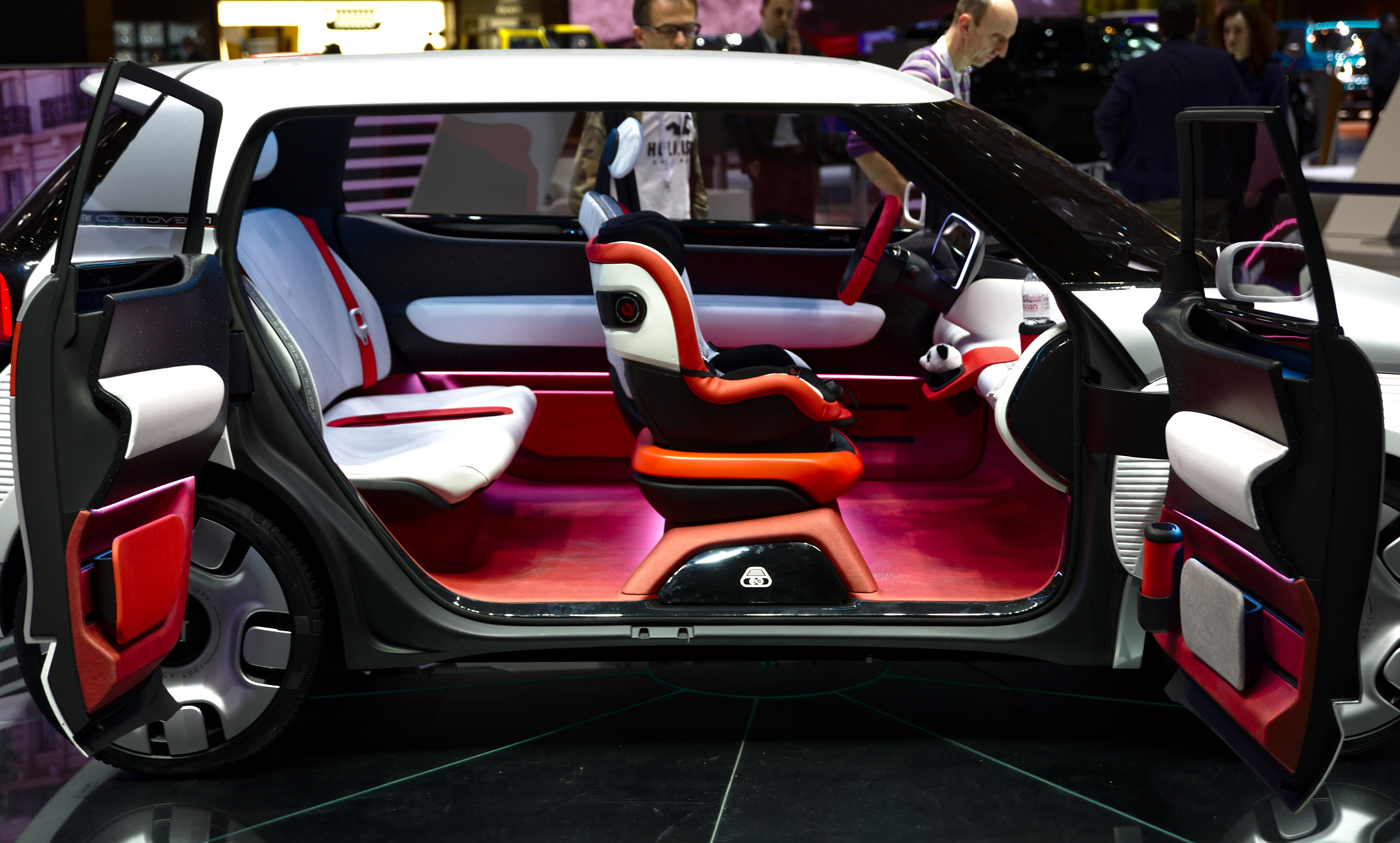
Interior

Fiat claims the modular battery design will allow this to be "the least expensive BEV on the market", but no production date was announced.

The Centoventi is a compact four-seat city car 3,680 mm (144.9 in) long, 1,527 mm (60.1 in) high and 1,846 mm (72.7 in) wide, sitting on a wheelbase of 2,420 mm (95.3 in). The interior is designed for owners to personalise with a patented interlocking mounting system.
