= Rebadging =

Selling the same car under a different brand name

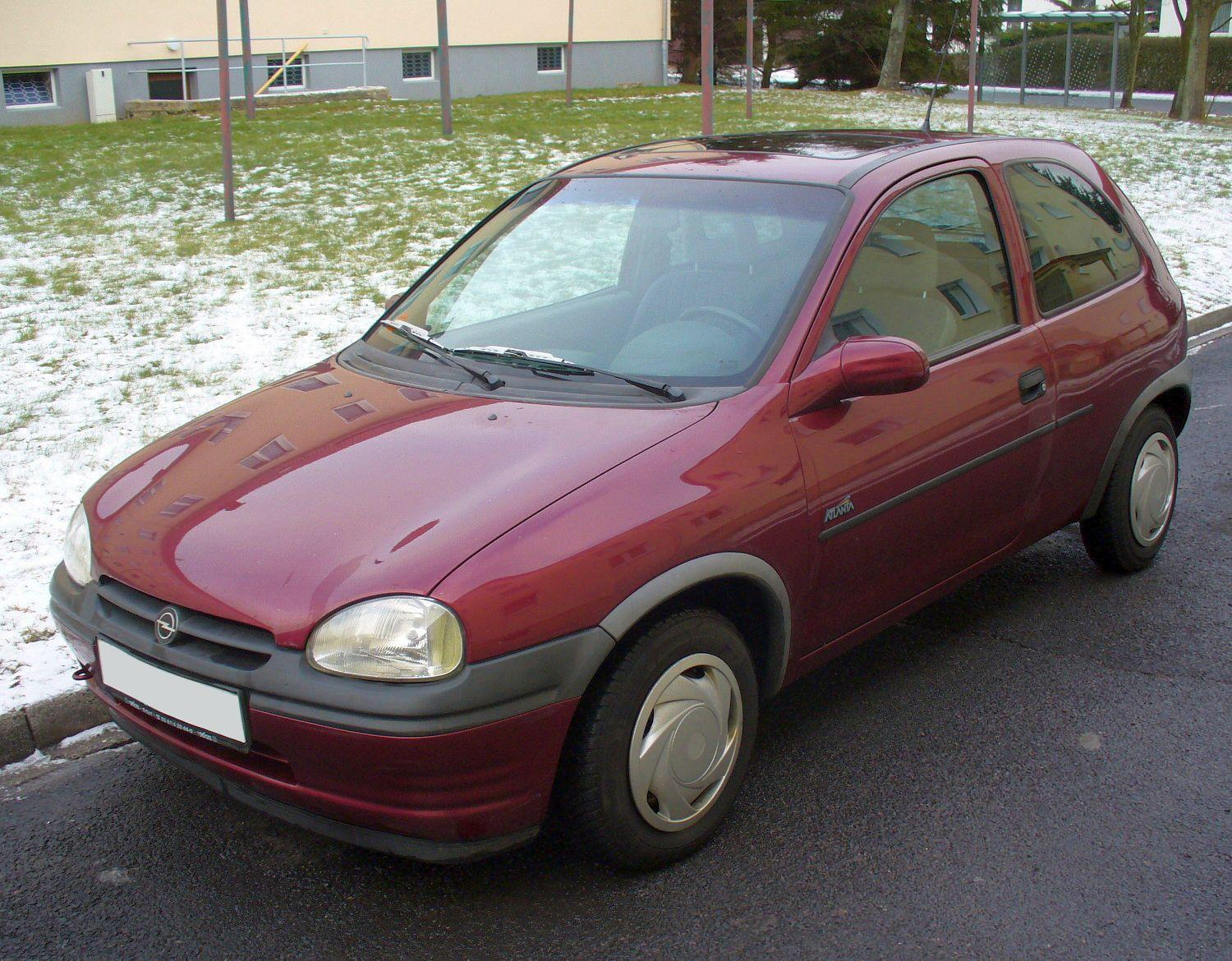
Opel Corsa B

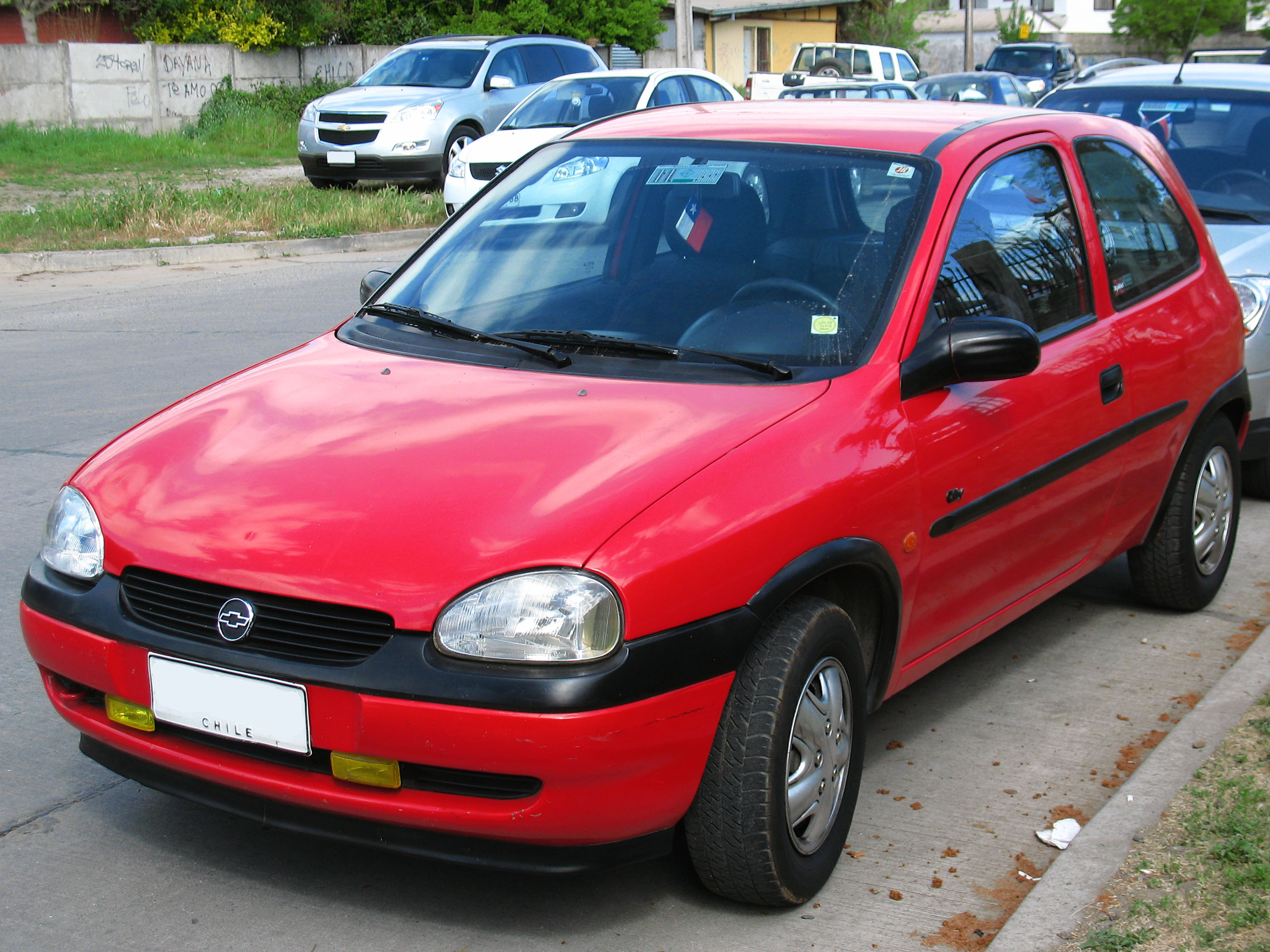
Chevrolet Corsa

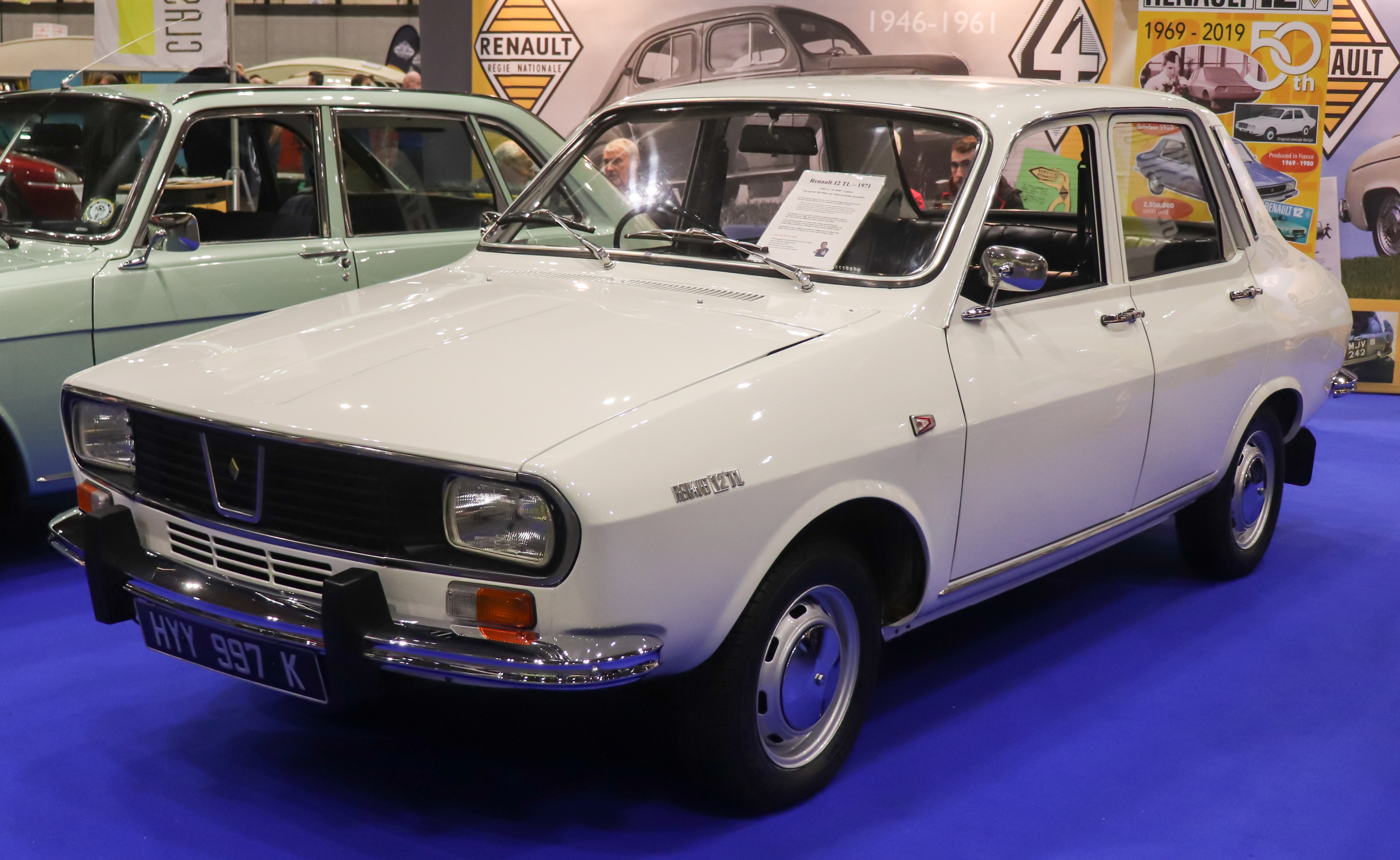
Renault 12

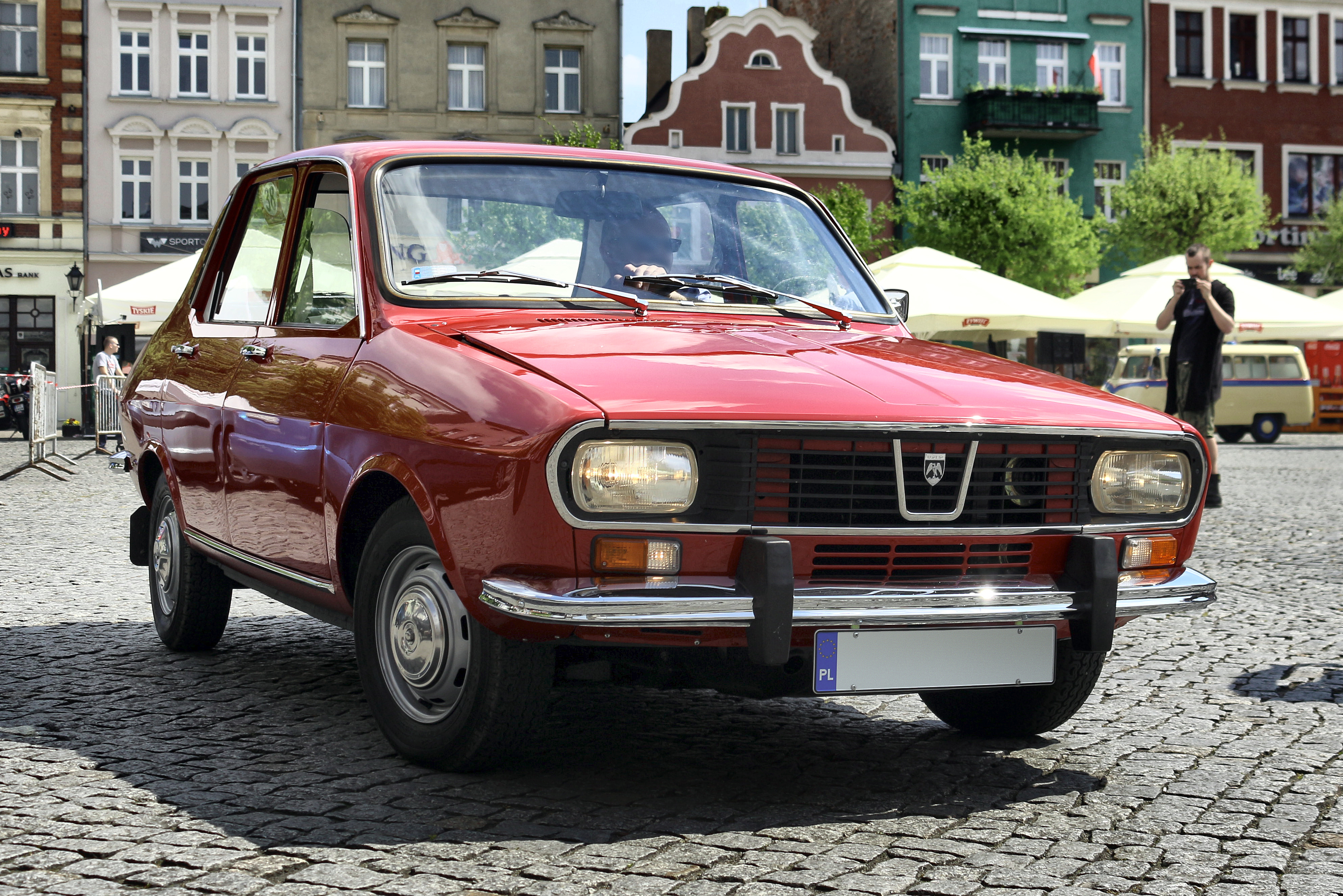
Dacia 1300

Two examples of rebadging in Opel (above) and Renault vehicles. The Corsa has also been rebadged under other marques of General Motors such as Vauxhall or Holden.

In the automotive industry, rebadging (also known as badge engineering, an intentionally ironic misnomer in that little or no actual engineering takes place) is a form of market segmentation used by automobile manufacturers around the world. To allow for product differentiation without designing or engineering a new model or brand (at high cost or risk), a manufacturer creates a distinct automobile by applying a new "badge" or trademark (brand, logo, or manufacturer's name/make/marque) to an existing product line.

The term originated with the practice of replacing an automobile's emblems to create an ostensibly new model sold by a different maker. Changes may be confined to swapping badges and emblems, or may encompass minor styling differences, as with cosmetic changes to headlights, taillights, front and rear fascias, and even outer body skins. More extreme examples involve differing engines and drivetrains. The objective is "to spread the huge development costs of a new vehicle over as many cars as possible". An example is General Motors' rebadging of the Camaro as the Firebird, a successful model from the 1960s through to the 2000s. In most cases, consumers are interested in each brand's focus "on the unique elements of styling and driving characteristics". Some cars would not be marketed without the cost savings that are obtained from this practice, and carmakers can develop many "different models – all wearing different badges – off the one platform".

In several countries including Japan, manufacturers often use the phrase "OEM supply" or "OEM-supplied" to denote vehicles that are a rebadged model from or for other manufacturers.

Although platform sharing can often involve rebadging and rebranding, it can extend further, as the design may be used across multiple configurations. For example, a single platform may underpin a sedan, hatchback, or SUV/CUV body designs.

Automotive industry rebadging can be compared with white-label products in other consumer goods industries, such as consumer electronics and power tools.

== History ==
The first known case of badge engineering appeared in 1917 with the Texan automobile assembled in Fort Worth, Texas, that made use of Elcar bodies made in Elkhart, Indiana.

"Probably the industry's first example of one car becoming another" was by Nash Motors. The automaker did not offer a car in the booming low-priced entry-level market dominated by Ford and Chevrolet. The chairman and CEO of the company, Charles W. Nash did not want to tarnish the "Nash" nameplate by introducing an inexpensive economy car that might dilute the brand's reputation for premium engineering. His solution was to establish a completely new, wholly owned subsidiary brand assembled in a newly acquired plant in Racine, Wisconsin (the former Mitchell Motor Car Co. factory). Named after the mythological Greek hero, the Ajax was introduced in spring 1925. It was purpose-built with advanced features for its price point. However, buyers were hesitant to purchase an entirely new marque, and sales did not match production capacity. By mid 1926, Nash decided that selling cars under two separate brands was inefficient and expensive. He decided to instill buyer confidence and leverage the main brand's reputation. The Ajax company was absorbed and the cars were rebranded as the "Nash Light Six". Production was stopped for two days so Nash emblems, hubcaps, and radiator shells could be exchanged on all unshipped Ajax cars. The cars made in the Racine plant remained the same. Moreover, the 10,693 customers who had purchased an Ajax did not have to drive an "orphan" car. The automaker protected the investment they had made in purchasing an automobile made by Nash. Nash shipped no-cost "Ajax-to-Nash" conversion kits to dealers. These included a Nash radiator emblem, hubcaps with the Nash "N" logo, and new hubcap wrench inserts. Ajax owners could have their cars converted into Nash Light Sixes at no charge. The rebadging worked, and with carrying the Nash name, sales of the model increased.

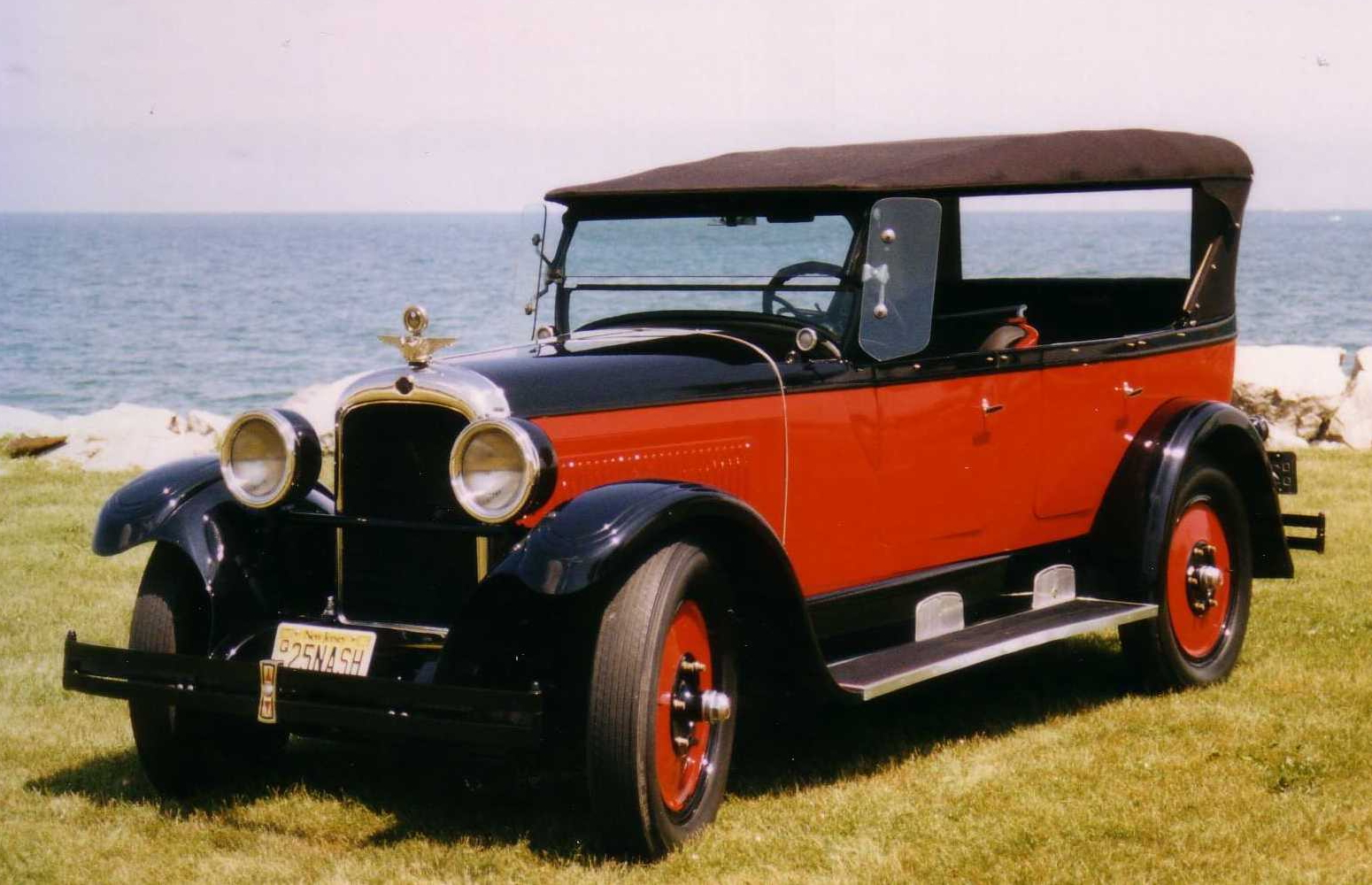
1925 Nash

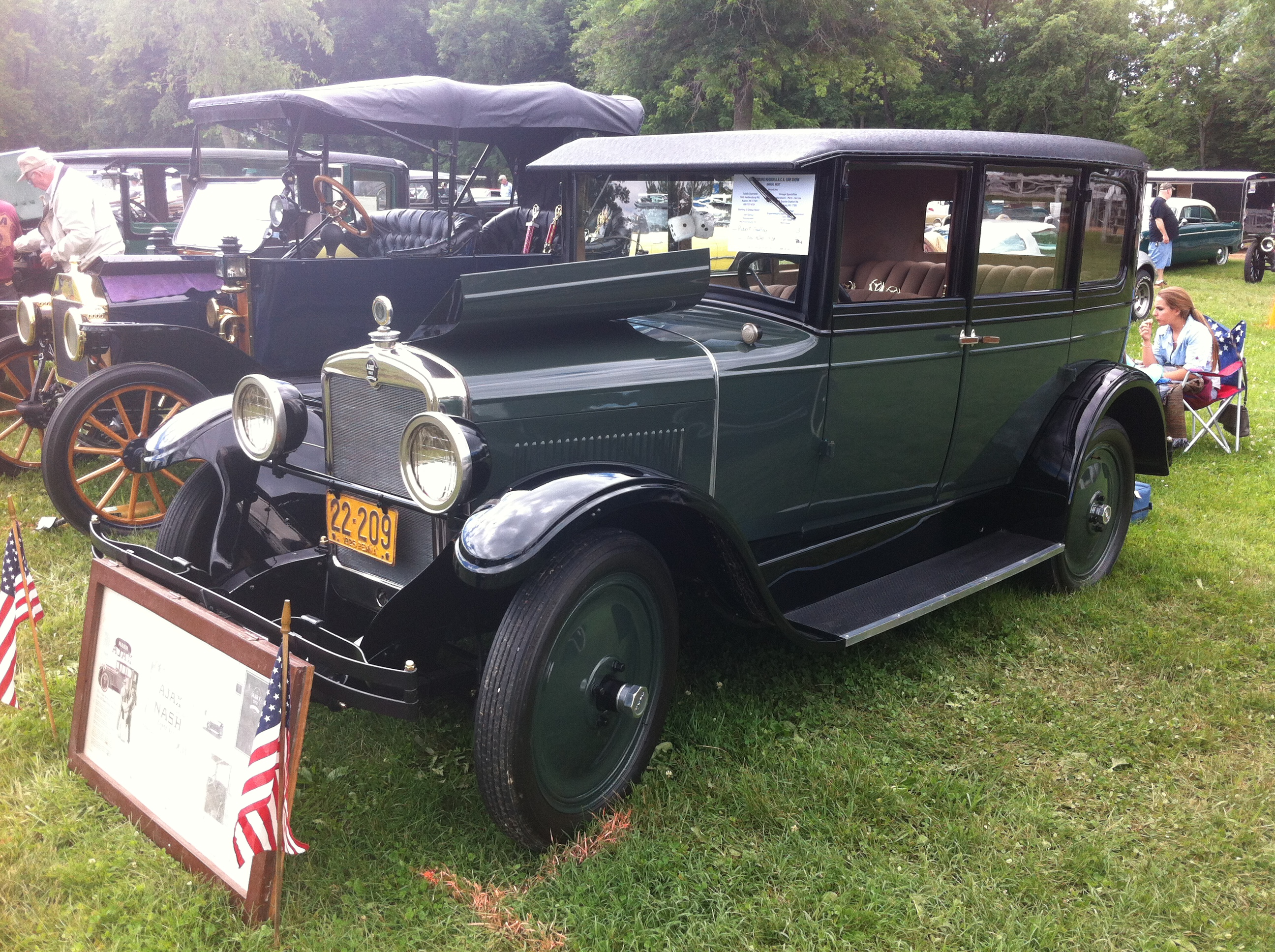
1926 Ajax

Starting with the beginning of General Motors in 1909, chassis and platforms were shared with all brands. GMC, which historically was a truck builder, began to offer its products branded as Chevrolet, and vehicles produced by GM were built on common platforms shared with Chevrolet, Oakland, Oldsmobile, Buick, and Cadillac. Exterior appearances were gradually upgraded between these vehicle brands. This was partly because all bodywork was provided by Fisher Body which was bought by GM in 1925, and the introduction of the Art and Color Section in 1928, directed by Harley Earl. For the 1958 model year, GM was promoting its fiftieth year of production and introduced anniversary models for each brand; Cadillac, Buick, Oldsmobile, Pontiac, and Chevrolet. The 1958 models shared an almost identical appearance on all models for each brand and made special luxury models with a shared appearance; Cadillac Eldorado Seville, Buick Limited Riviera, Oldsmobile Starfire 98, Pontiac Bonneville Catalina, and the Chevrolet Bel-Air Impala.

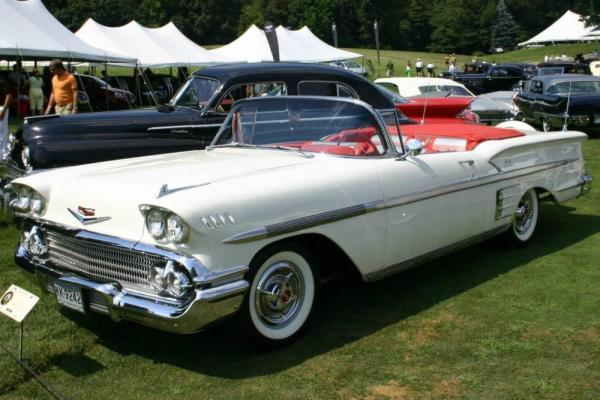
1958 Chevrolet Bel Air Impala Convertible

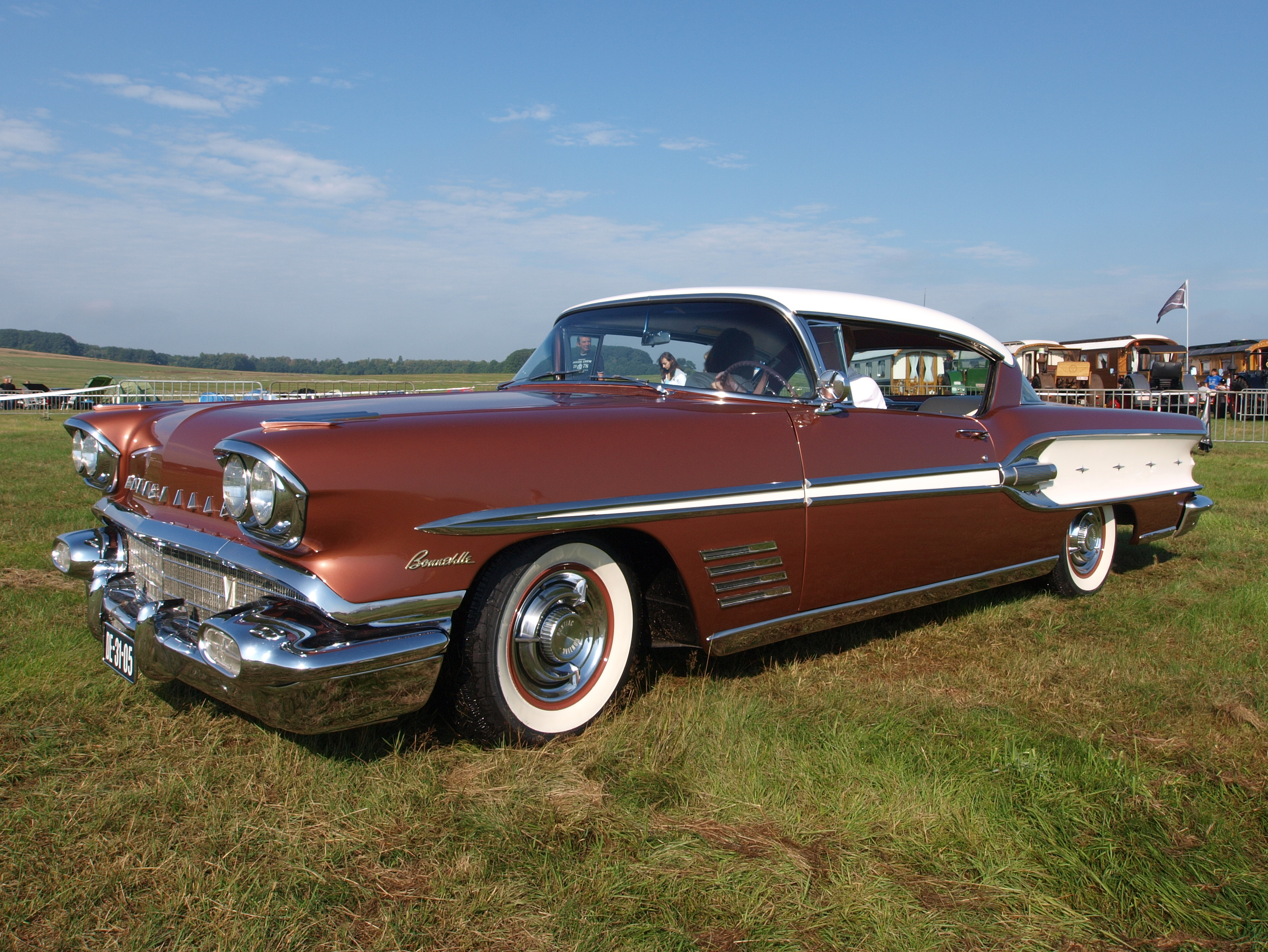
1958 Pontiac Bonneville Catalina

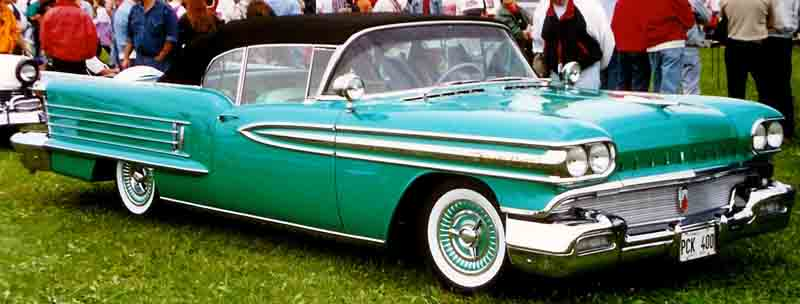
1958 Oldsmobile 98 Convertible

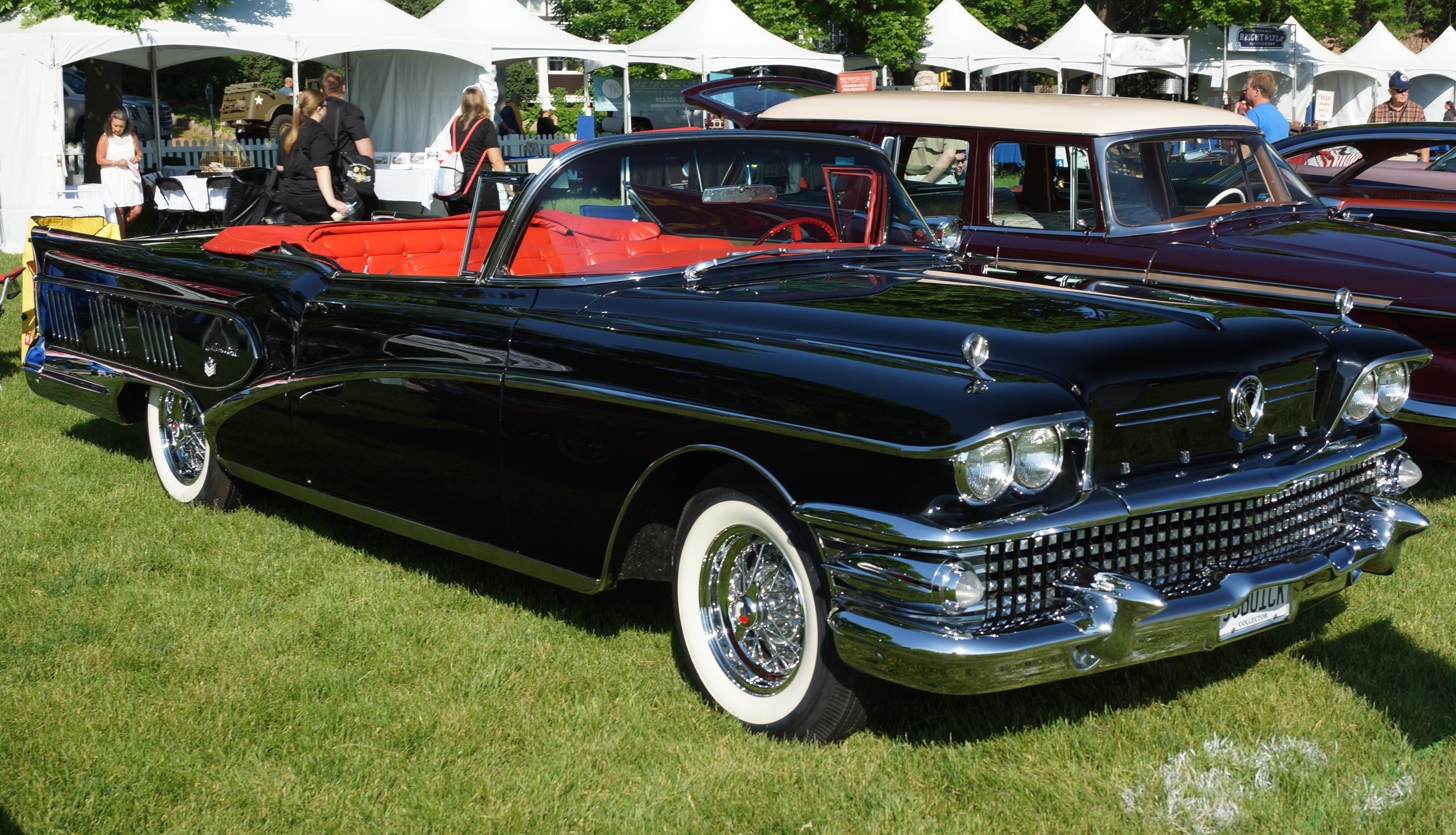
1958 Buick Limited Riviera

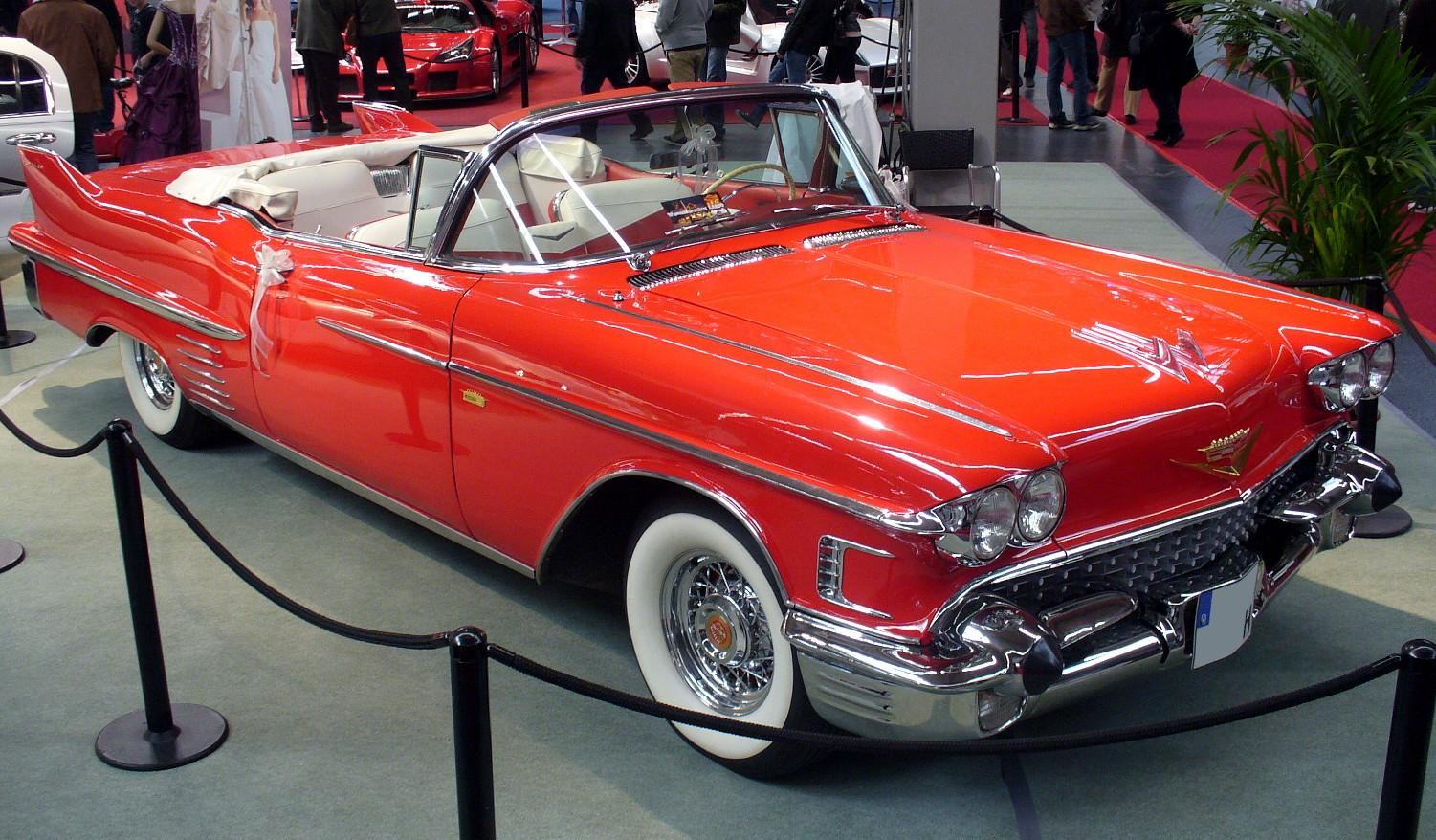
1958 Cadillac Eldorado

A later example was Wolseley Motors after it was bought out by William Morris. After World War I, "Wolseley started to lose its identity and eventually succumbed to badge engineering." This was repeated with the consolidation of Austin Motor Company and the Nuffield Organization (parent company of Morris Motors) to form the British Motor Corporation (BMC). The rationalization of production to gain efficiencies "did not extend to marketing", and each "model was adapted, by variation in trim and accessories, to appeal to customer loyalties for whom the badge denoting the company of origin was an important selling advantage ... 'Badge Engineering', as it became known, was symptomatic of a policy of sales competition between the constituent organizations". The ultimate example of BMC badge engineering was the 1962 BMC ADO16 which was available badged as a Morris, MG, Austin, Wolseley, Riley and the upmarket Vanden Plas. A year earlier, the Mini was also available as Austin, Morris, Riley, and Wolseley – the latter two having slightly bigger boots.

== Examples ==
=== Regional brands ===
Badge engineering often occurs when an individual manufacturer (such as the regional Big Threes of the United States, Europe, and Japan) owns a portfolio of different brands and markets the same car under different brands and nameplates. The practice is used for multiple reasons. In one example, a company may do so to expand its range of different brands in a market without the cost of developing completely new models. In the United States, General Motors may sell a car through each brand; for example, the Chevrolet Tahoe, GMC Yukon, and Cadillac Escalade each share a common body.

In another example, the same model is rebadged when it is sold in different regions and markets. In Australia, during the 1980s and 1990s, the Button car plan required imported Nissans and Toyotas to adopt Ford and Holden (GM) nameplates. In the United Kingdom, Opel-produced vehicles are marketed under the Vauxhall brand; when sold in the United States, Opels were marketed as Saturns, Chevrolets, and Buicks. Conversely, the Australian Holden brand was never sold in North America, but the Holden Monaro and Holden Commodore were sold under the Pontiac (Pontiac GTO, Pontiac G8), Chevrolet (Chevrolet SS), and Buick (Buick Regal Sportback/Buick Regal TourX) nameplates.

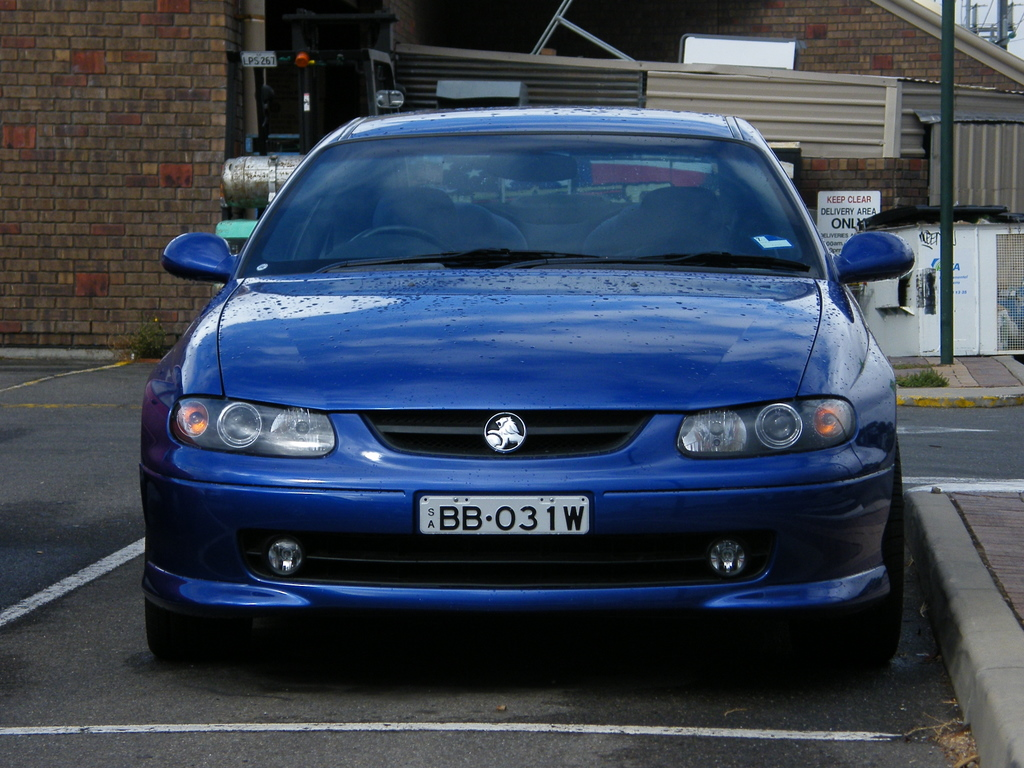
Holden Monaro

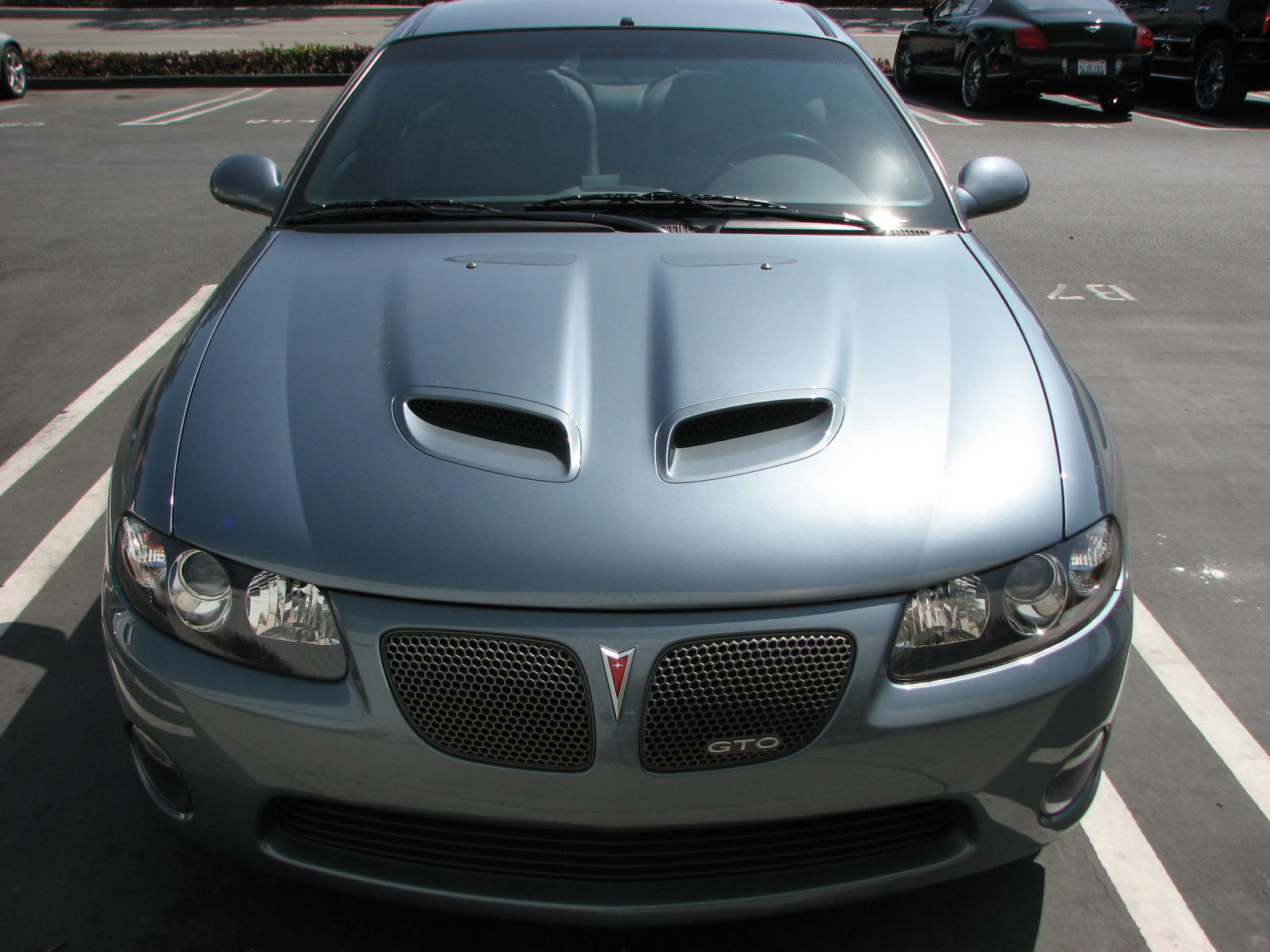
Pontiac GTO

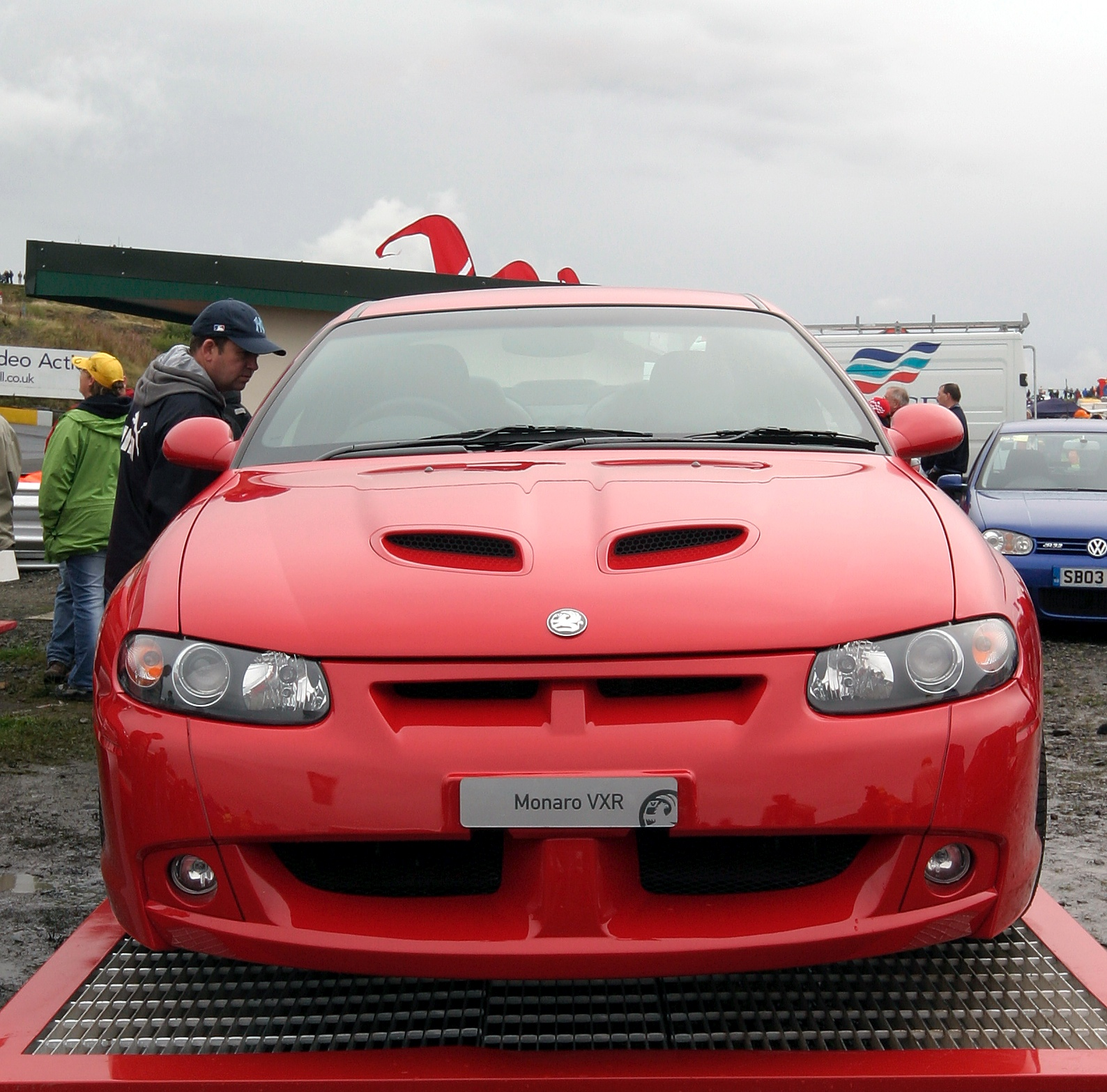
Vauxhall Monaro

Regional rebranding of the Holden Monaro V2/VX.
Left to right: Australia/New Zealand, United States, United Kingdom.

=== Brand expansion ===
Another way badge engineering may occur is when two separate manufacturers trade products, filling gaps in their respective product lineups. During the 1990s, Honda and Isuzu entered into such an agreement, with Isuzu marketing the first-generation Honda Odyssey as the Isuzu Oasis as its first minivan. In return, Honda received the Isuzu Rodeo and Isuzu Trooper SUVs, which became the Honda Passport and Acura SLX; the agreement allowed both Honda and Isuzu to enter new vehicle segments without the cost of engineering an all-new vehicle design (at the same time, in Japan, the Honda Crossroad was a rebadged Land Rover Discovery).

During the late 2000s and early 2010s, the Volkswagen Routan was a rebranded version of the Dodge Grand Caravan, supplied as Volkswagen sought to re-enter the North American minivan segment without the investment of federalizing its design. Assembled by Chrysler with a Chrysler powertrain, the Routan received its own styling and content features as well as a standard "sportier suspension and steering".

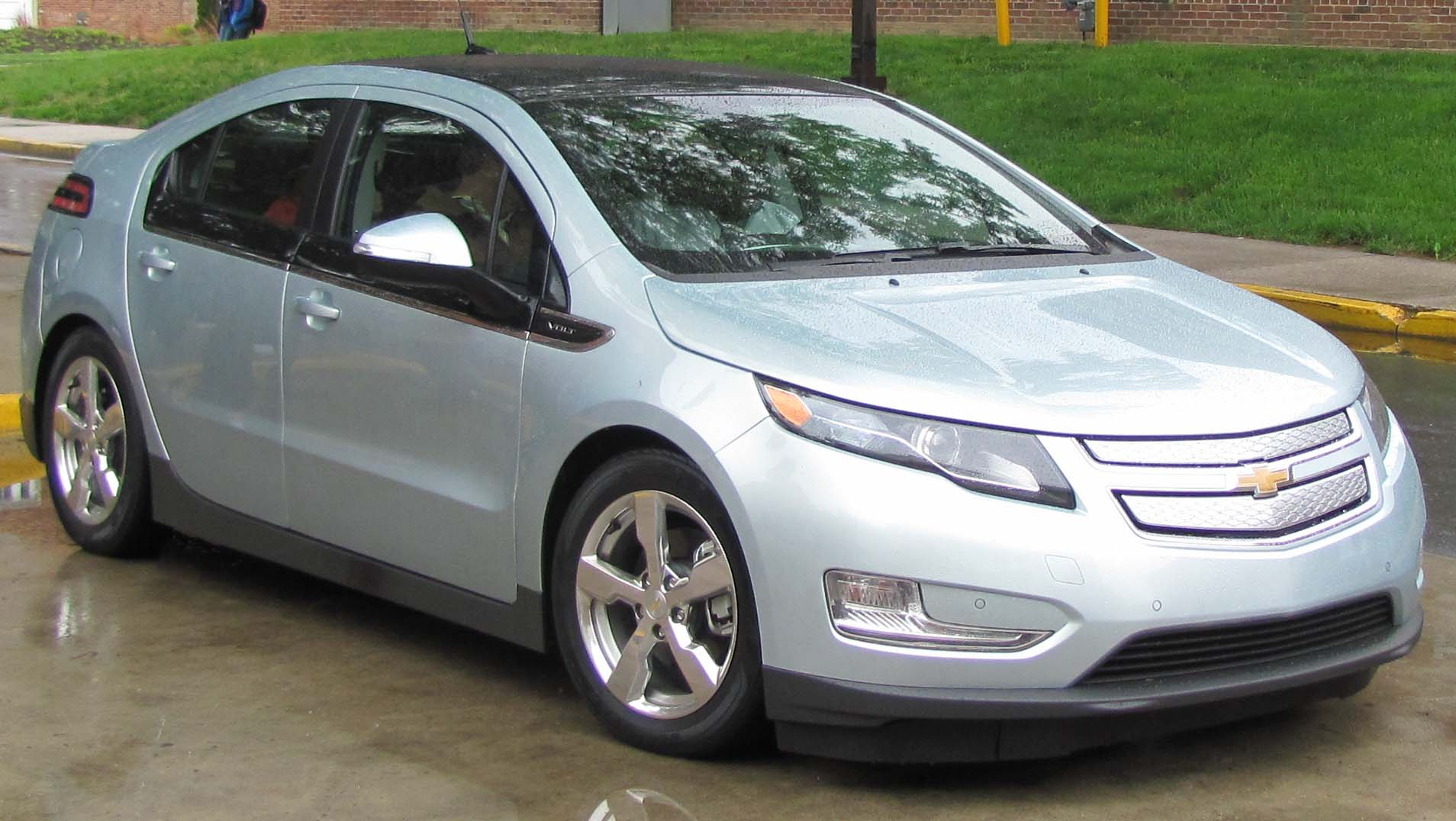
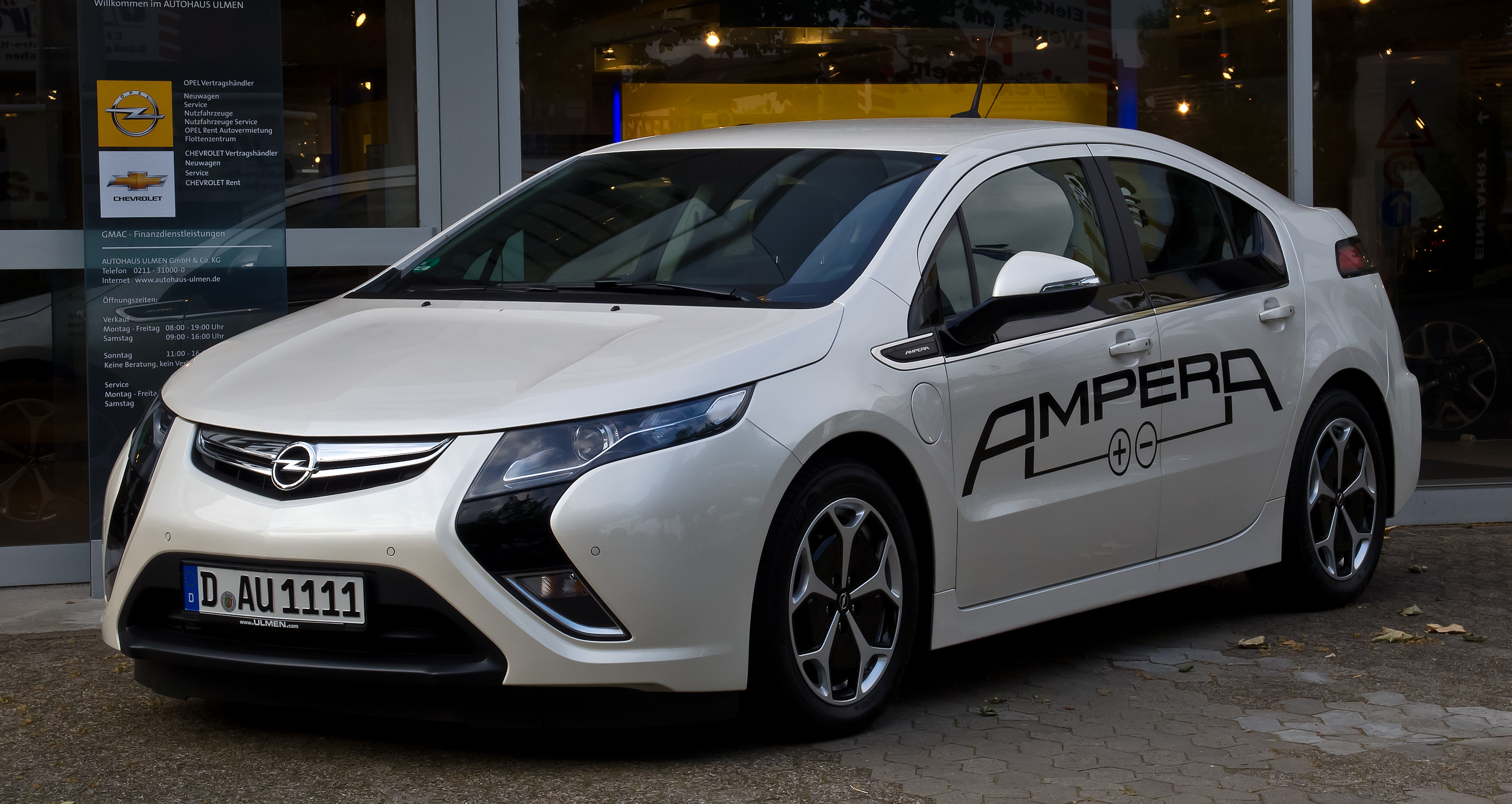
The Chevrolet Volt (left) and the Opel Ampera (right) are two mechanically, internally, and near-externally identical cars that share the majority of their components, however feature various different stylistic elements to cater to the design language of each brand.

=== Distribution networks (Japan) ===
In Japan, automobile manufacturers differed in the marketing of their product ranges. In contrast to marketing a single vehicle under multiple brand names (with minor changes to exterior bodywork), Japanese manufacturers marketed vehicles through multiple sales networks, with a distinct vehicle being sold under various model nameplates (from a single manufacturer).

Toyota marketed the Corolla in Japan exclusively at Toyota Corolla Store locations; at Toyota Auto Store locations, it was named the Toyota Sprinter. Nissan sold the Nissan Cedric through its Nissan Bluebird Store network, with the identical Nissan Gloria through the Nissan Prince Store network. Honda previously marketed the Honda Accord through multiple sales networks, marketing the Accord through the Honda Clio network and renaming it as the Honda Vigor for Honda Verno locations (conversely, the Vigor was renamed the Honda Inspire for the Clio network).

The practice of producing multiple versions of the same vehicle would eventually lead to distinct vehicles produced for export. In North America, the Toyota Sprinter was marketed as the Chevrolet Nova (and the Geo Prizm that replaced it). The Honda Vigor and Inspire were marketed as the Acura Vigor and TL; Nissan sold the Gloria in the United States as the Infiniti M45.

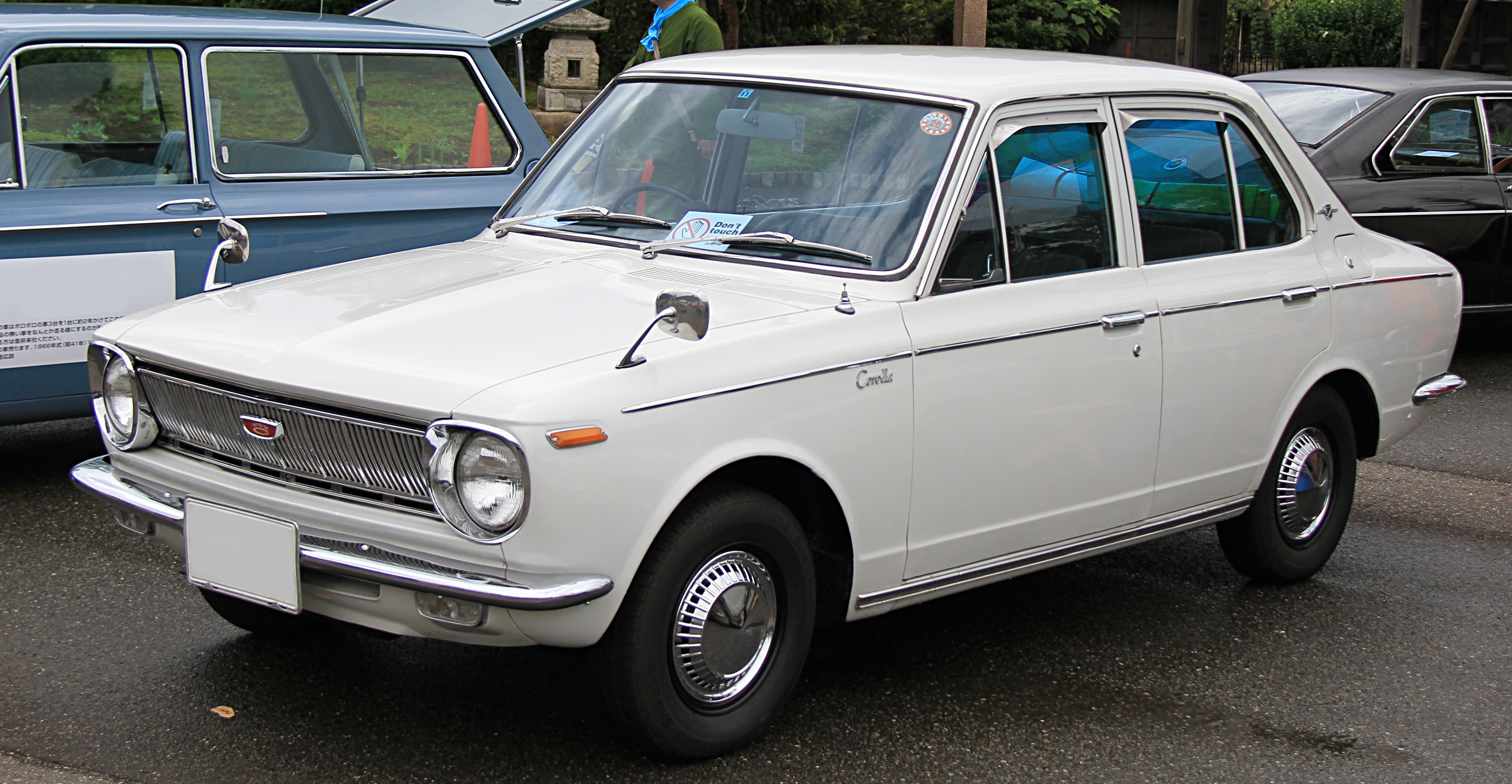
Toyota Corolla

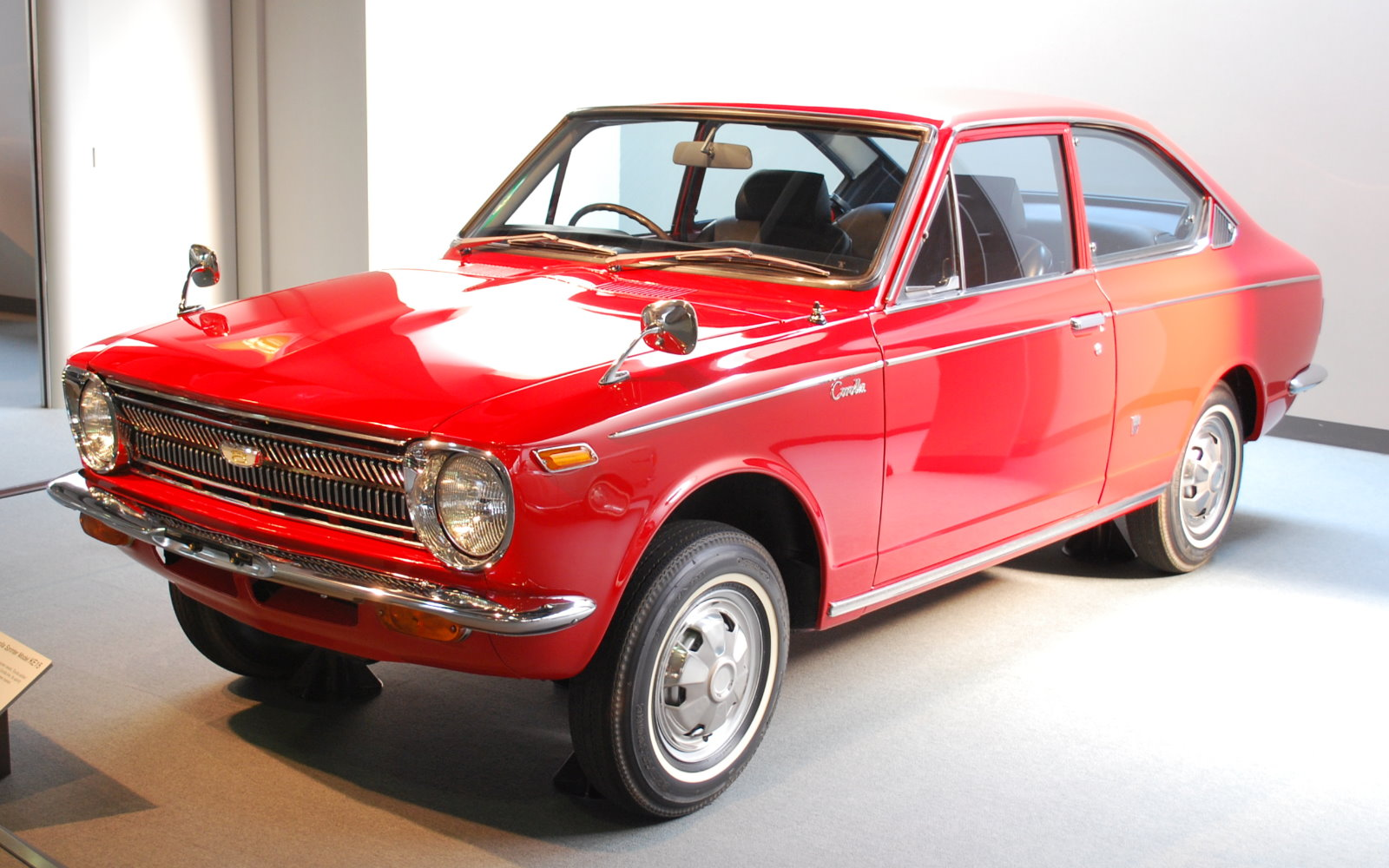
Toyota Sprinter

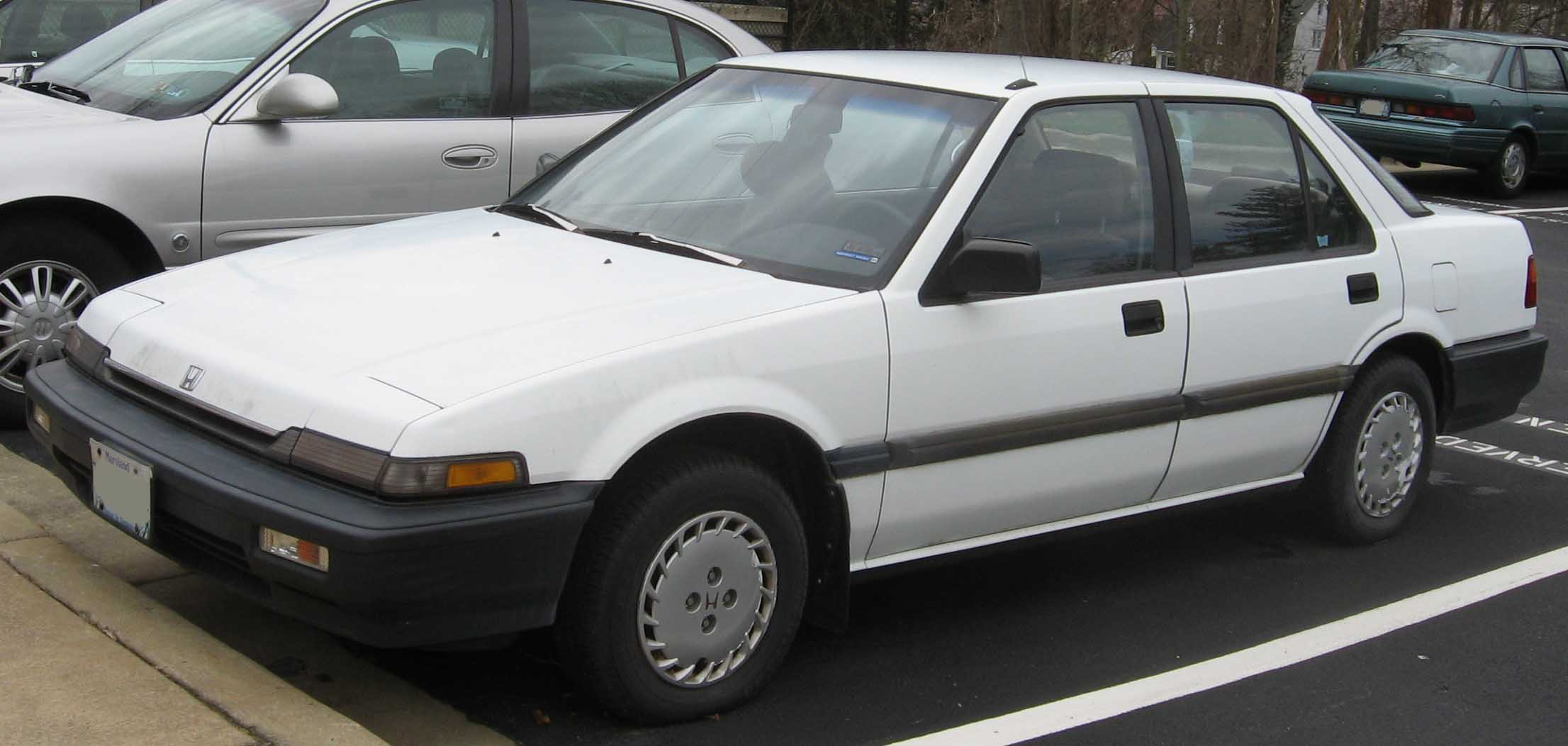
Honda Accord

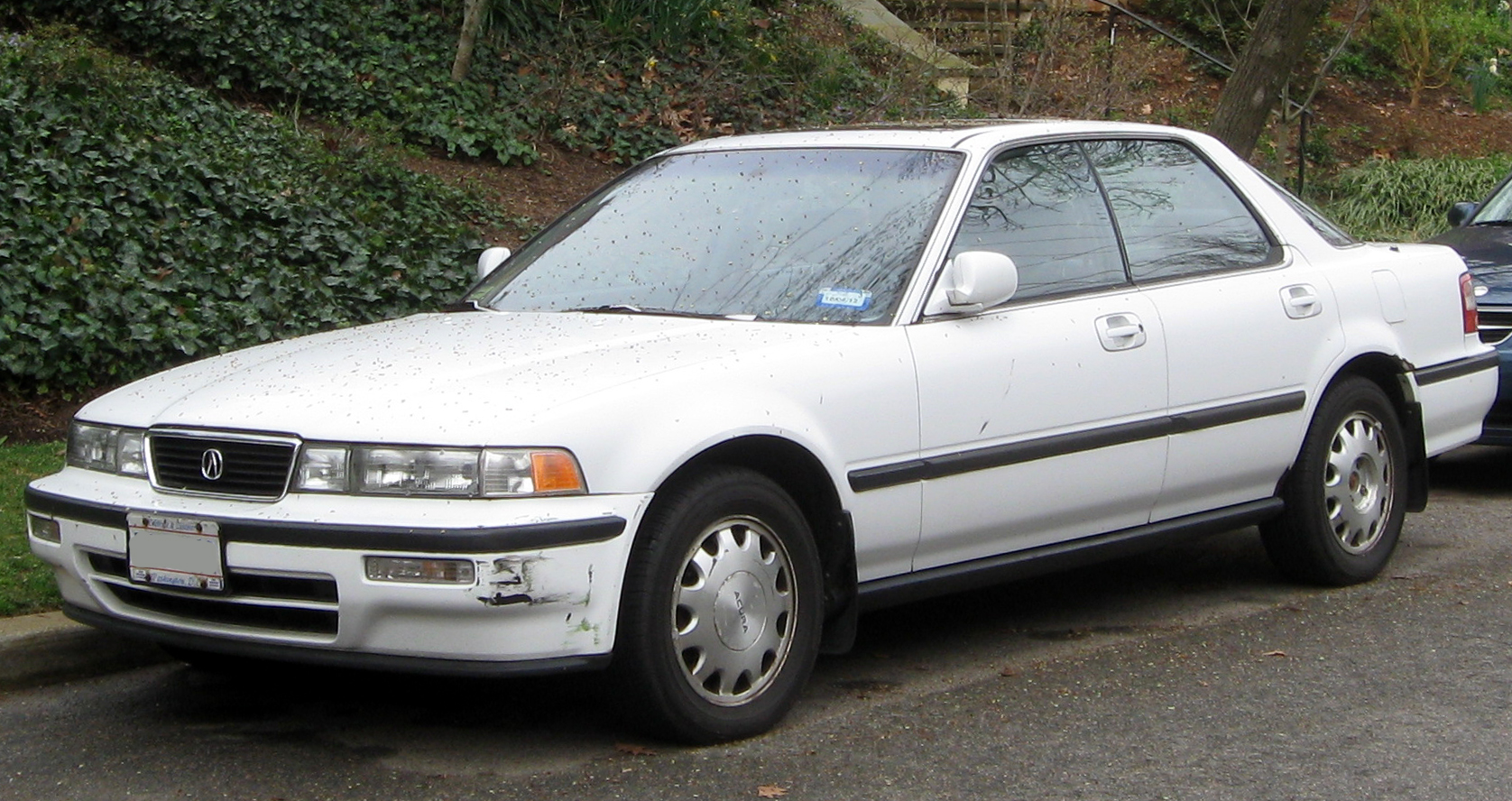
Honda Vigor

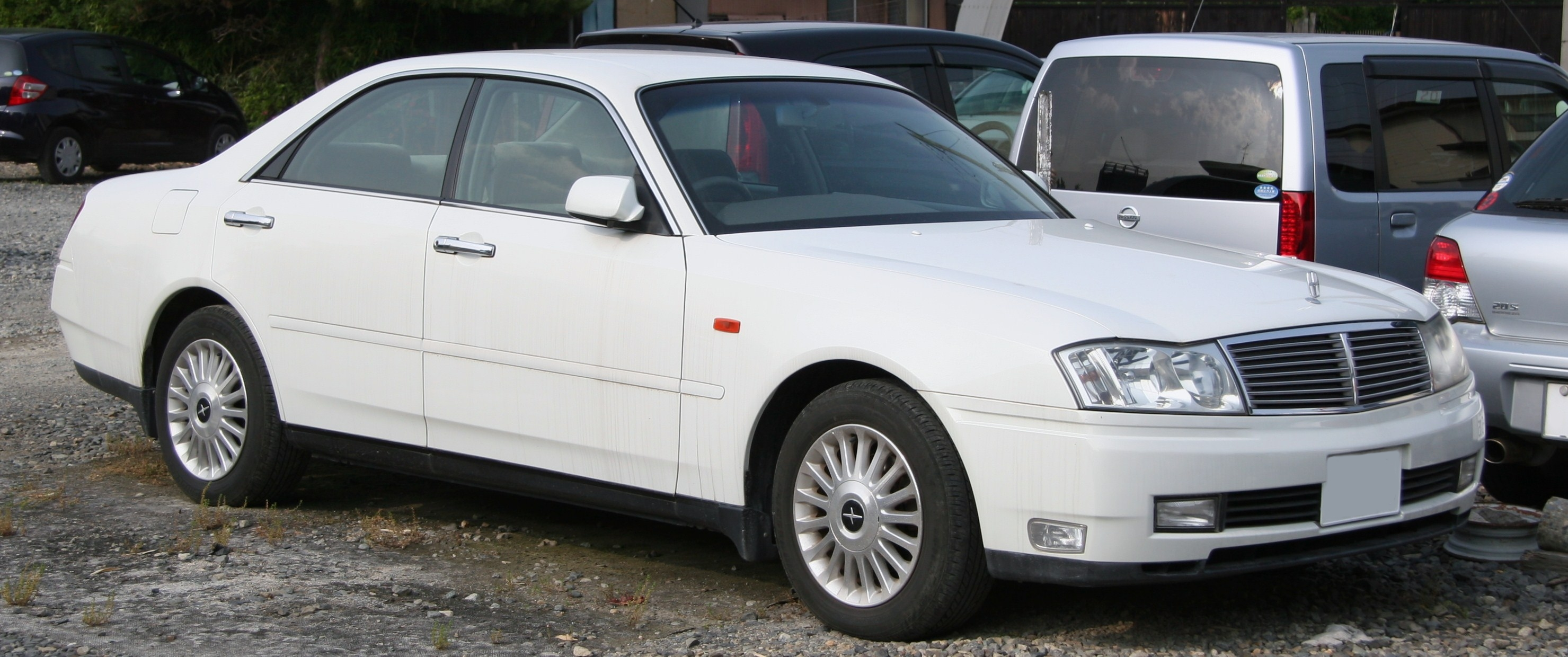
Nissan Cedric

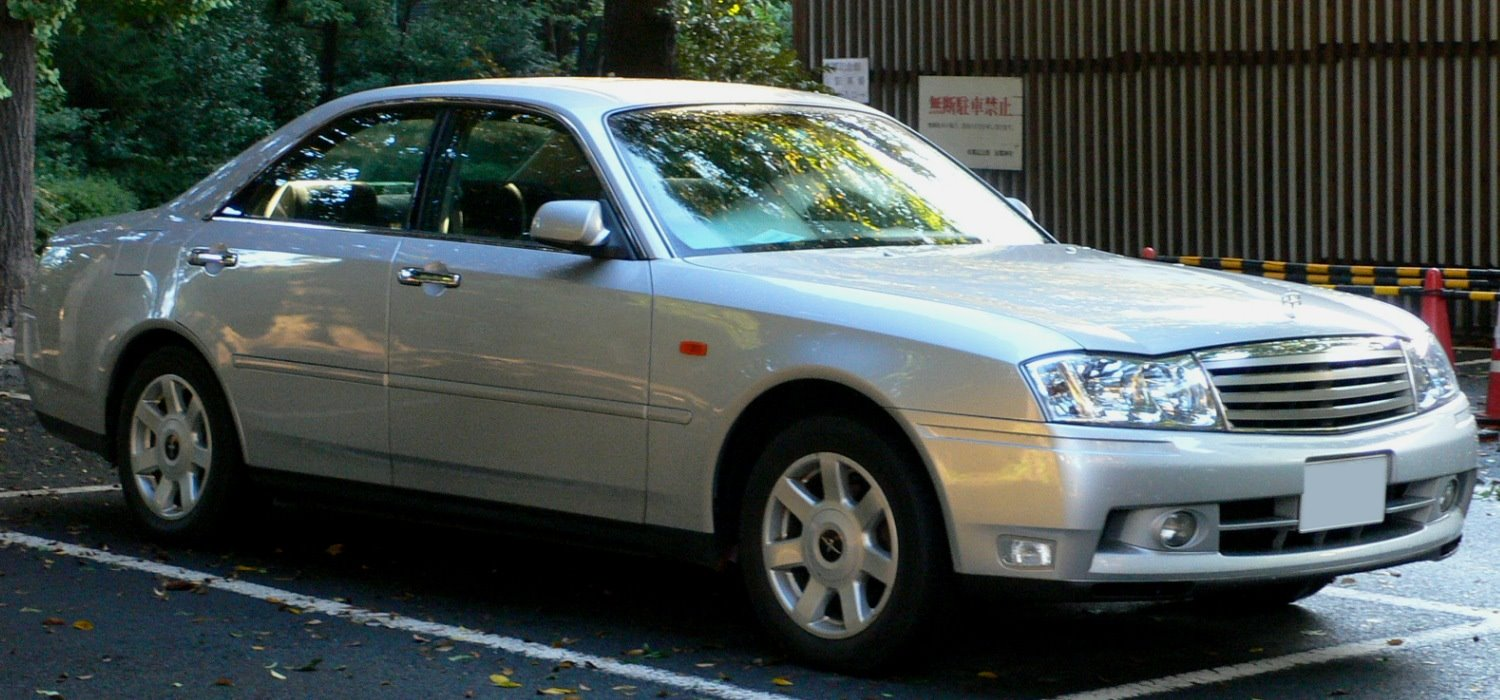
Nissan Gloria

=== Joint ventures ===
Two automakers can also pool resources by operating a joint venture to create a product and then selling each as their own. For example, General Motors and Toyota formed NUMMI. The vehicles produced from this venture (though not necessarily at NUMMI itself) included the Toyota Sprinter/Chevrolet Prizm, and later the Toyota Matrix/Pontiac Vibe. In another agreement, Ford and Nissan developed and produced the Mercury Villager and Nissan Quest minivans from 1993 through 2002.

Another example was the cooperative work between Volkswagen and Ford to develop the VW Sharan, Ford Galaxy, and SEAT Alhambra.

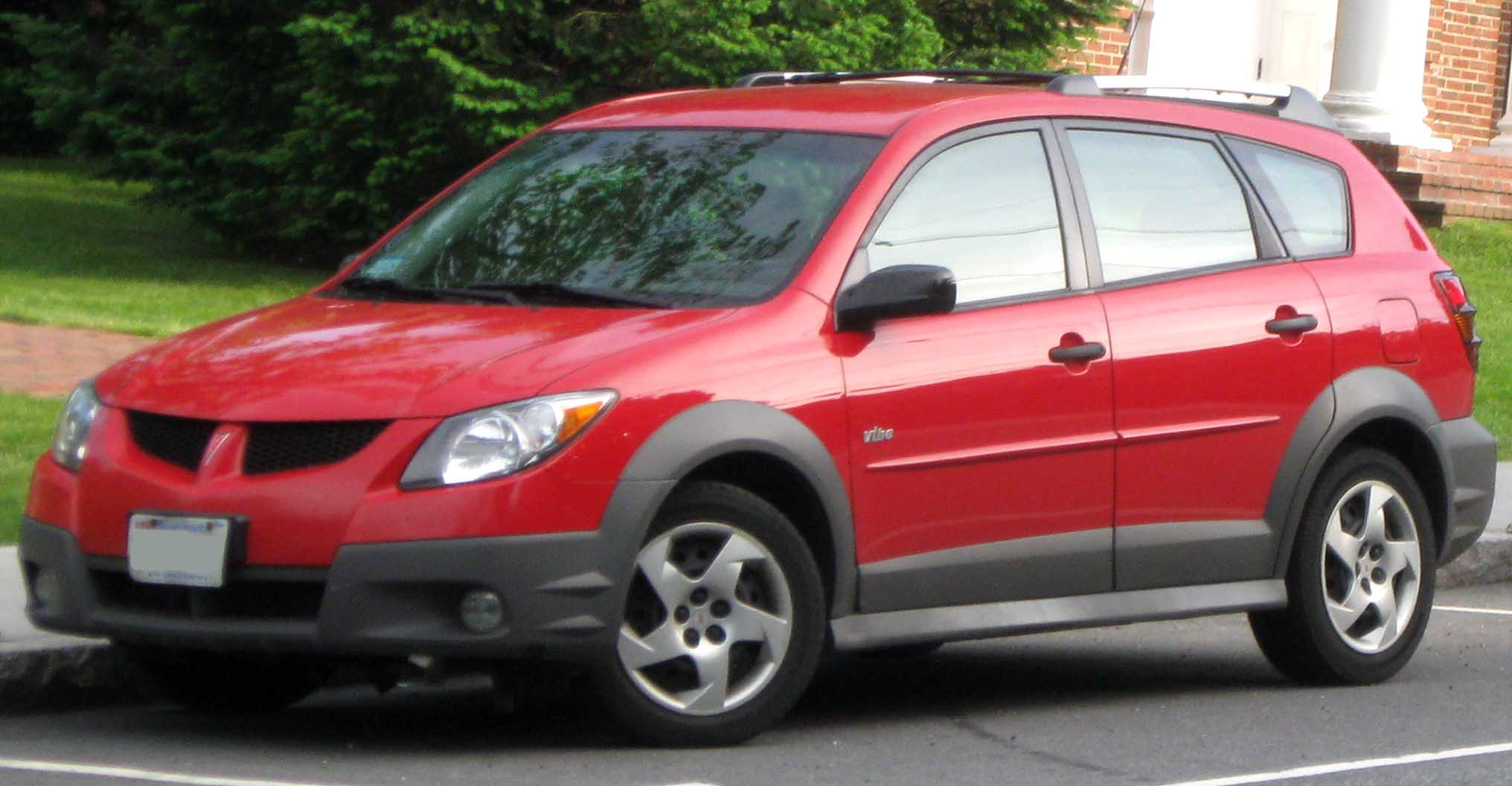
Pontiac Vibe

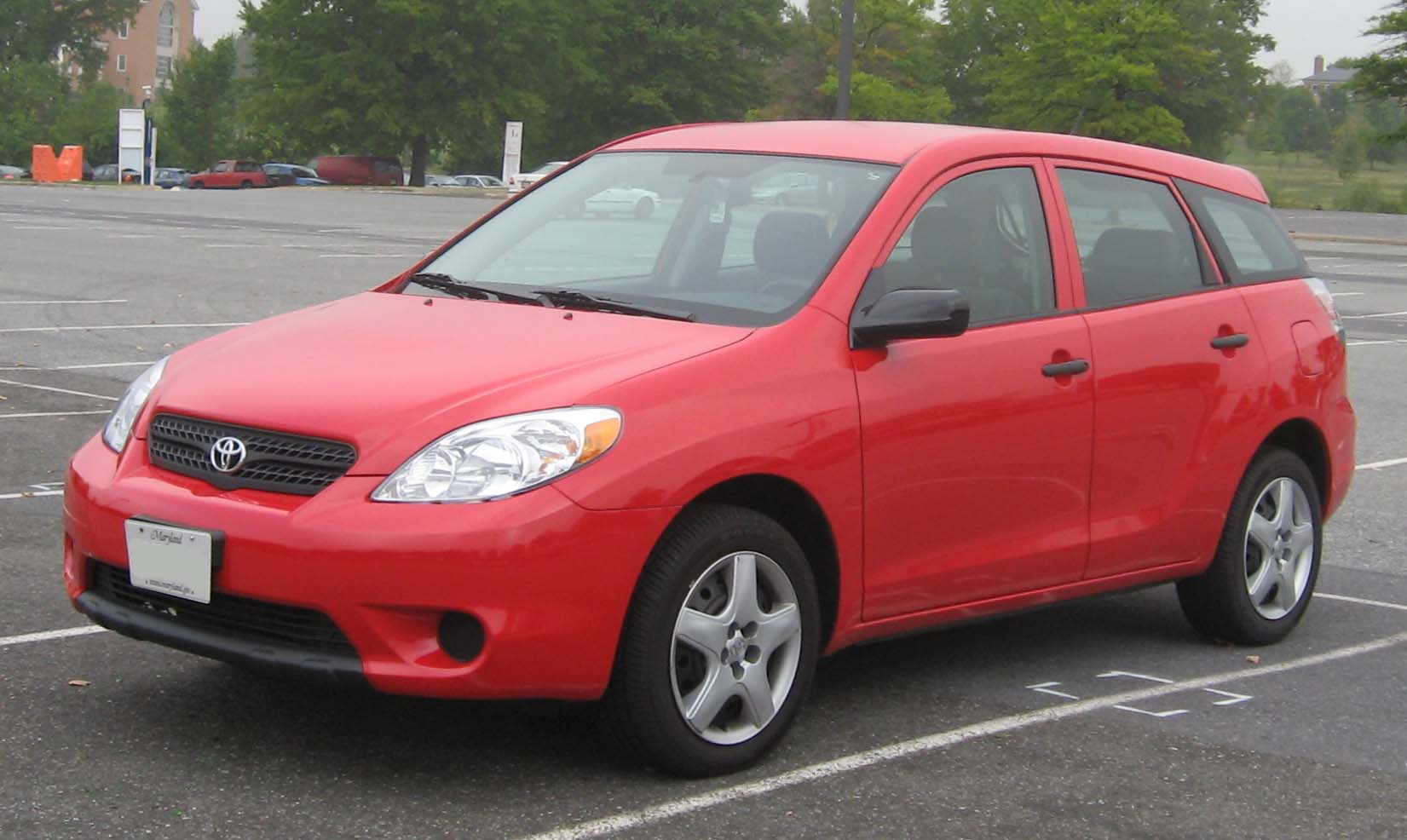
Toyota Matrix

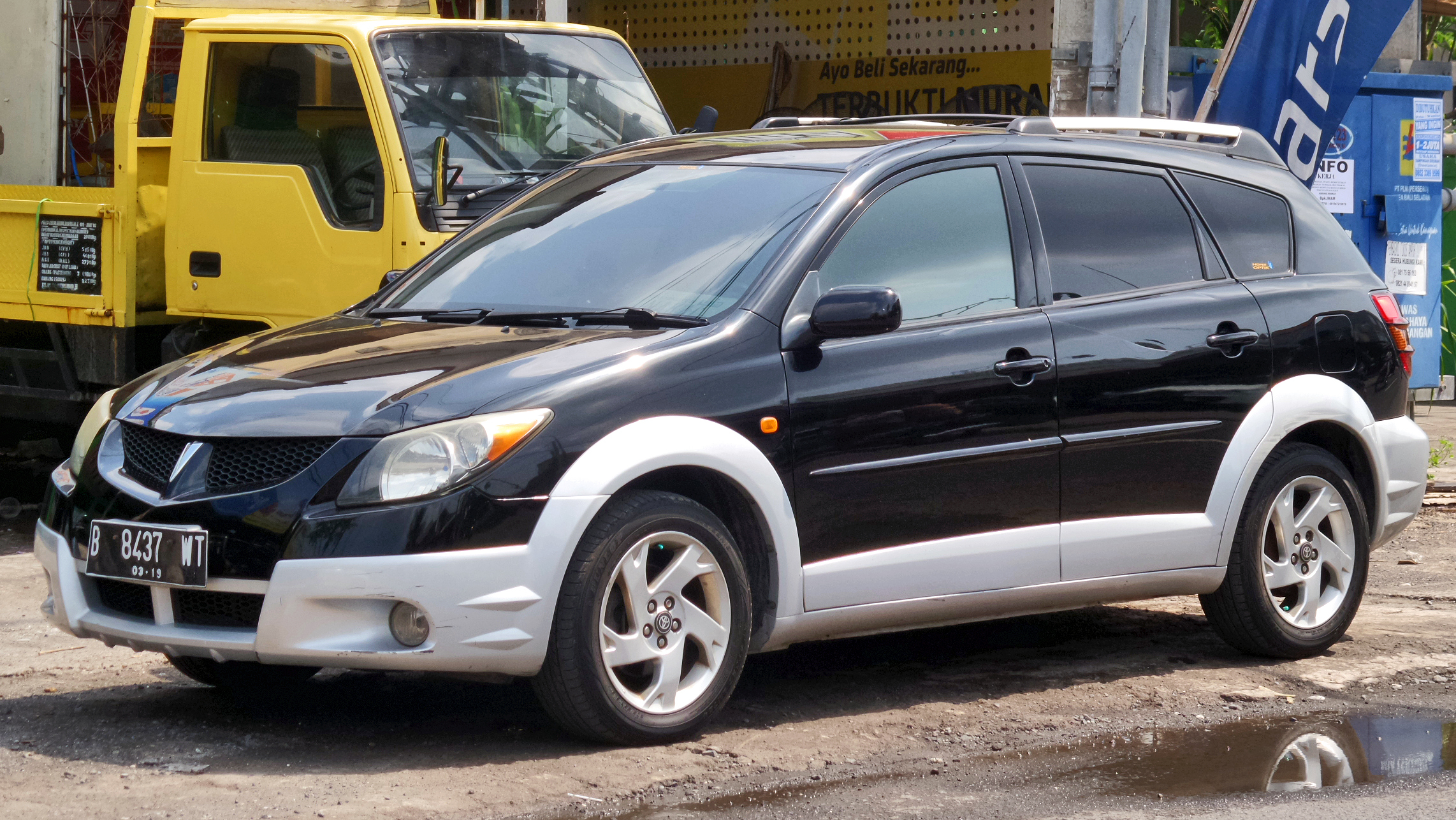
Toyota Voltz

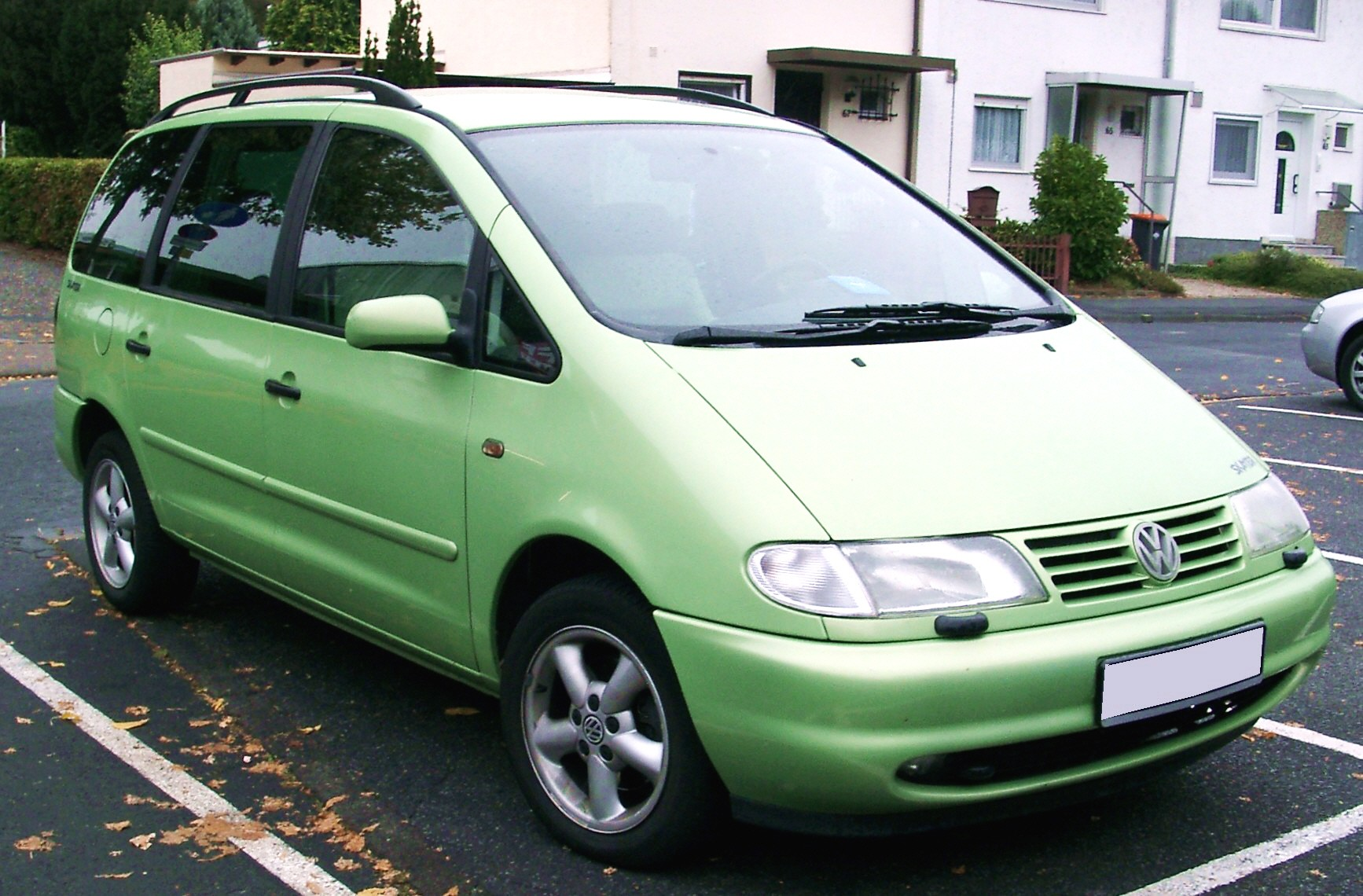
VW Sharan

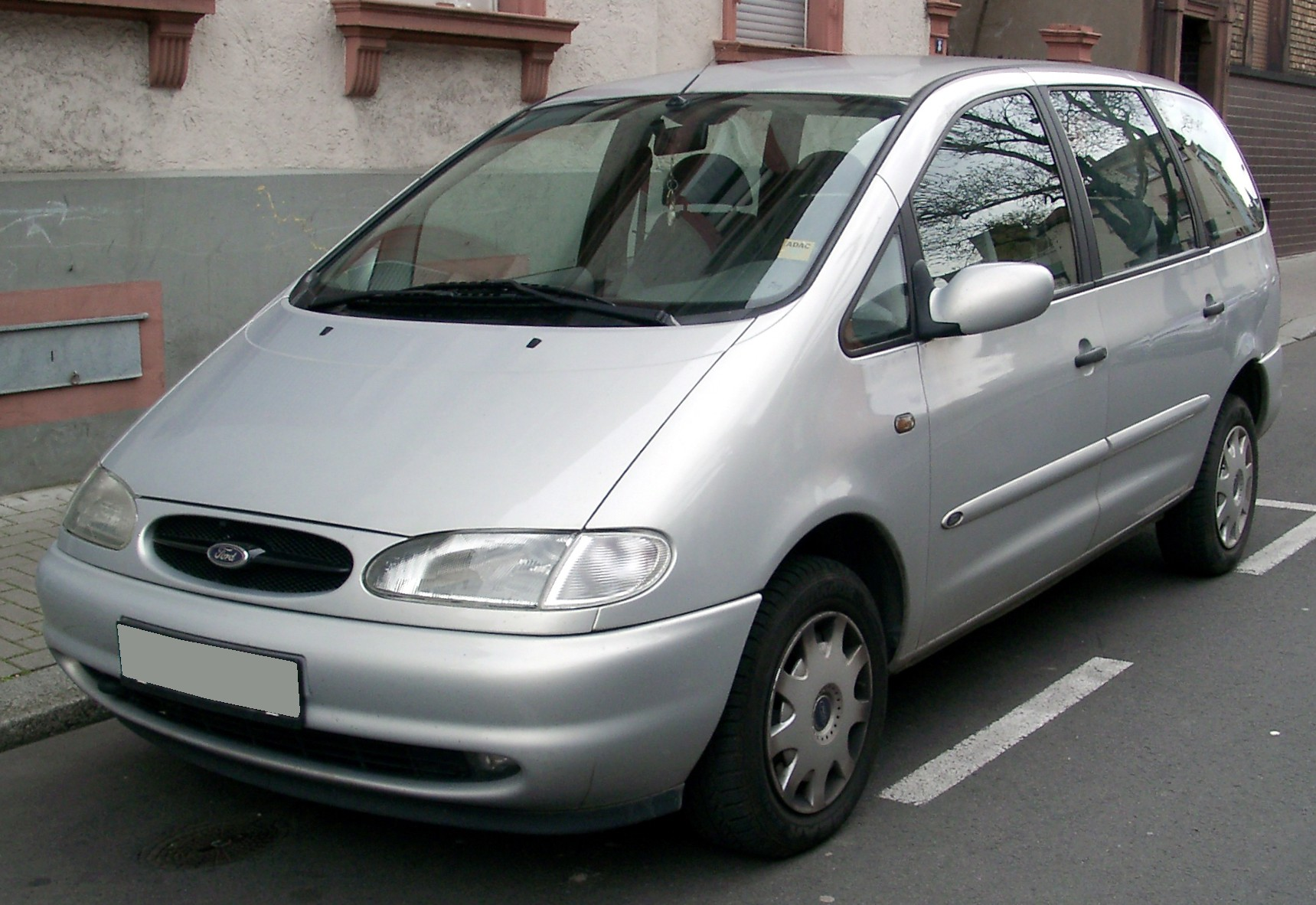
Ford Galaxy

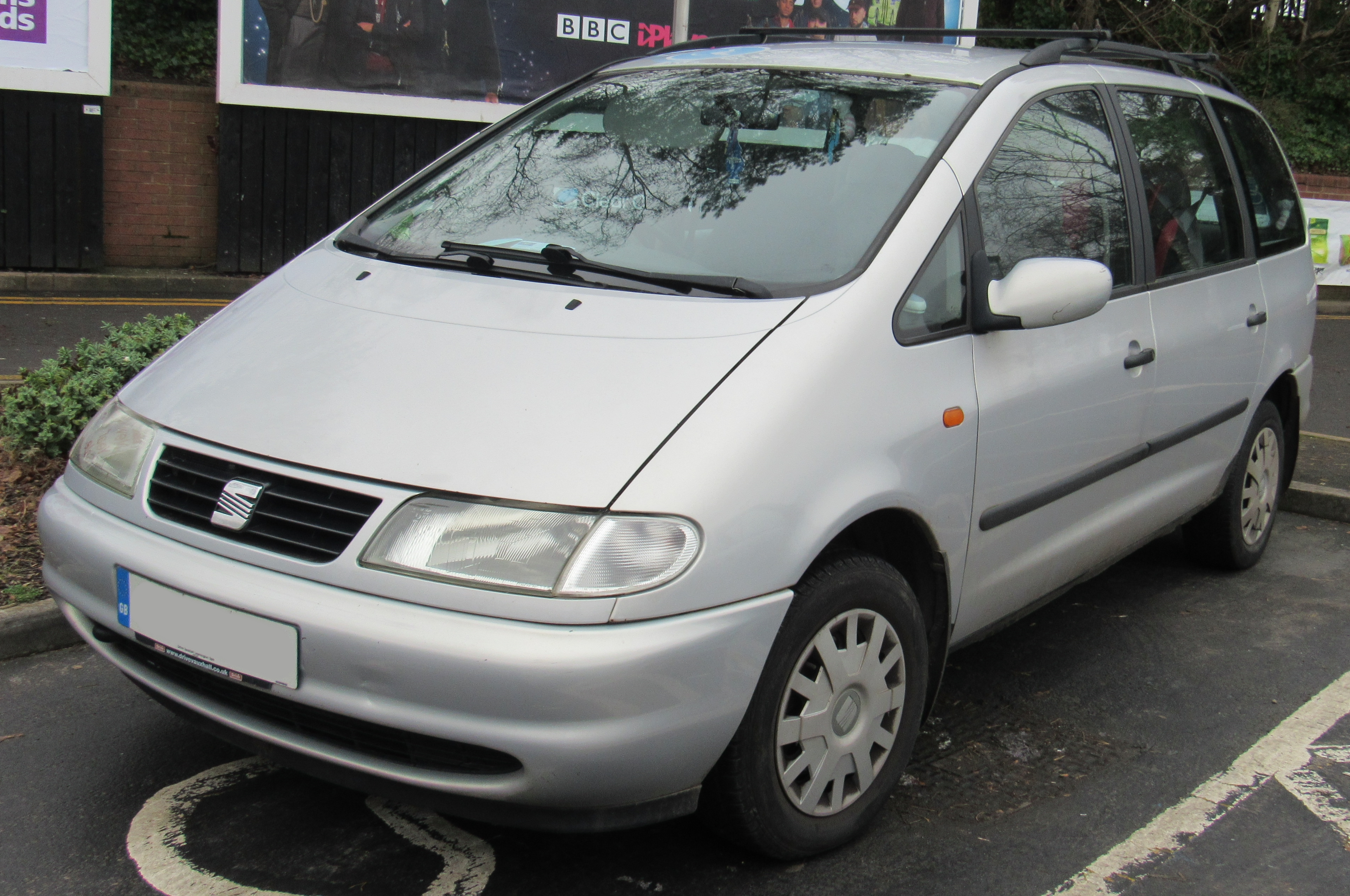
SEAT Alhambra

Badge engineering may occur when one company allows another, otherwise unaffiliated, company to market a revised version of their product through an OEM deal, as with Volkswagen marketing a modified version of the Dodge Caravan and Chrysler Town and Country minivans as the Volkswagen Routan (2009–2014).

Another example was the joint venture of Mitsubishi and Chrysler that resulted in vehicles produced by Diamond-Star Motors that were marketed under various nameplates from 1985 until 1993.

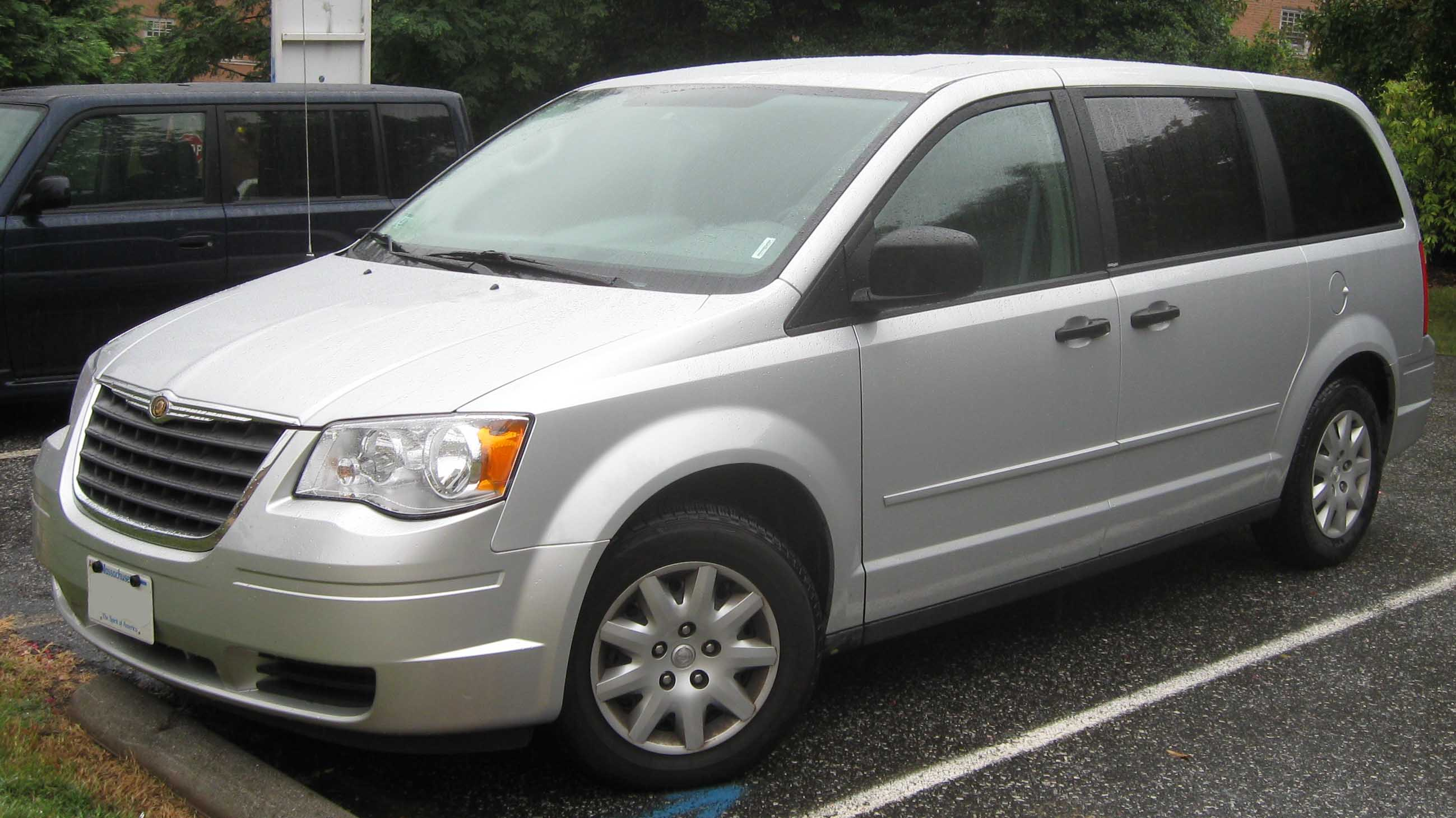
Chrysler Town & Country
(fifth generation)

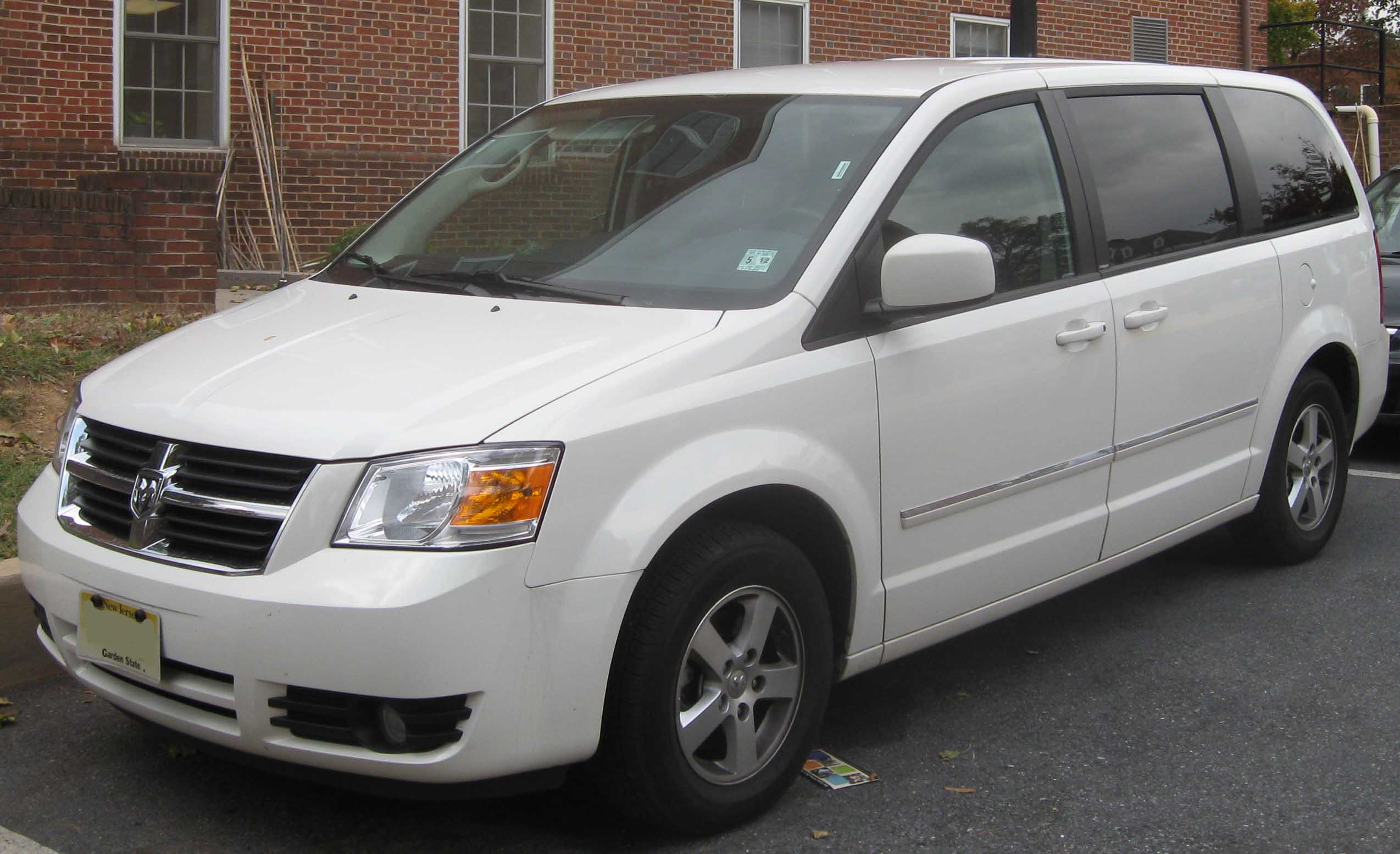
Dodge Grand Caravan
(fifth generation)

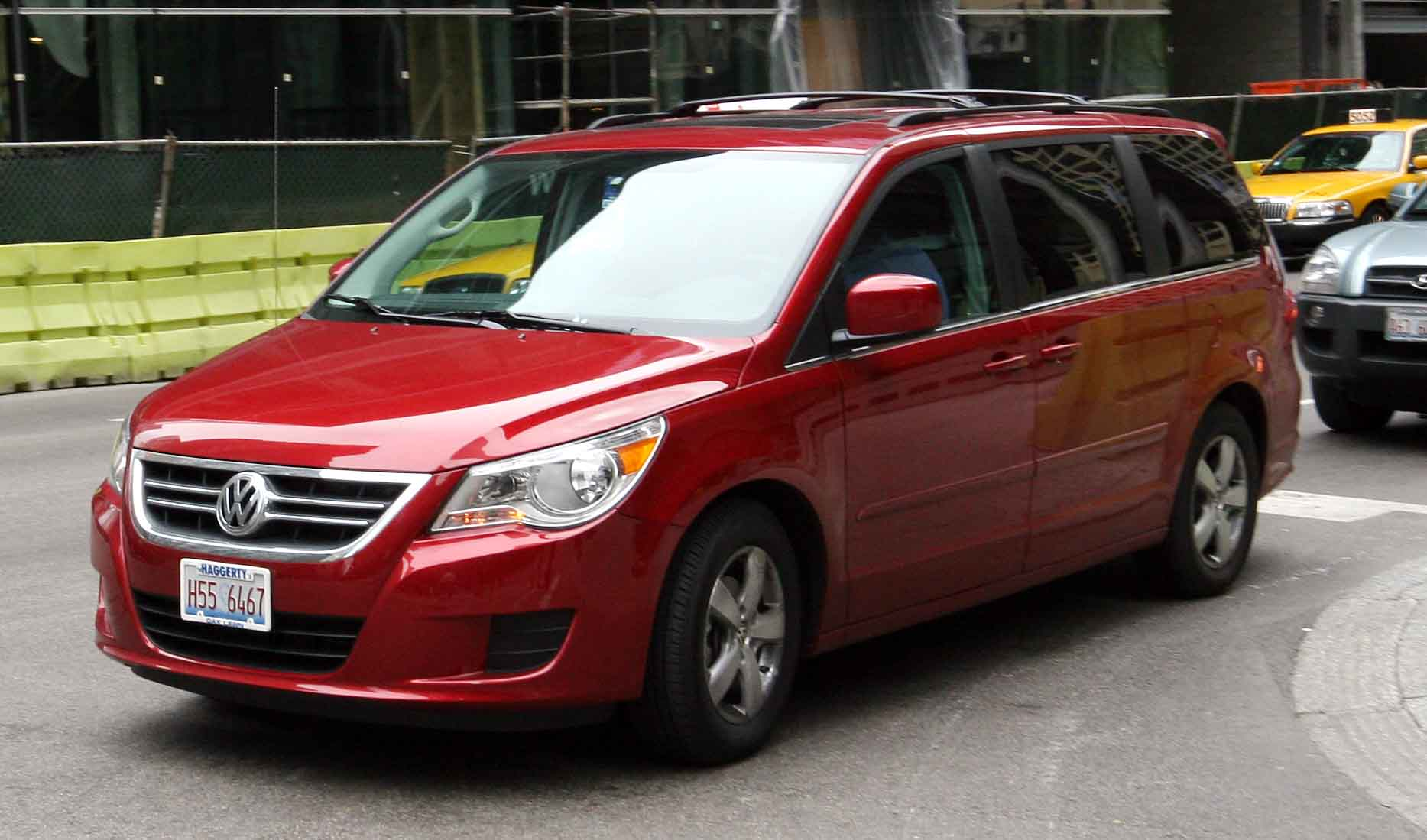
Volkswagen Routan

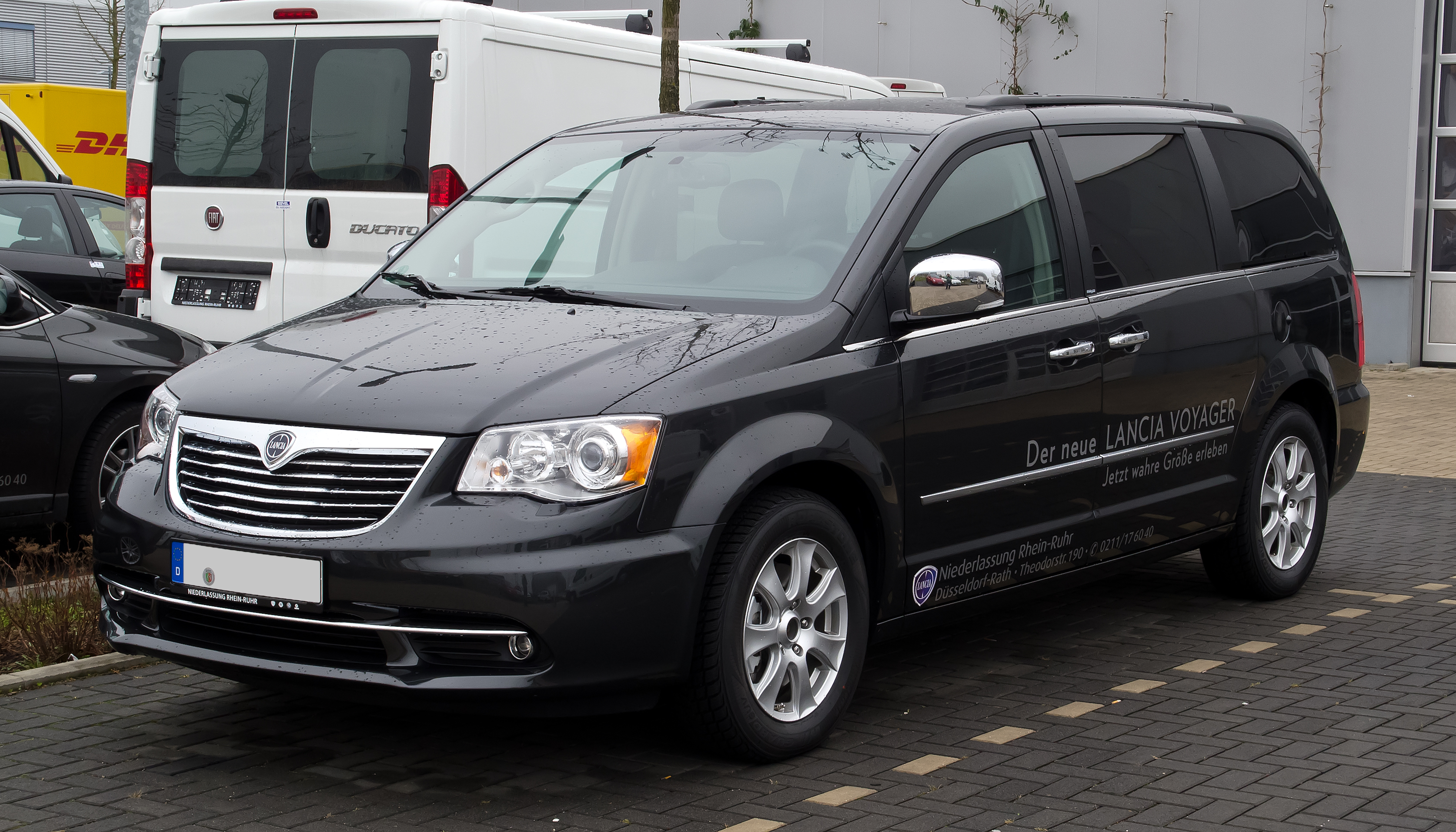
Lancia Voyager

==== China ====
In China, foreign manufacturers were required to form a joint venture with a local manufacturer to manufacture automobiles in the country. Prior to 2022, the Chinese government dictates that no more than two joint ventures are allowed for each foreign investor. Larger foreign manufacturers often set up two joint ventures to maximize the market reach, including Toyota (FAW Toyota and GAC Toyota), Ford (JMC-Ford and Changan Ford), Volkswagen (SAIC-VW and FAW-VW) and Honda (Dongfeng Honda and Guangqi Honda). To distribute the production and sales rights to each joint venture, manufacturers often resort to a similar strategy deployed in Japan: simply producing the exact model under two different names with minor changes to exterior bodywork.

GAC Toyota has produced the Levin as a twin model to the FAW Toyota-built Corolla and the Wildlander as the alternative to the RAV4. Honda awarded several models to two joint ventures, which spawned the Breeze from the original CR-V, the Elysion from the Odyssey, the XR-V from the HR-V, and others.

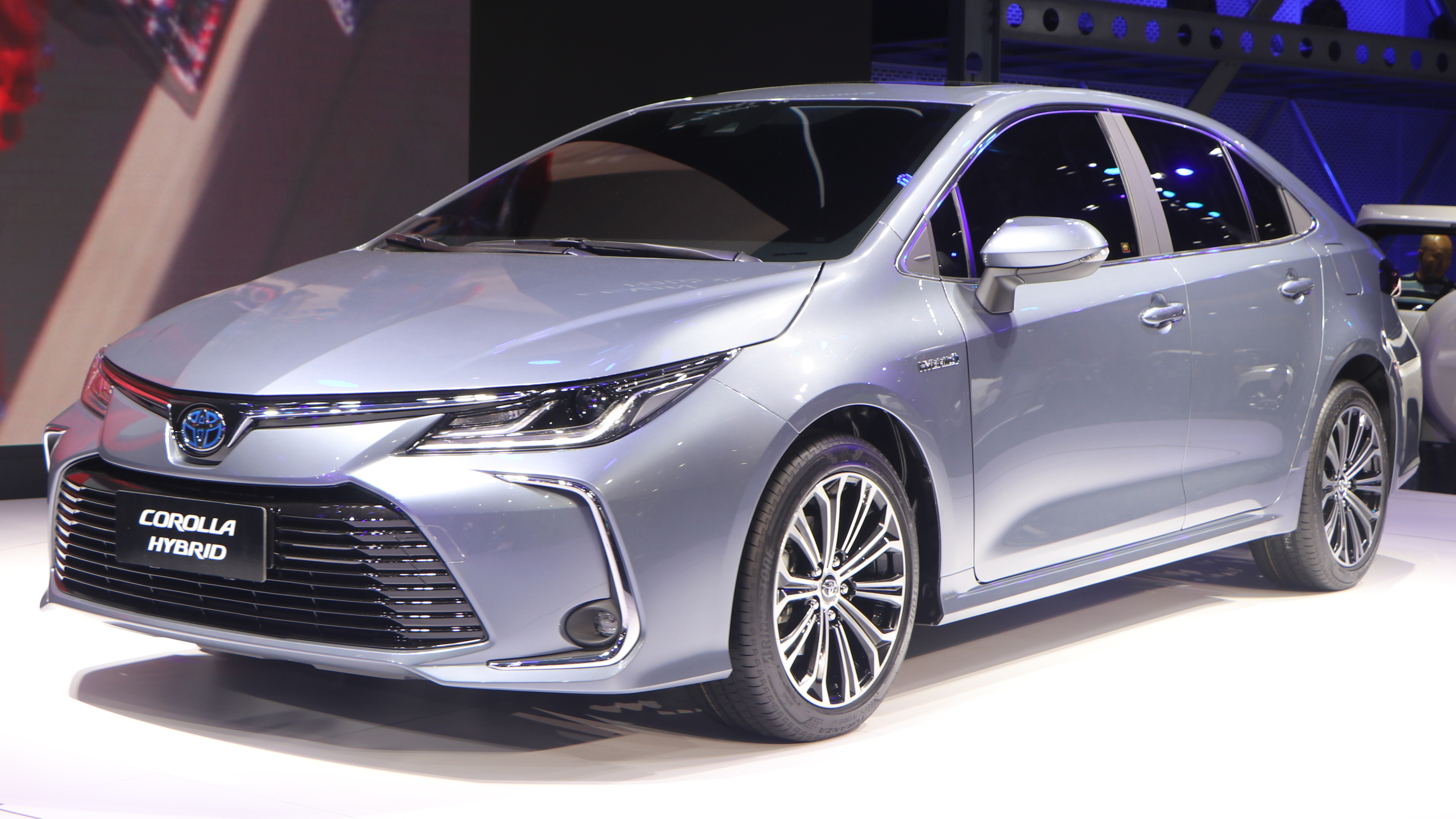
FAW-Toyota Corolla

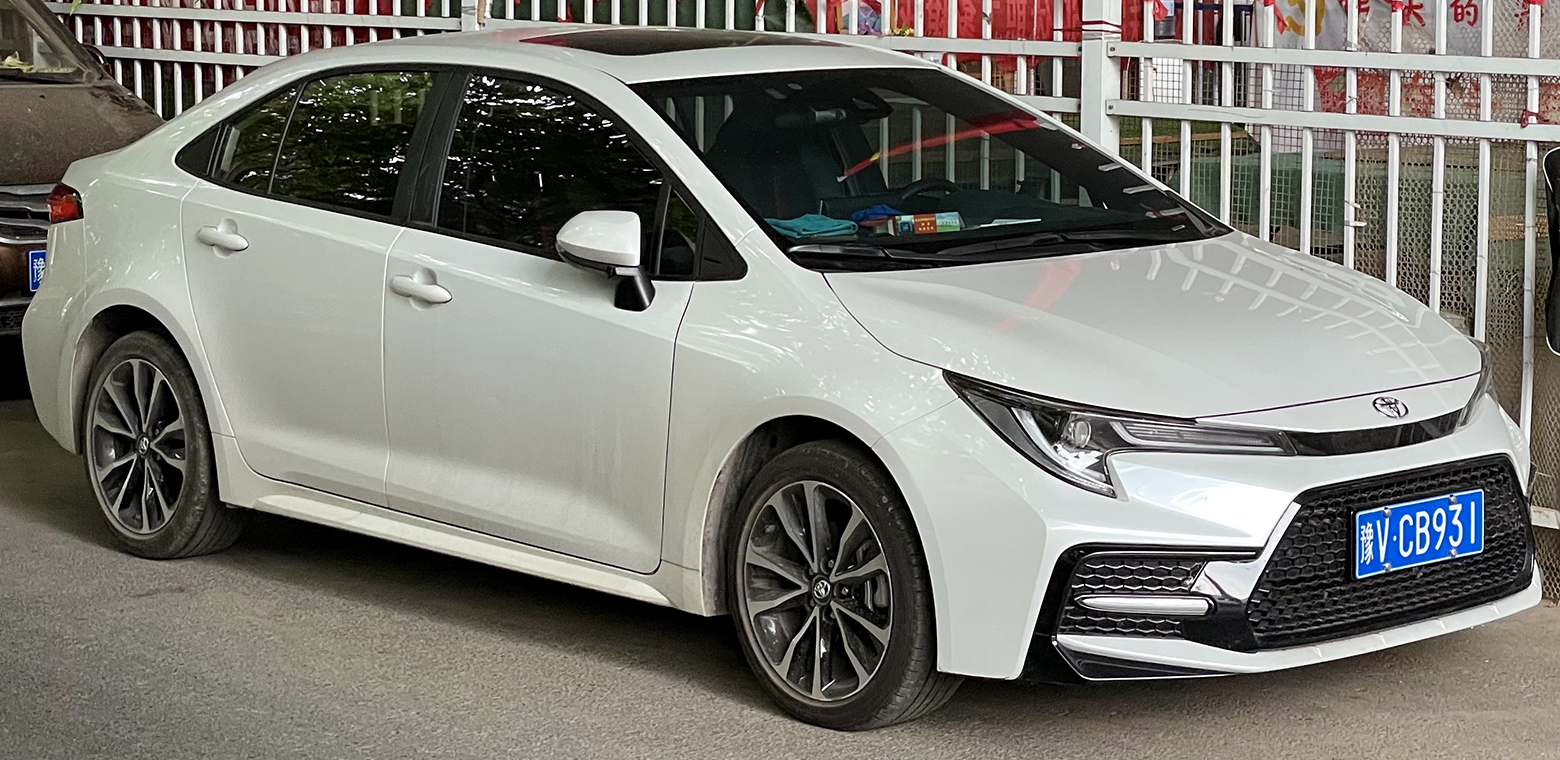
GAC-Toyota Levin

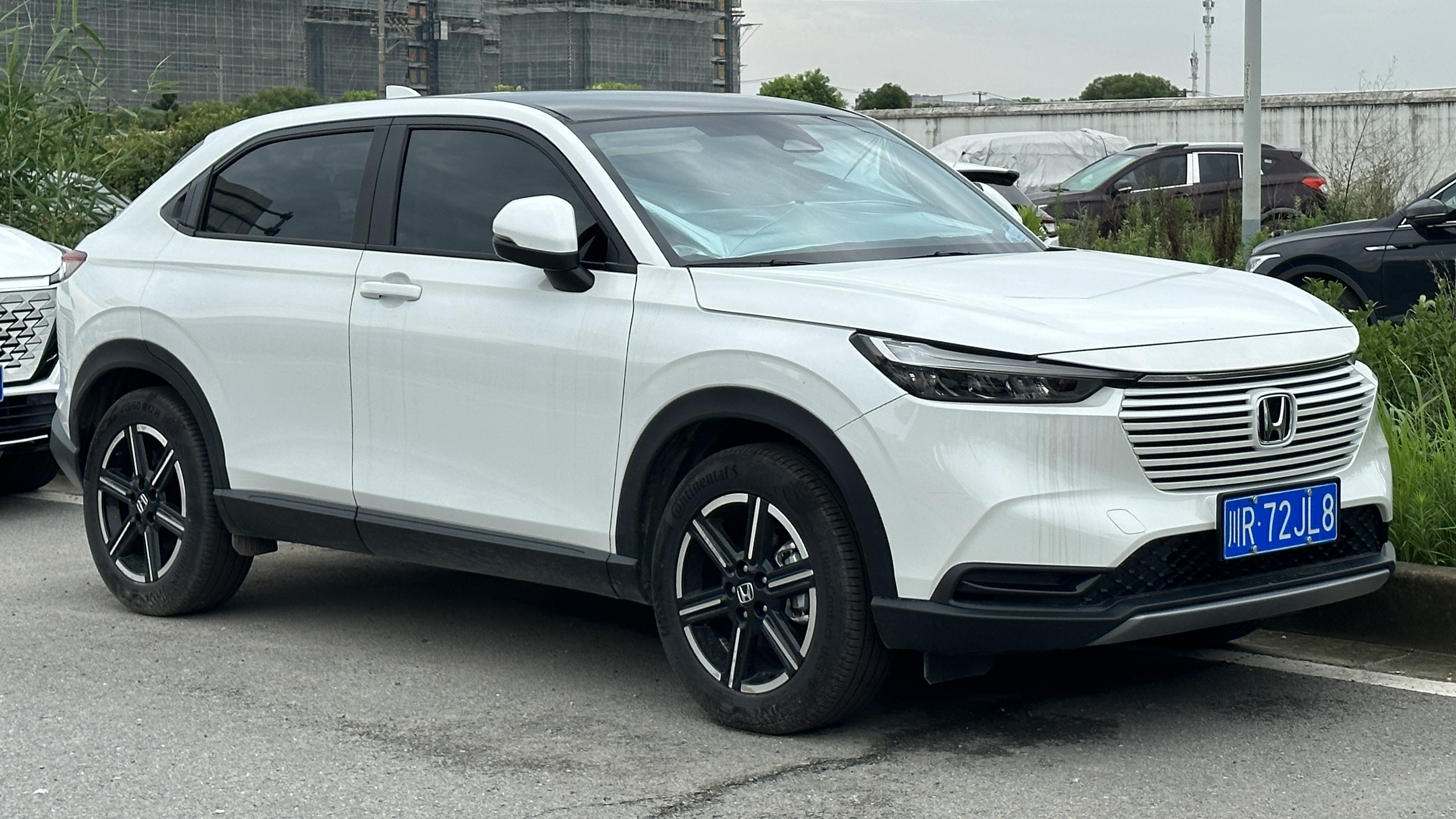
GAC-Honda Vezel

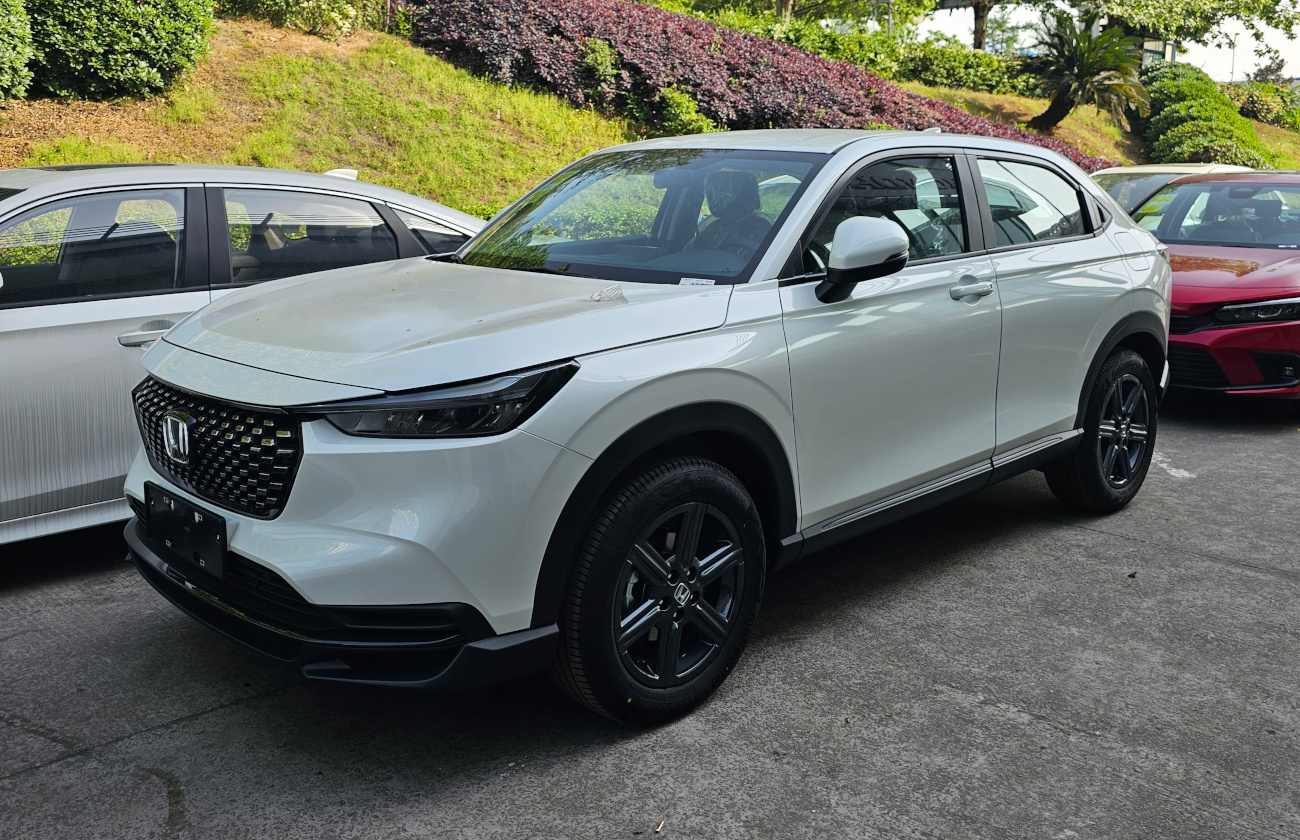
Dongfeng-Honda XR-V

In other cases, foreign manufacturers may also rebadge a model developed by its partner, sometimes for exports to other markets. Examples include the second generation Chevrolet Captiva which is an export version of the Baojun 530 made by SAIC-GM-Wuling, or the Ford Territory, a reworked version of the Yusheng S330 developed by Jiangling Motors (JMC).

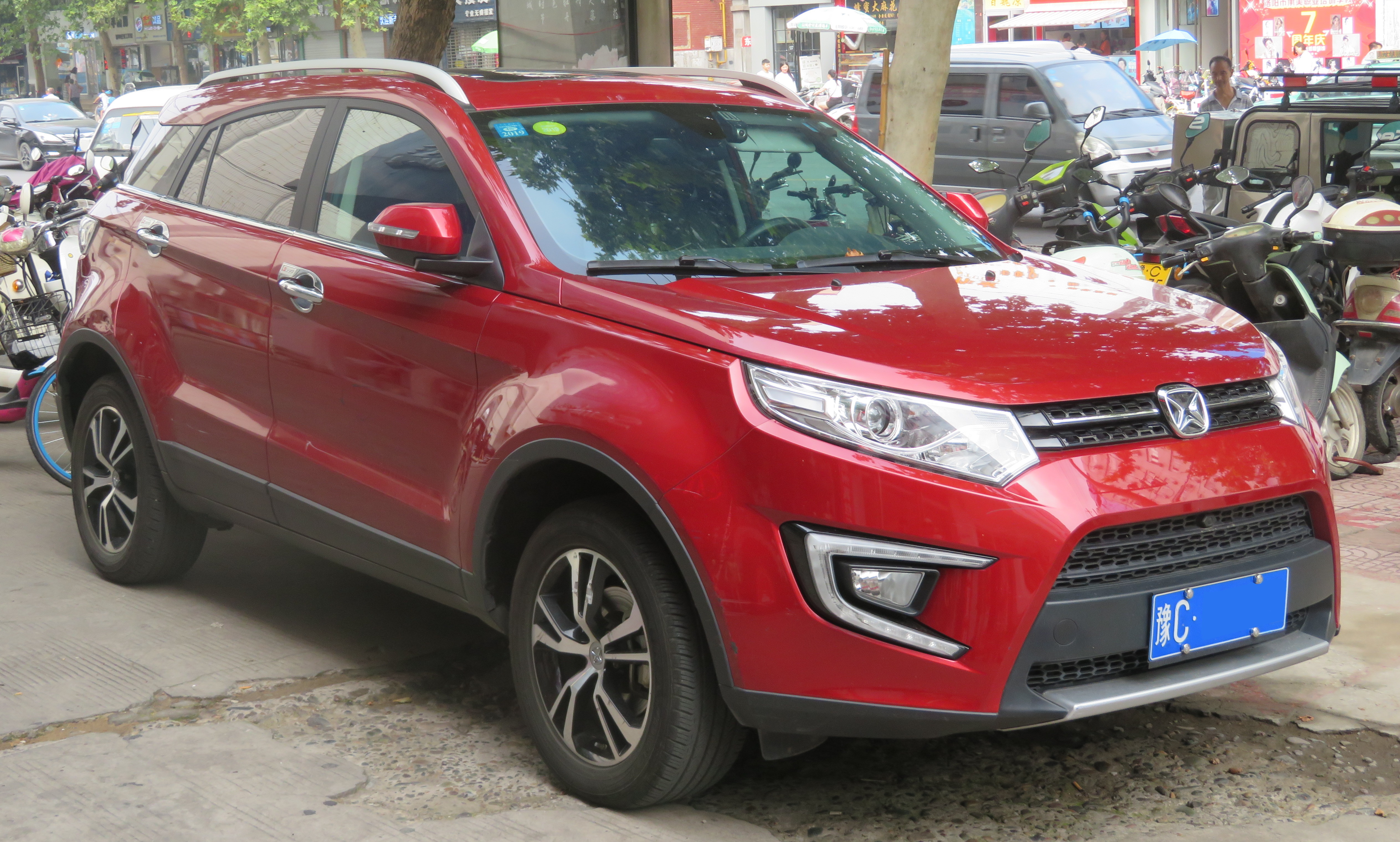
JMC Yusheng S330

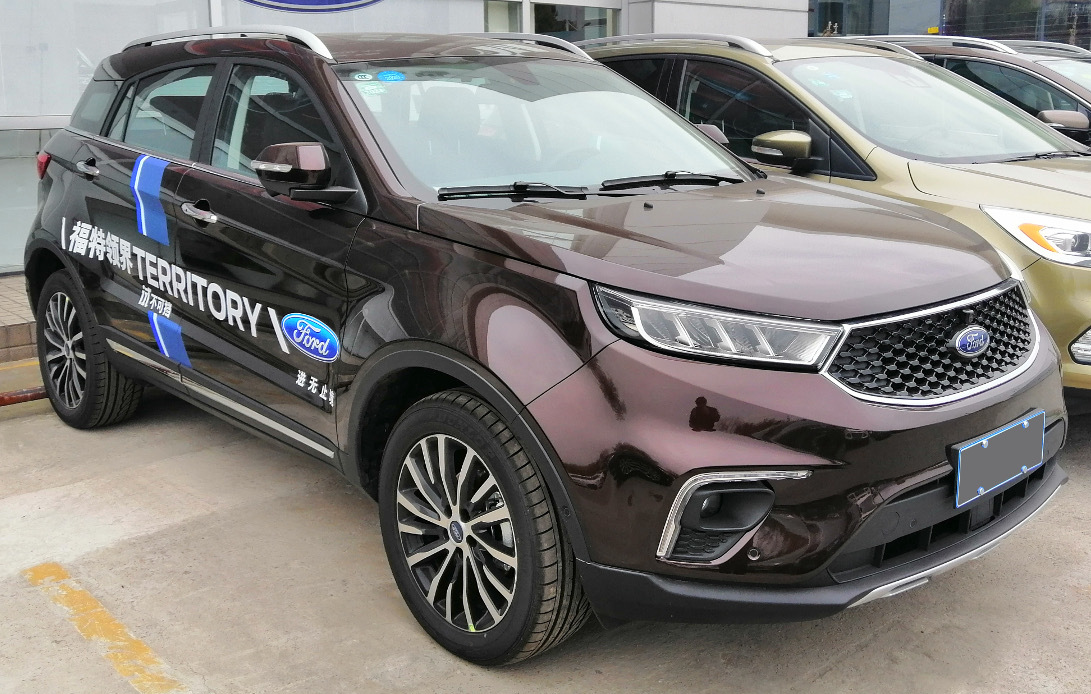
Ford Territory

=== Life cycle extension ===
Badge engineering could be used as a strategy to lengthen the life cycle of a vehicle. After a product has reached the end of its life cycle, it may be transferred to another brand, mostly from the same holding company or joint venture. Examples include the SEAT Exeo, a rebadged Audi A4 B7 with reworked styling, which was built in Spain from used production tooling from the Audi plant in Ingolstadt after the A4 B7 production had ended. The tooling was dismantled from Ingolstadt and was sent to the SEAT manufacturing plant in Martorell, Spain, to be reinstalled.

Another example is the Dongfeng Fengdu MX6, which was produced after the near-identical Nissan X-Trail (T31) production had ended, and the Maruti Suzuki Zen Estilo, which is based on the then-recently discontinued Suzuki MR Wagon. The advantage of this strategy is amortized tooling costs, which means the vehicle can be produced at a higher margin of profit (or a lower price, or both).

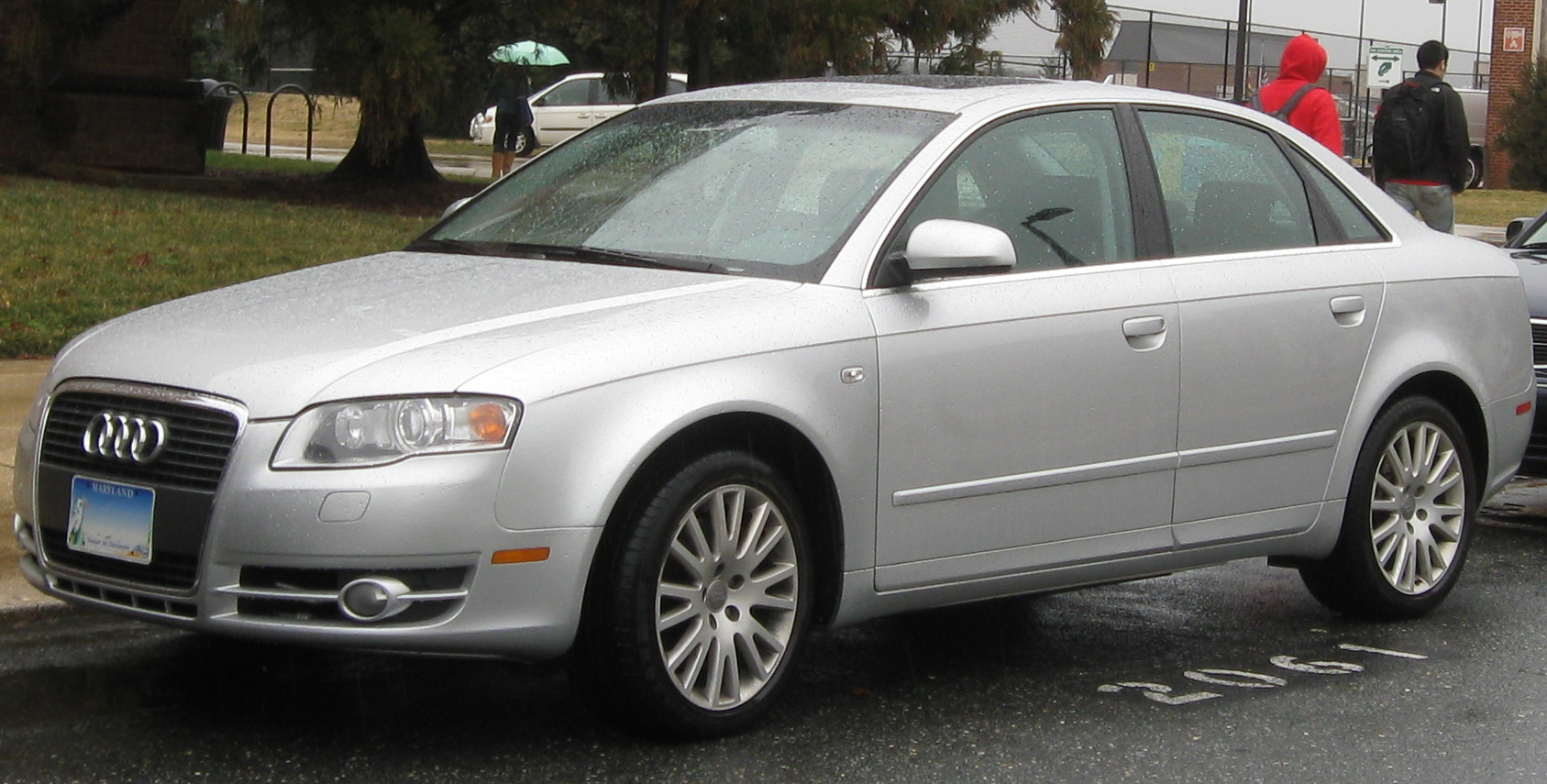
Audi A4 (B7)

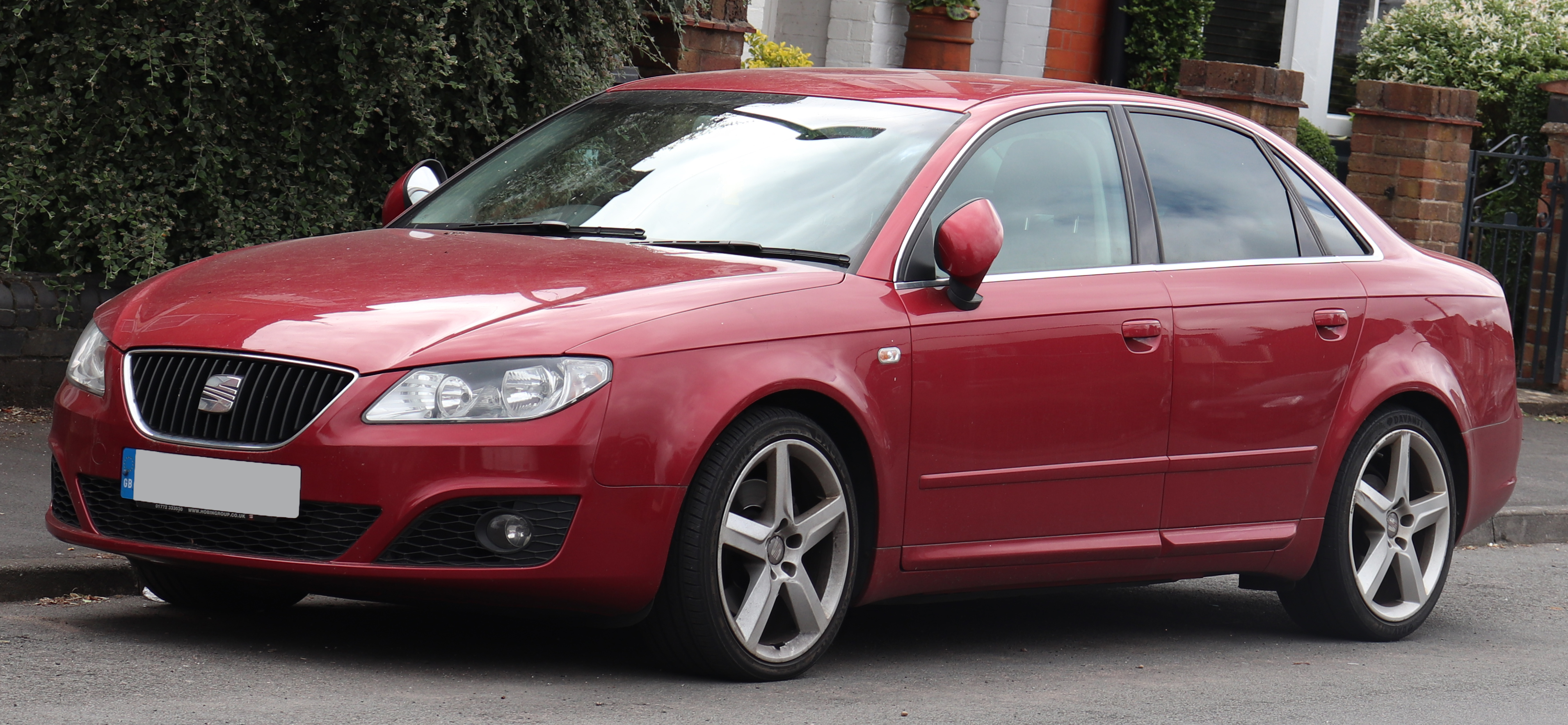
SEAT Exeo

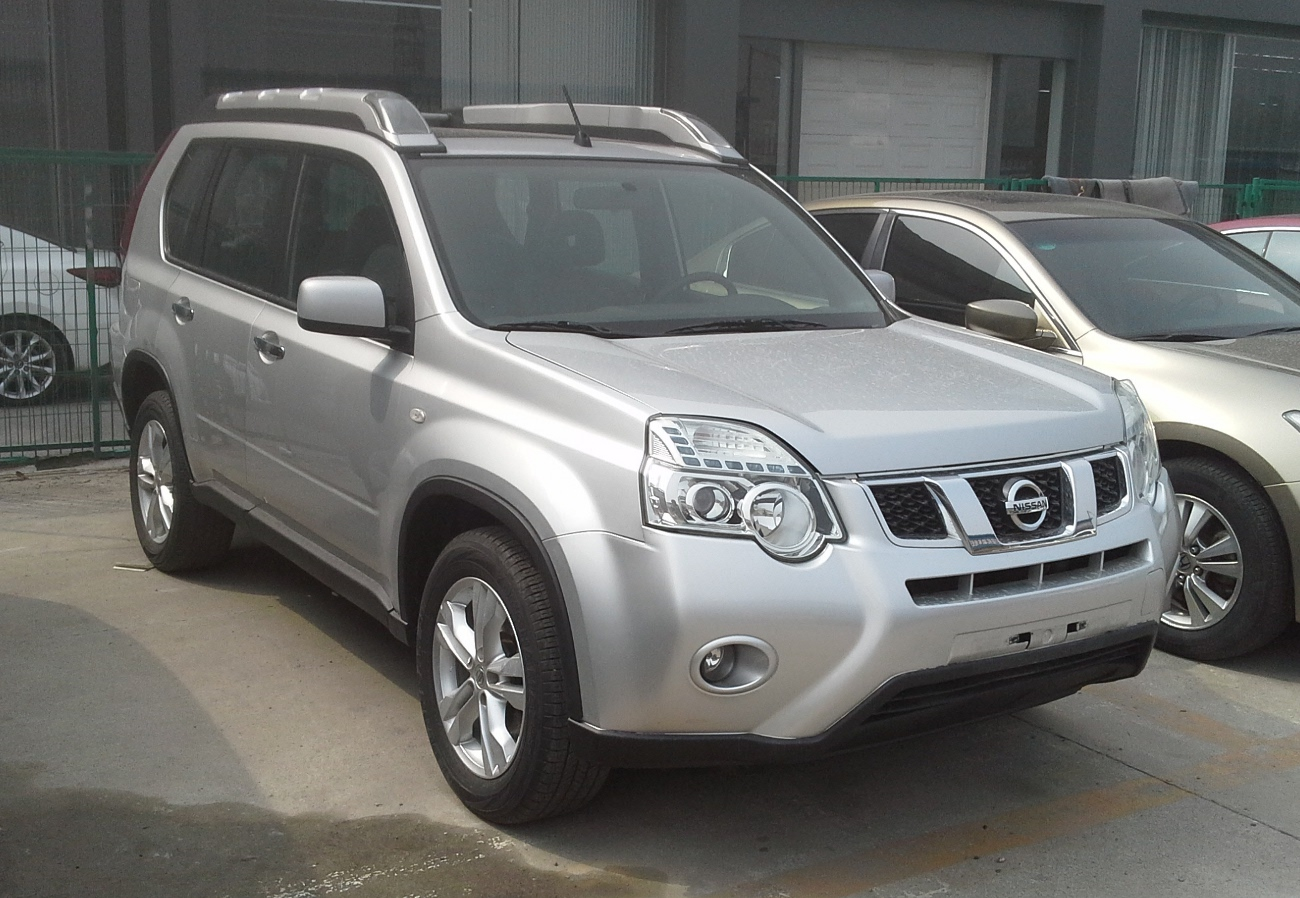
Nissan X-Trail (T31)

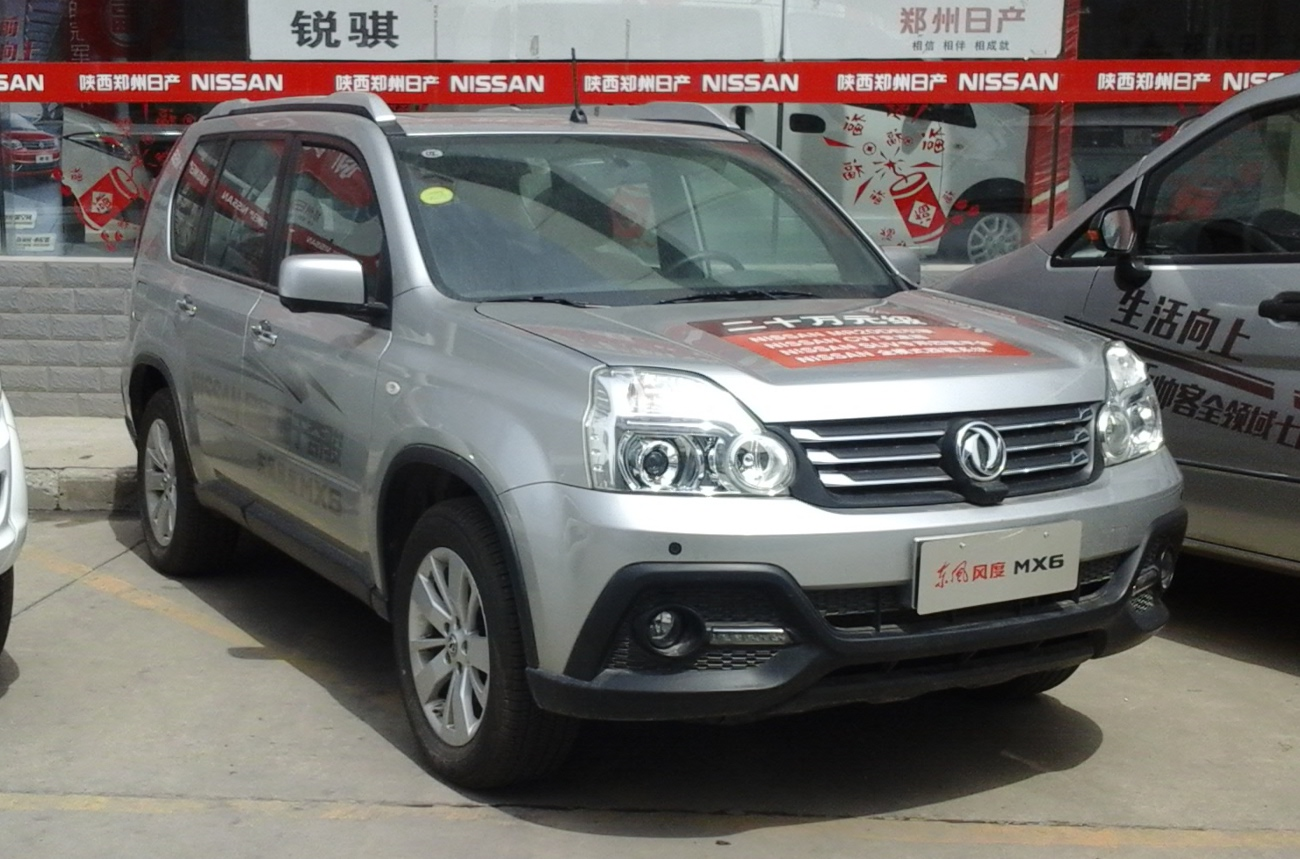
Dongfeng Fengdu MX6

=== Luxury vehicles ===
Badge engineering occurs in the luxury-type market segments. An automobile manufacturer will use a model from its mainstream brand as a basis for a model under a premium marque by upgrading its features, technology, and/or styling. Along with visible cosmetic differences, premium models may also receive upgraded drivetrains.

An example of this is that Ford Motor Company marketed its mainstream Ford Fusion mid-size sedan as the Lincoln MKZ; the Ford Expedition SUV is sold as the Lincoln Navigator. A more controversial example was the Aston Martin Cygnet, a rebadged version of the Toyota iQ city car (intended to comply with EU emissions regulations). While fitted with model-specific trim and a luggage set, the Cygnet nearly tripled the price of the iQ. Alternatively, VW Group under Ferdinand Piëch used the reverse of this in some circumstances, engineering the more luxurious model first and then removing features for models from less prestigious marques. Examples include the Lamborghini Gallardo/Audi R8 and the Audi A4/Volkswagen Passat.

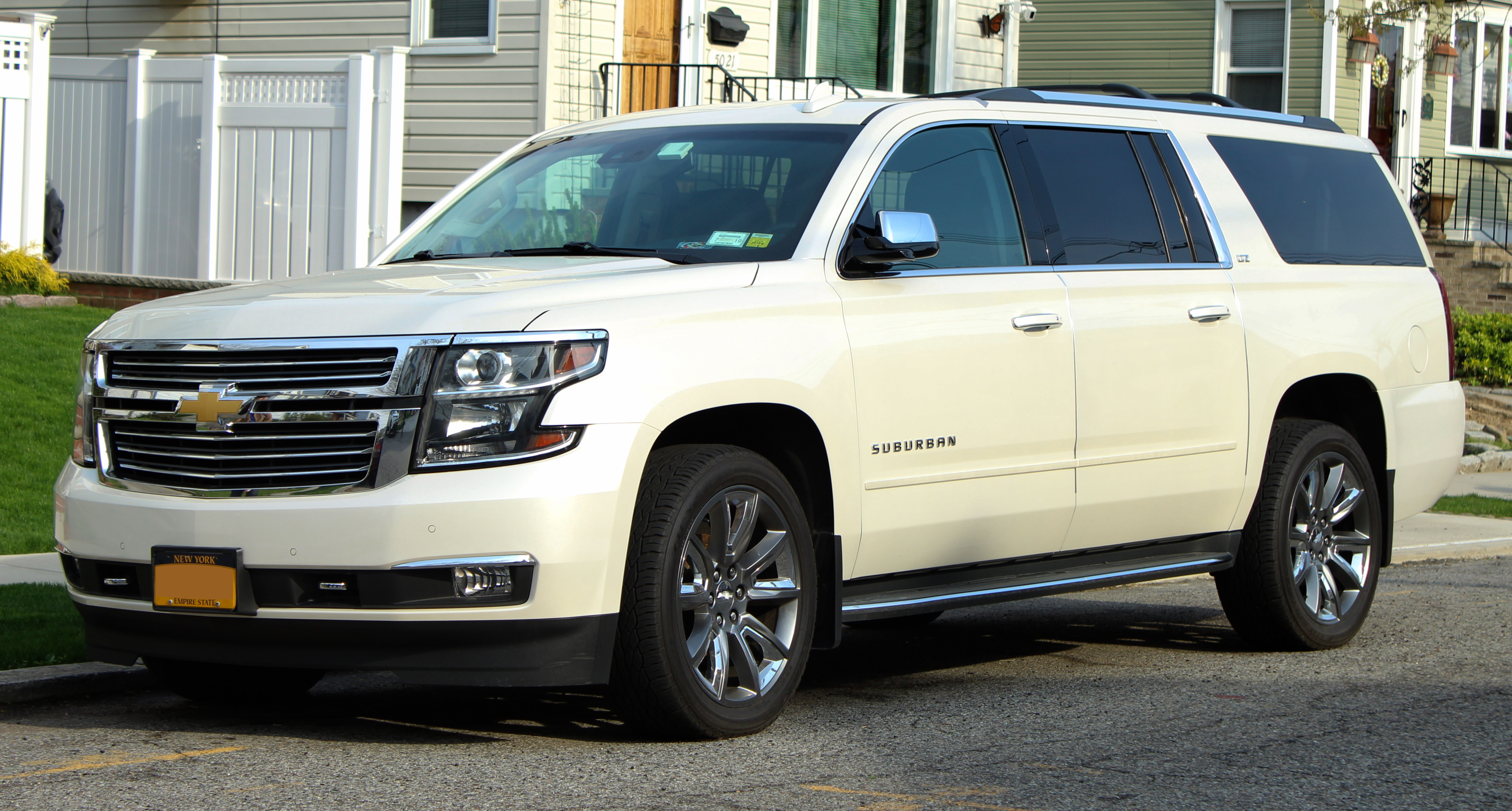
Chevrolet Suburban

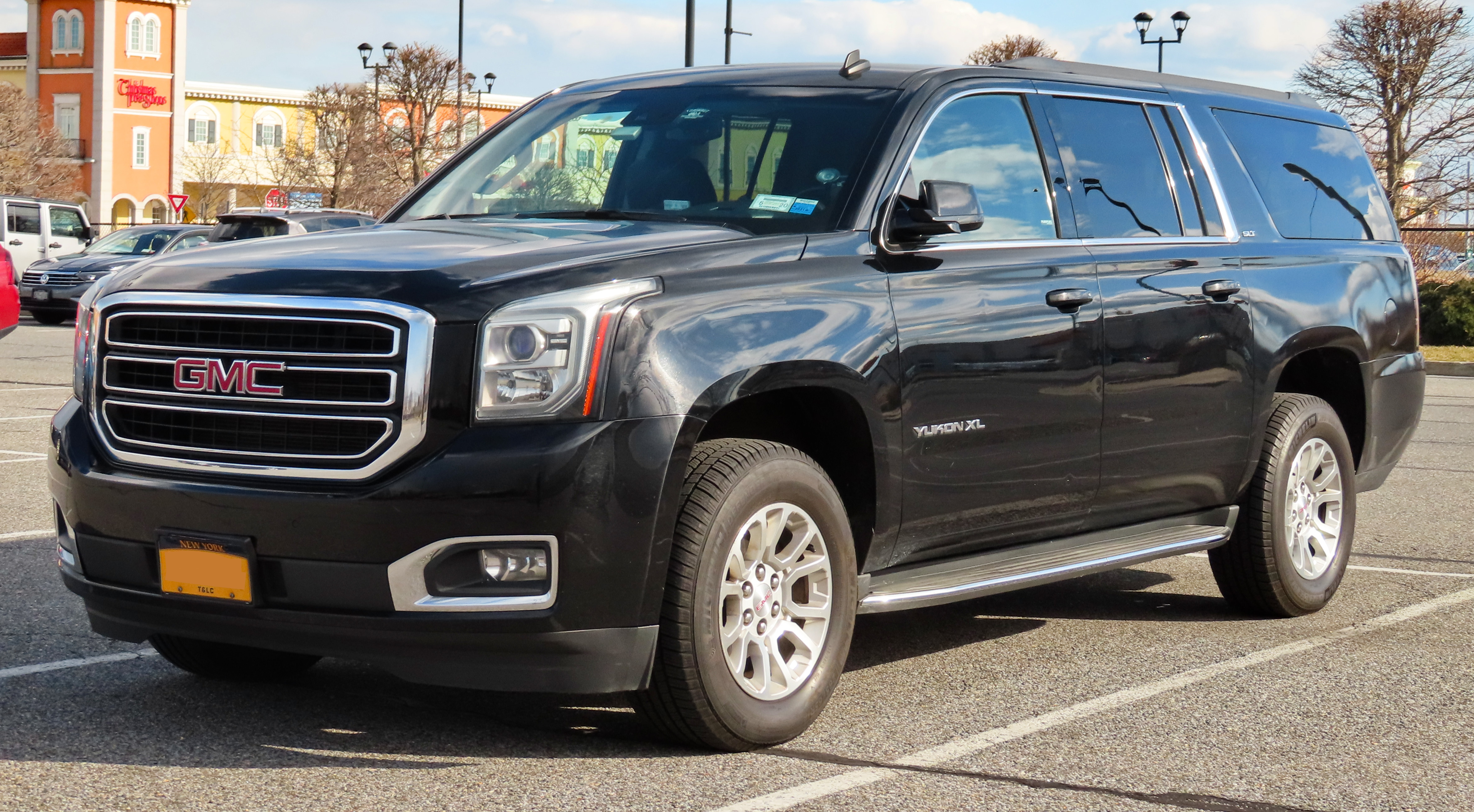
GMC Yukon XL

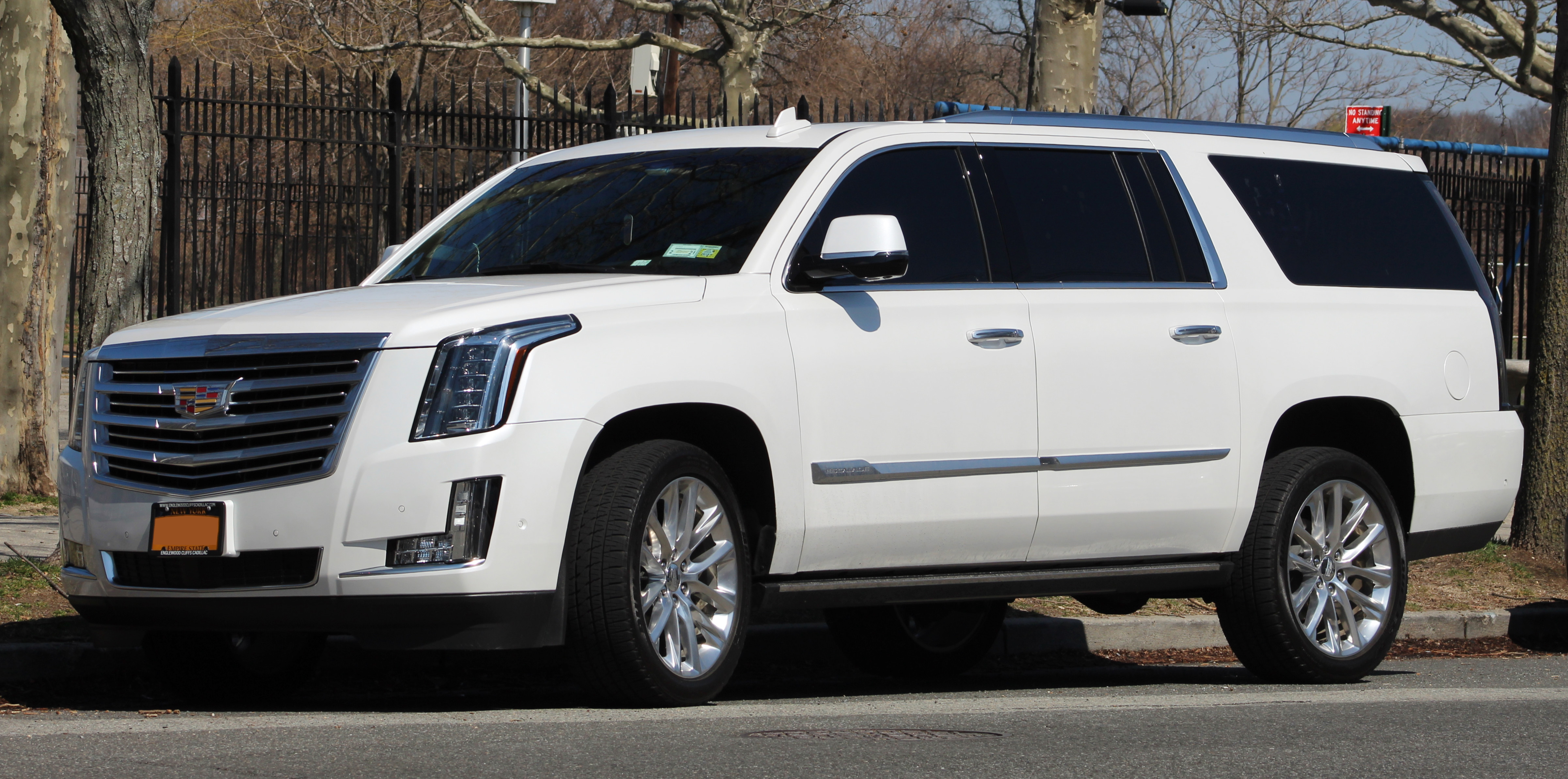
Cadillac Escalade ESV

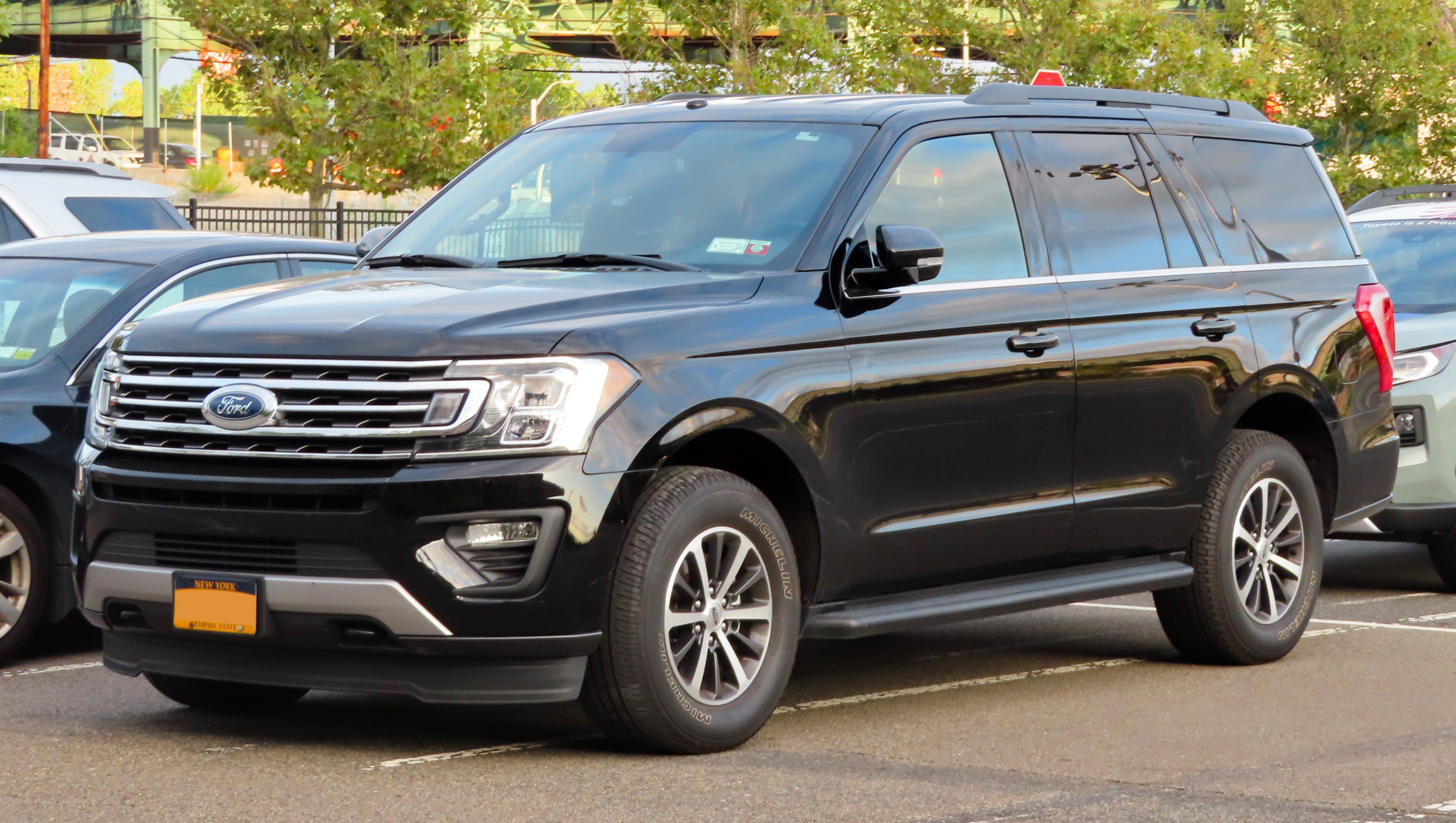
Ford Expedition

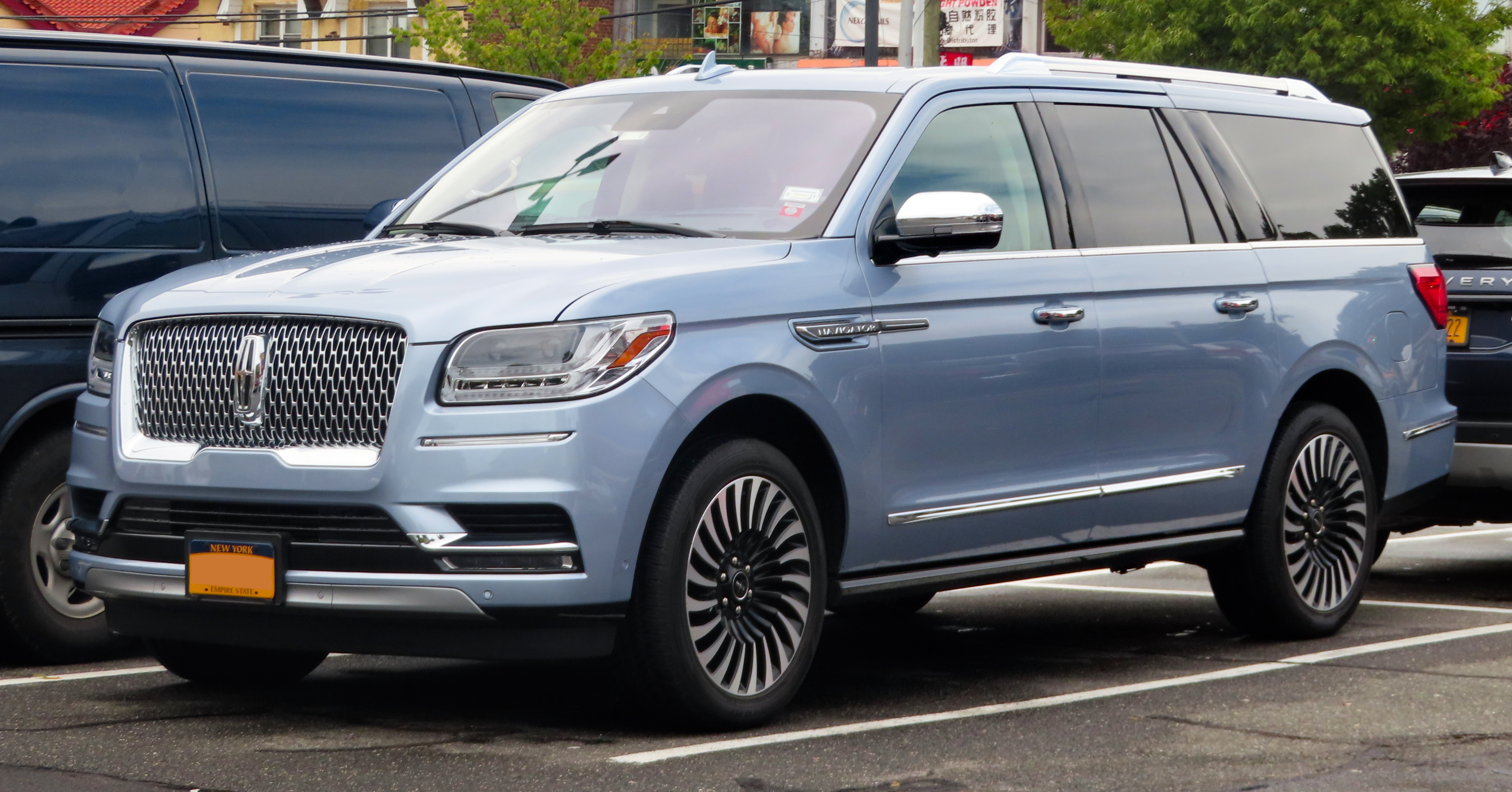
Lincoln Navigator L Black Label

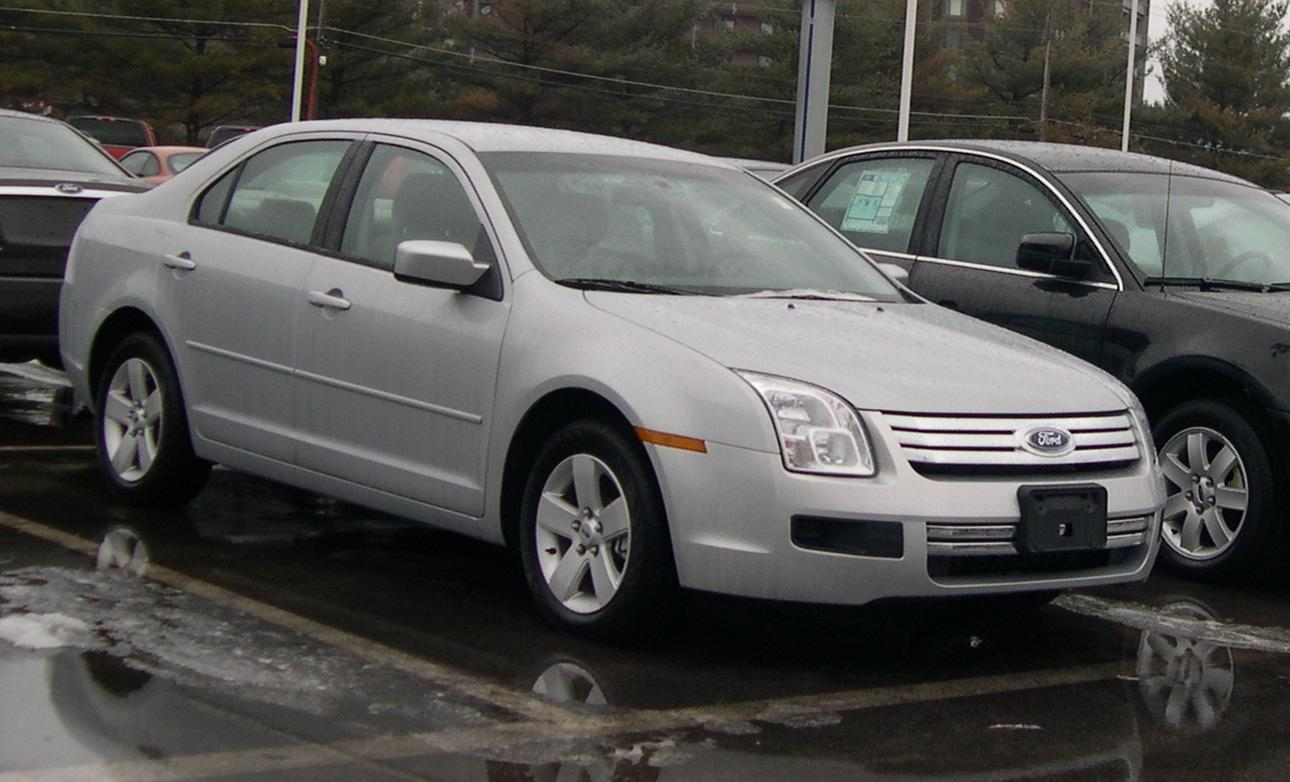
Ford Fusion

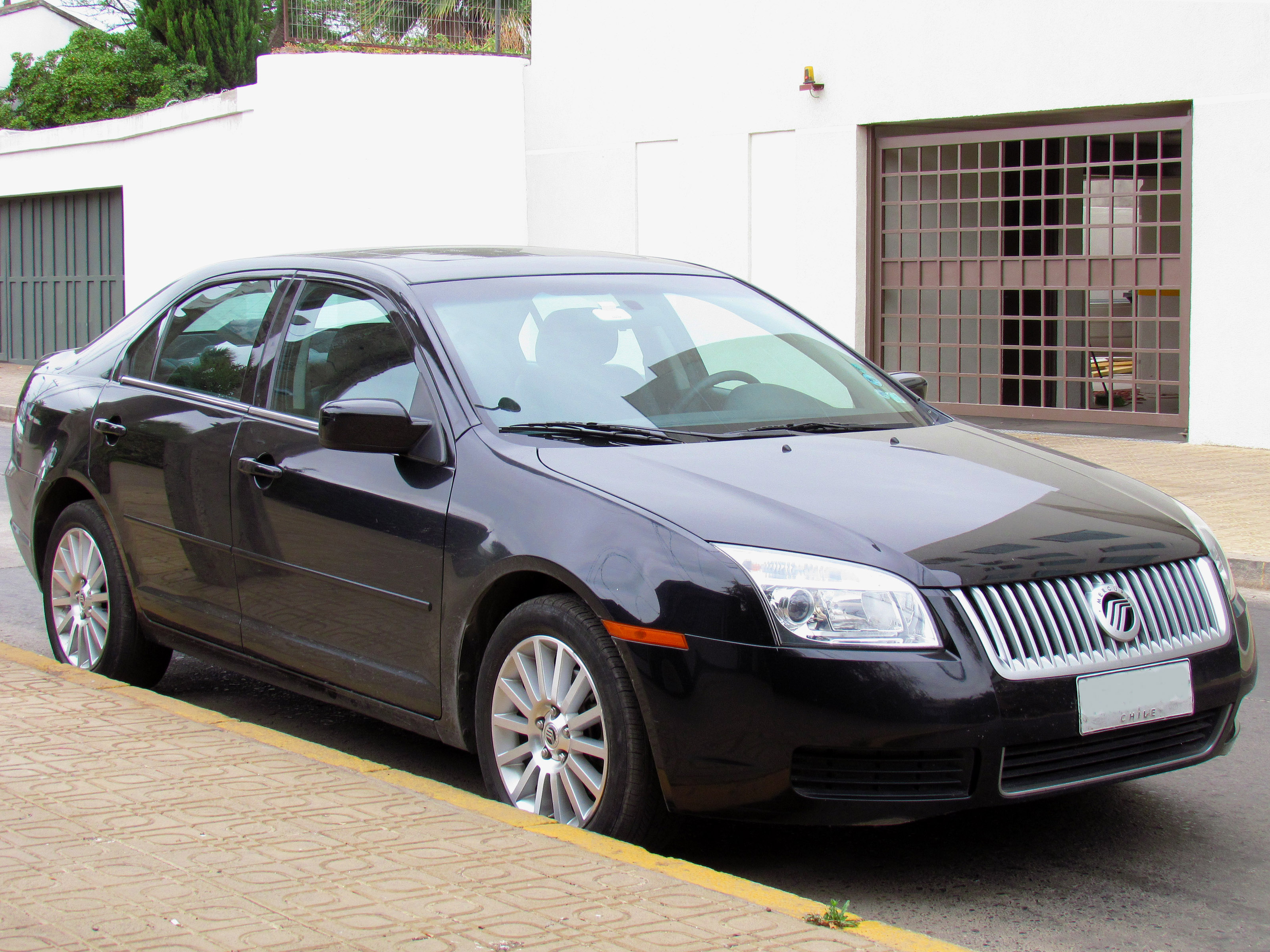
Mercury Milan

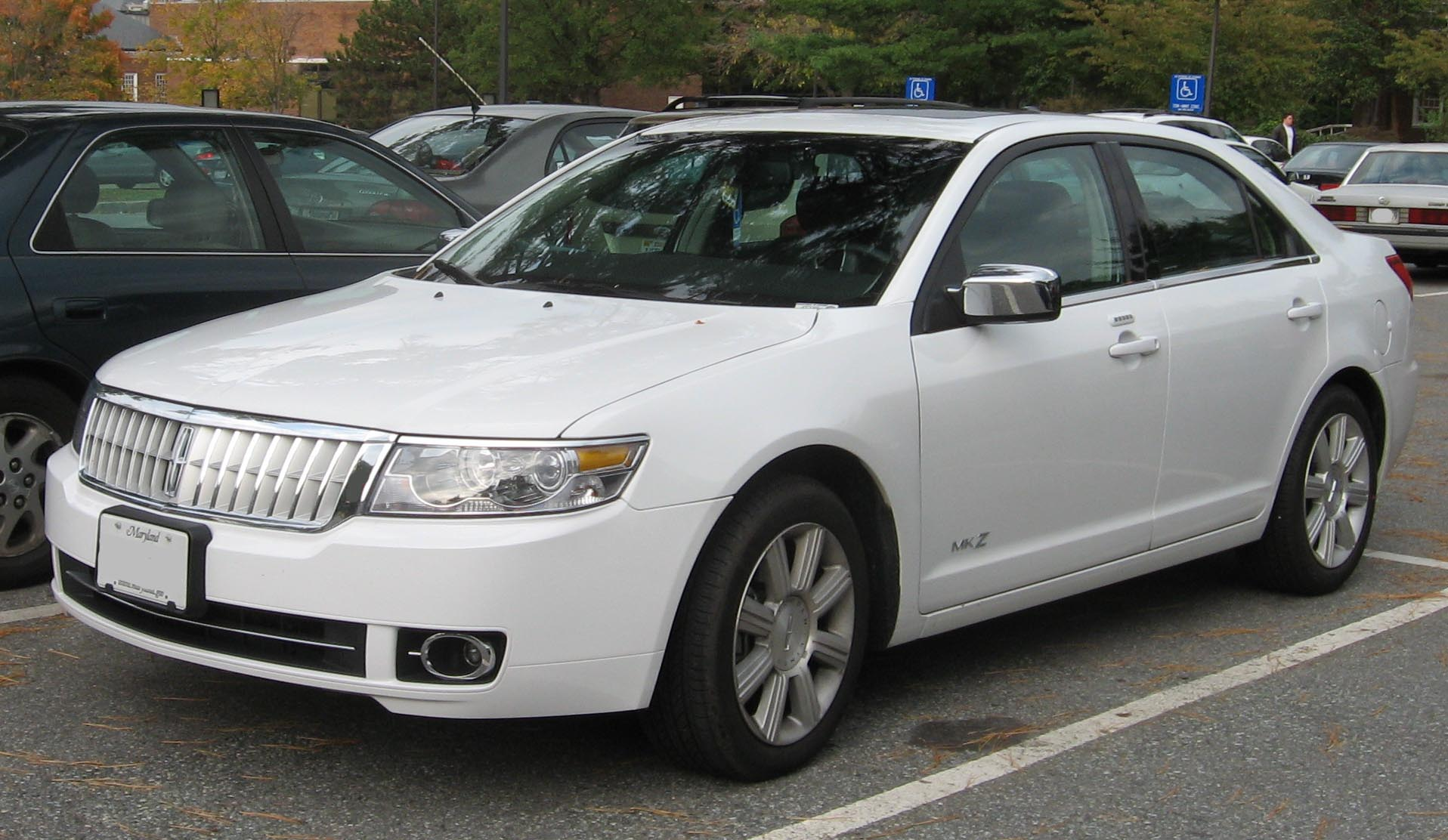
Lincoln MKZ (Zephyr)

=== Platform sharing ===
Along with rebadging and badge engineering, platform sharing is common throughout the automotive industry. Alongside a shared chassis (though unibody construction is nearly universal in cars and many light trucks), platform sharing also standardizes components such as drivetrain, suspensions, components, and other technologies. General Motors used the B platform for many of its non-Cadillac full-size vehicles (nearly exclusively from 1959 through 1985), while Chrysler used its B platform for intermediates and its C platform for (non-Imperial) full-size cars.

The Volkswagen Group uses platform sharing as its business strategy to improve its profitability and growth. For example, Audi uses components from their more pedestrian counterparts, sold as Volkswagen mass-market brands. As an effort to place Audi as a "premium" marque, Volkswagen often introduces new technologies in Audi-branded cars before fitting them to mainstream products (such as the Direct-Shift Gearbox). In production, platform sharing is used extensively, with the modular MQB platform underpinning a range of vehicles from the Audi A1 to the Volkswagen Atlas. The previous D platform of the 2000s was used for the Volkswagen Phaeton and Bentley Continental GT (built in steel) and the Audi A8 (built in aluminum).

In the Japanese automotive industry, platform sharing has expanded model offerings in North America. While the initial Lexus LS was developed specifically for the American market, the later Lexus ES has shared a platform (but not a body) with the Toyota Camry (since 2013, the Toyota Avalon, itself also based on the Camry). Exclusive primarily to North America, Honda uses a common platform to produce the American version of the Odyssey minivan, also underpinning the Honda Pilot and Honda Passport SUVs, the Acura MDX CUV, and the Honda Ridgeline mid-size pickup truck.

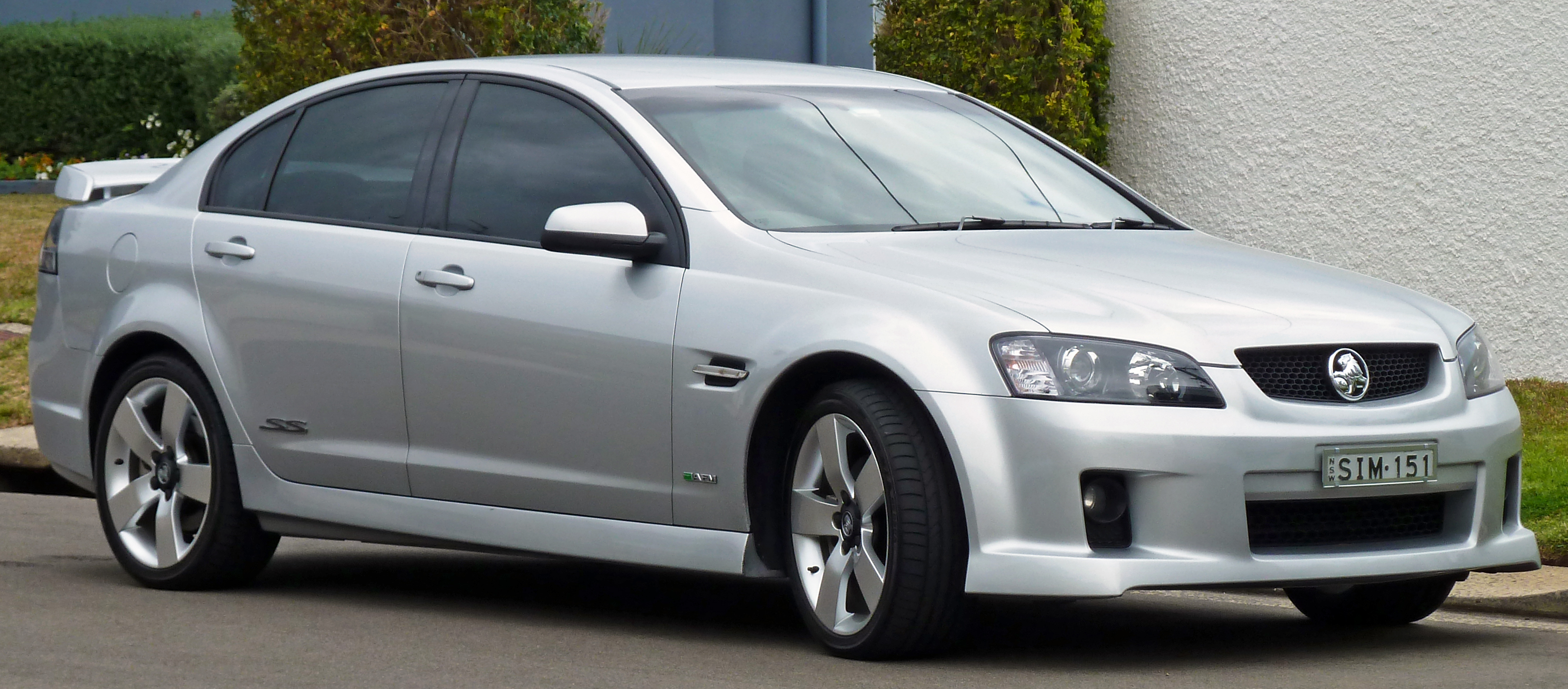
Holden Commodore (VE)

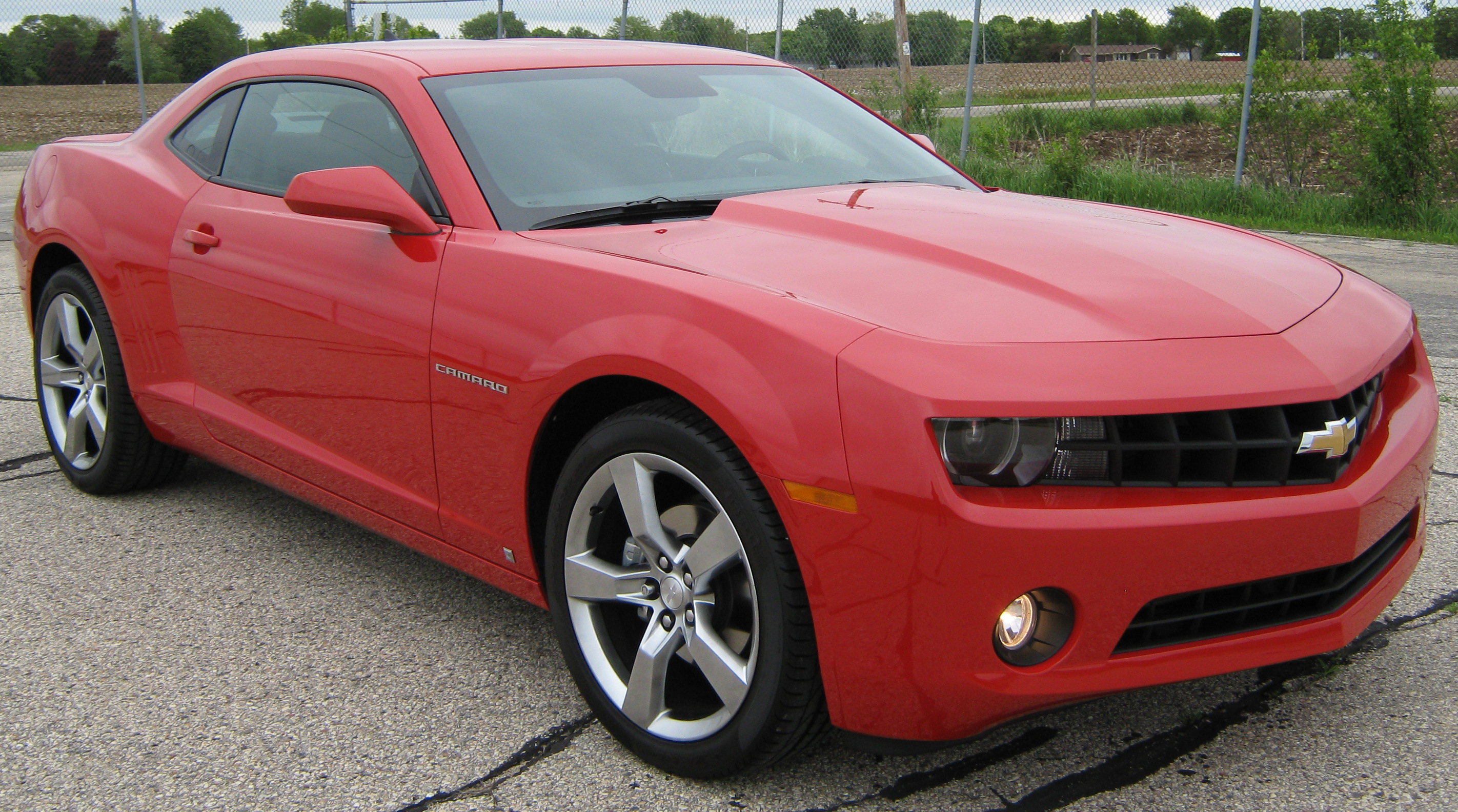
Chevrolet Camaro (fifth generation)

The Fifth generation Chevrolet Camaro was based on the Holden developed General Motors Zeta platform, originally used by the VE series Holden Commodore.

== Problems and controversy ==
Although rebadging is intended to save development costs by spreading design and research expenses across several vehicles, it can become problematic if not implemented properly. Utilizing multiple car brands under a single parent manufacturer can significantly increase selling costs, as each model line must be marketed separately, necessitating a distinct dealership network. Inappropriate use of rebadging can also negatively impact overall sales by causing "cannibalism" between two or more brands owned by the same company. This can occur when there is a failure to develop a distinct image for each brand or when the failure of one version of a model adversely affects its rebadged counterparts.

Through the 2000s, the American Big Three automakers reduced their brand footprint by closing or selling underperforming brands. After 2001, Chrysler discontinued its Plymouth brand (following the closure of Eagle in 1998). In response to the late 2000s recession, Ford ended its ownership of Jaguar, Land Rover, Aston Martin, and Volvo Cars; in 2010, Mercury was closed by Ford. General Motors underwent several brand revisions; following the discontinuation of the Geo sub-brand of Chevrolet in 1997, Oldsmobile was closed after 2004 (the oldest American nameplate at the time). Following its 2009 bankruptcy, GM closed Pontiac, Saturn, and Hummer in 2010; Saab was sold (eventually leading to its demise). GM sold its European Opel and Vauxhall brands in 2017 to PSA (now Stellantis).

=== GM X/H platform compacts ===
In response to the 1973 oil crisis, General Motors expanded fuel-efficient offerings beyond its Chevrolet division, reintroducing compact cars to its Buick, Oldsmobile, and Pontiac brands. Derived from the X-platform Chevrolet Nova, the Pontiac Ventura was introduced for the 1971 model year, with the Buick Apollo and Oldsmobile Omega introduced for 1973. These four X-platform vehicles (also known as N-O-V-A from the first letters of their model names) were produced with identical bodies with divisional differences marked only with specific grille, lamp, and body trim variations.

To expand its footprint in the subcompact segment, the H-body Chevrolet Vega platform was used for the 1975 model year for newly styled variants sold as the Chevrolet Monza, Buick Skyhawk, and Oldsmobile Starfire followed by the 1976 Pontiac Sunbird. Similarly, to the X-body vehicles, the H-body subcompacts shared common bodies across all four divisions with differing grille, lamp, and body trim variations.

1971–1979 GM X-body (compact)

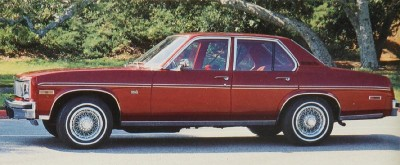
1978 Chevrolet Nova

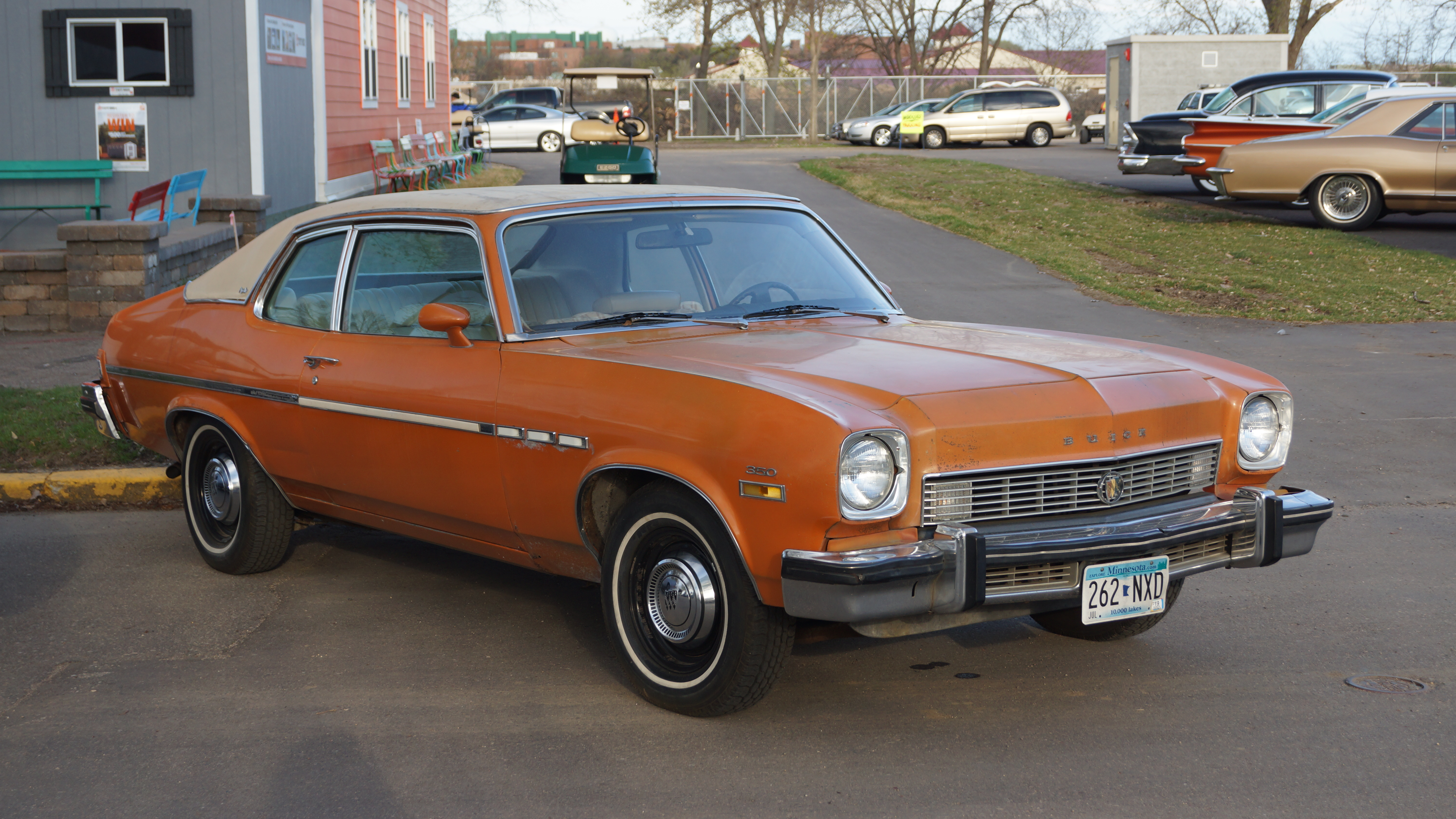
1973 Buick Apollo

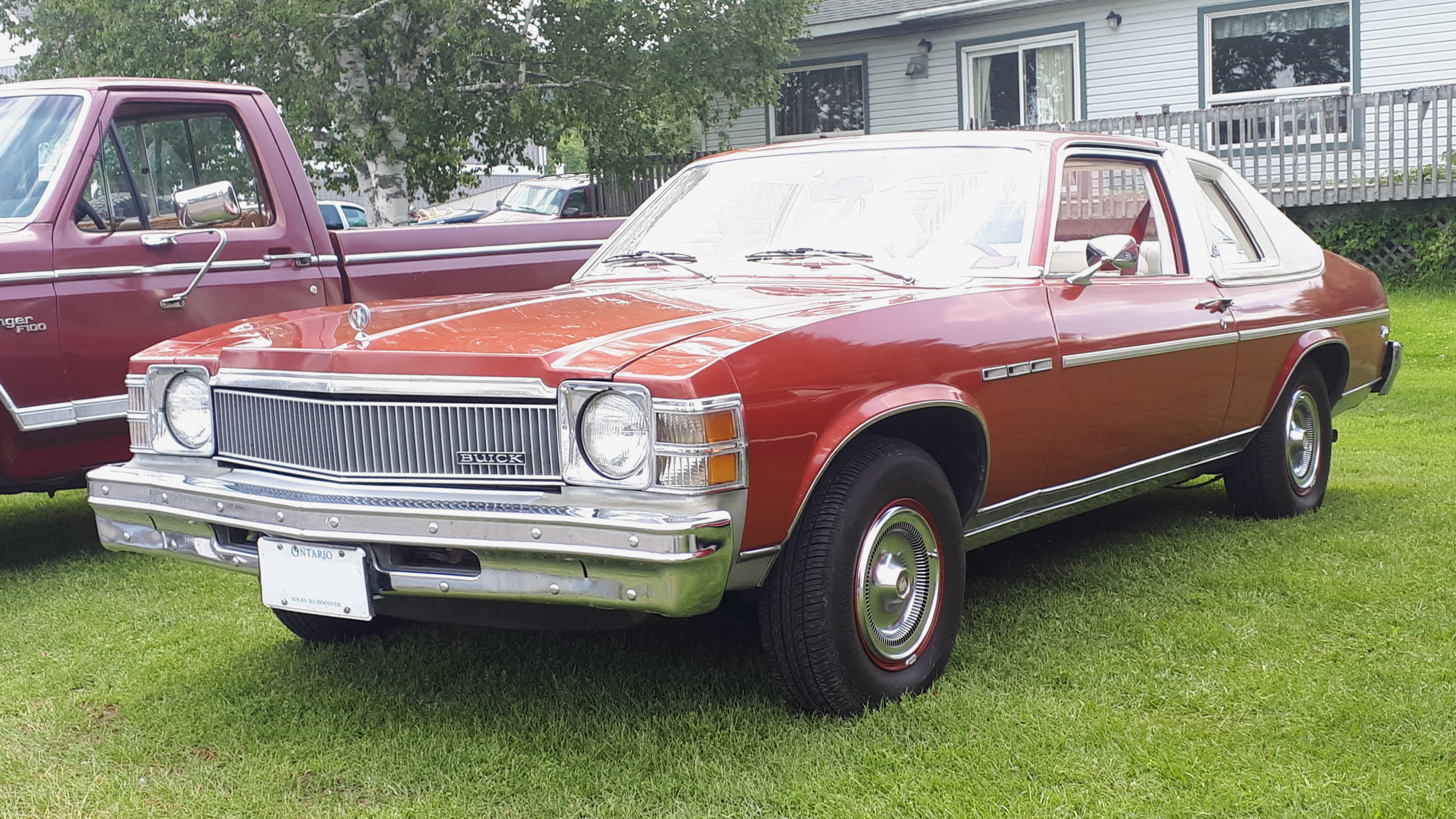
1979 Buick Skylark

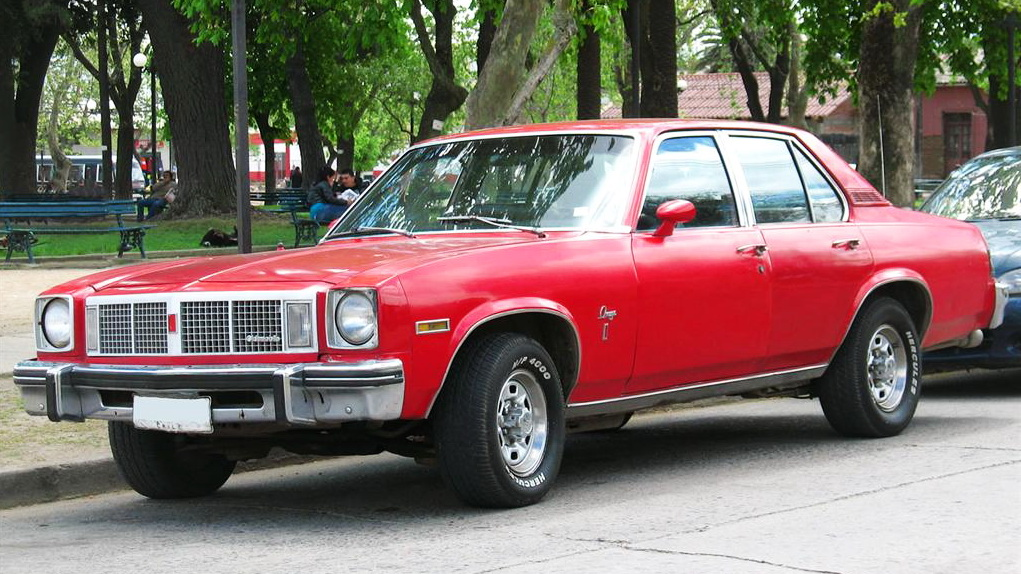
1978 Oldsmobile Omega

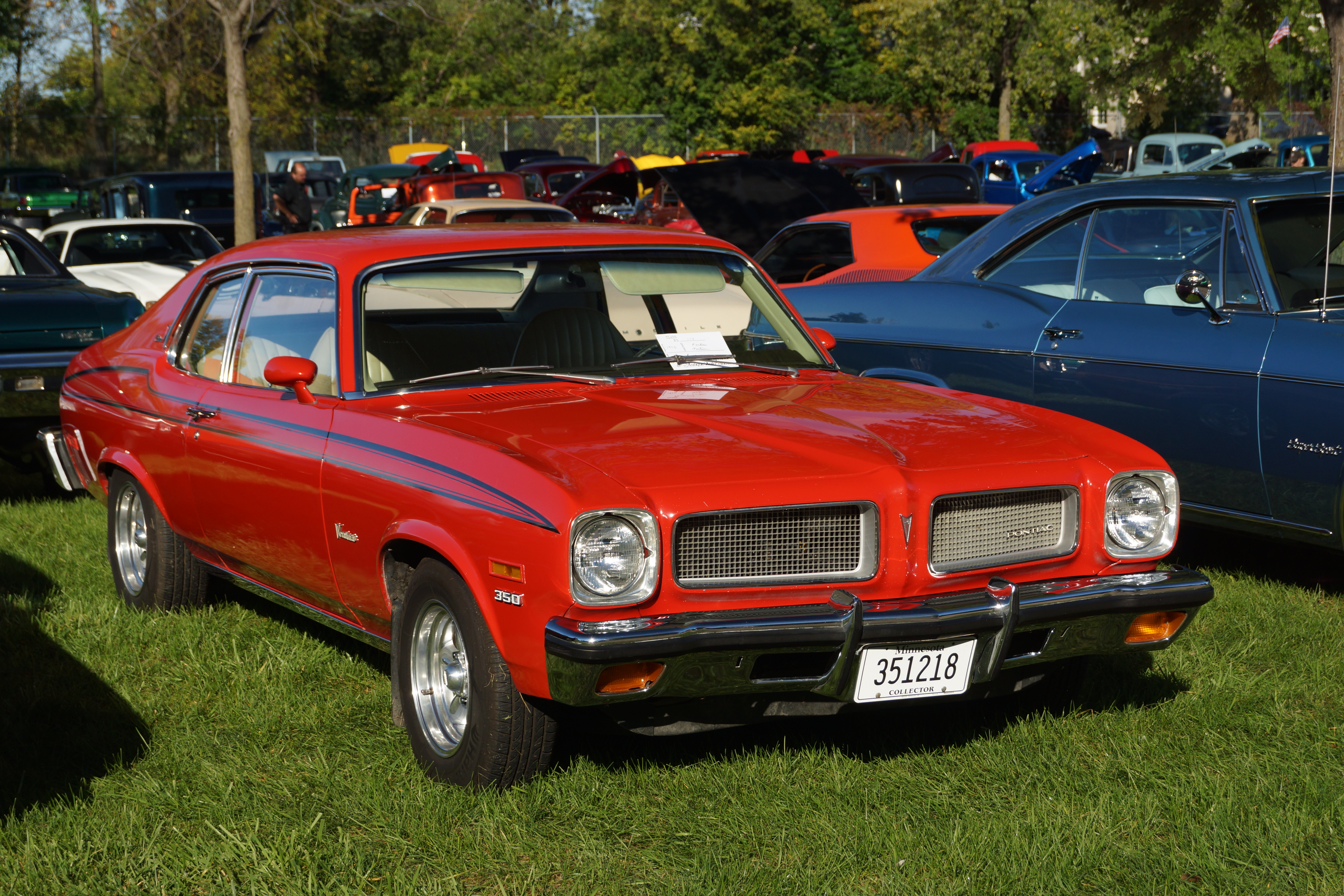
1973 Pontiac Ventura

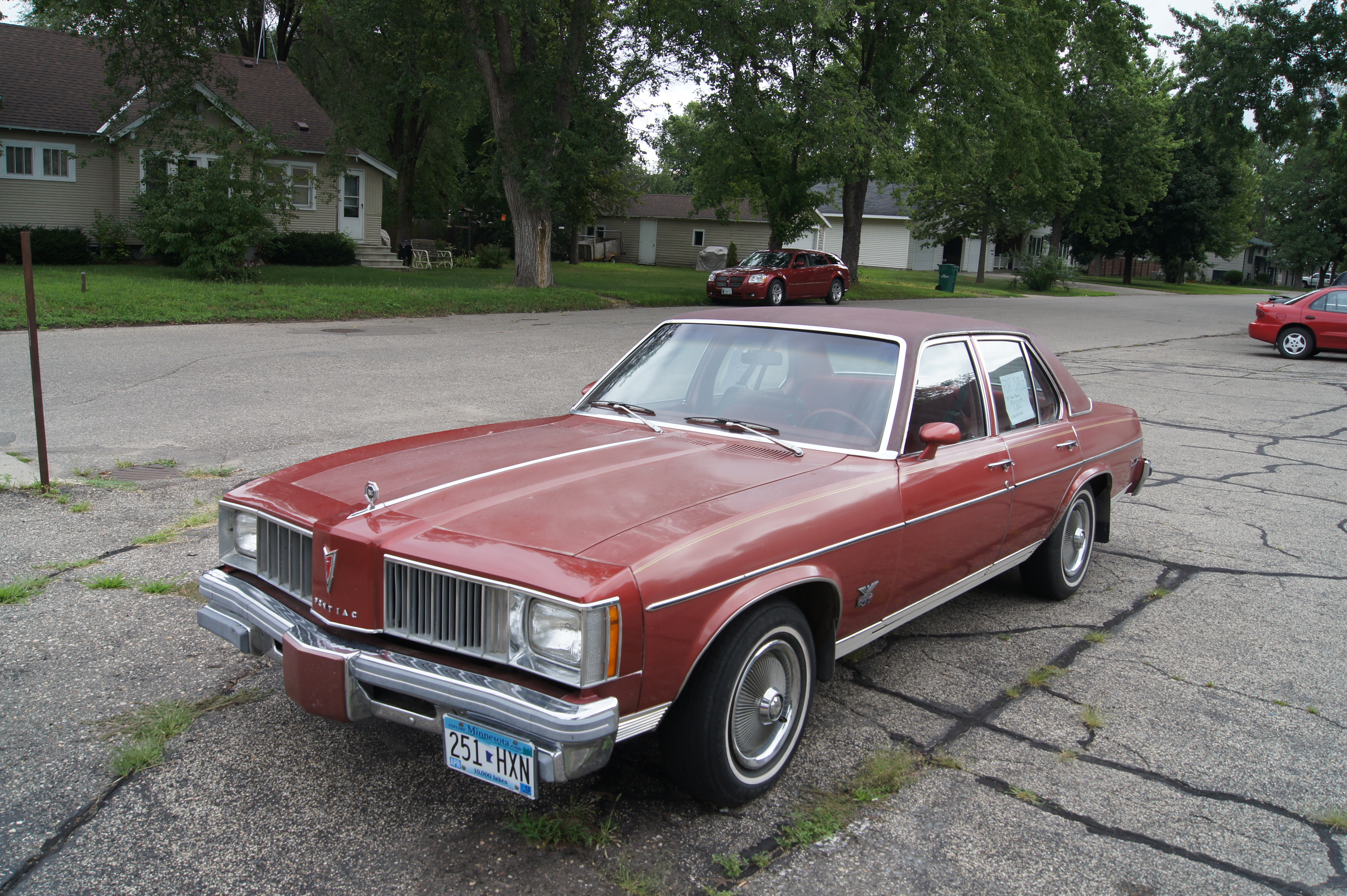
1977 Pontiac Phoenix
1975–1980 GM H-body (subcompact)

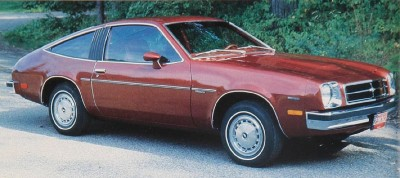
1978 Chevrolet Monza (hatchback)

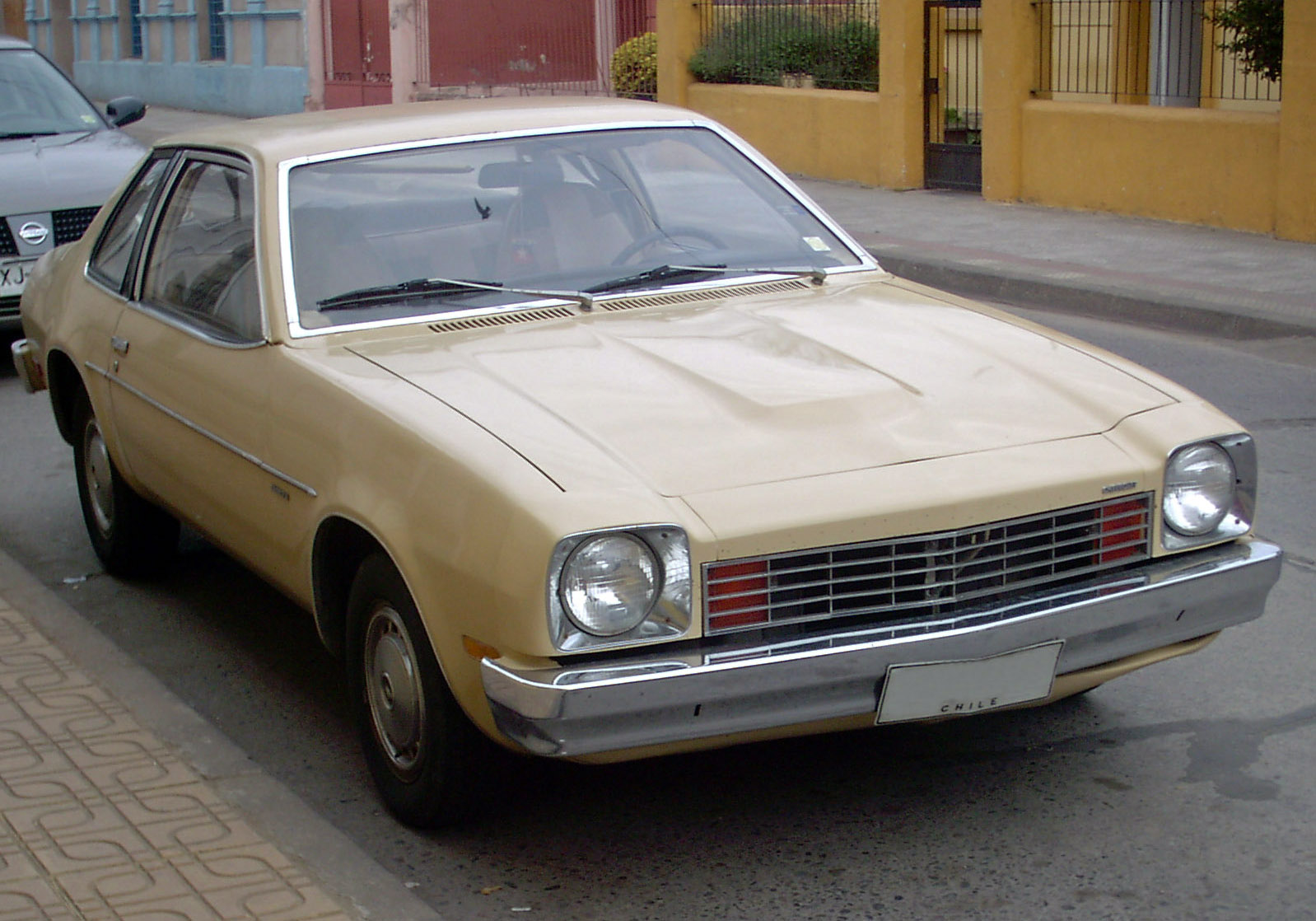
1977 Chevrolet Monza (coupe)

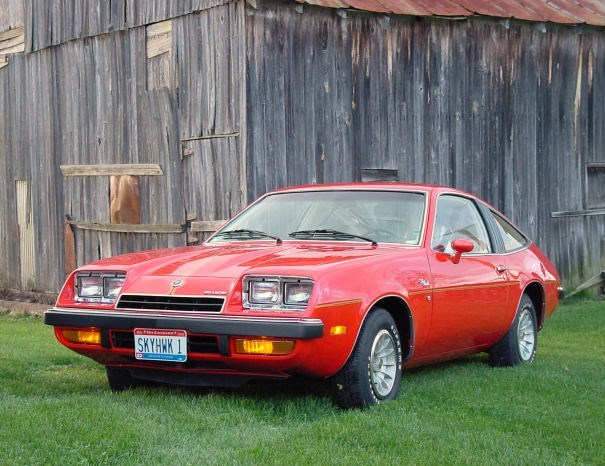
1975 Buick Skyhawk

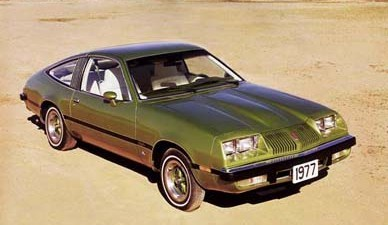
1977 Oldsmobile Starfire

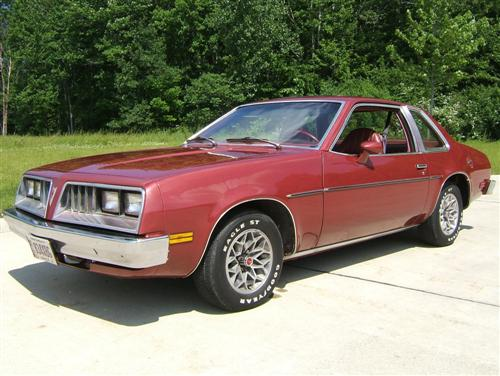
1978 Pontiac Sunbird (coupe)

=== GM divisional engines ===
Prior to 1981, the majority of General Motors vehicles were produced with engines designed by their respective divisions. From 1981 onward, GM ended its policy of divisionally developed engines, instead offering engines under a singular GM brand. As an exception, Cadillac offers division-exclusive engines (the Northstar and Blackwing V8 engine families).

In 1981, GM lost a 1977 lawsuit related to consumers (who purchased 1977 Oldsmobile Delta 88s equipped with a 350 cu in (5.7 L) Chevrolet small-block engine instead of the 350 cu in (5.7 L) Oldsmobile V8 engine). At the time of production, GM had downsized its full-size model lines in preparation for another oil crisis and had increased production of V6 engines as the intended standard engine, underestimating consumer demand for Oldsmobile V8 engines. To accommodate the increased market demand, nearly 60% of Delta 88s were equipped with a Chevrolet 5.7 L V8 for 1977. The lawsuit was filed by the state of Illinois, claiming GM falsely advertised the vehicles. In 1981, GM settled the lawsuit with the vehicle buyers and discontinued their company-unique policy of division-specific engines. Into the 1990s, GM advertising featured a disclaimer stating '"Oldsmobiles (or any other GM division) are equipped with engines manufactured by various GM divisions, subsidiaries and affiliates worldwide."'

=== Lincoln Versailles and Cadillac Cimarron ===
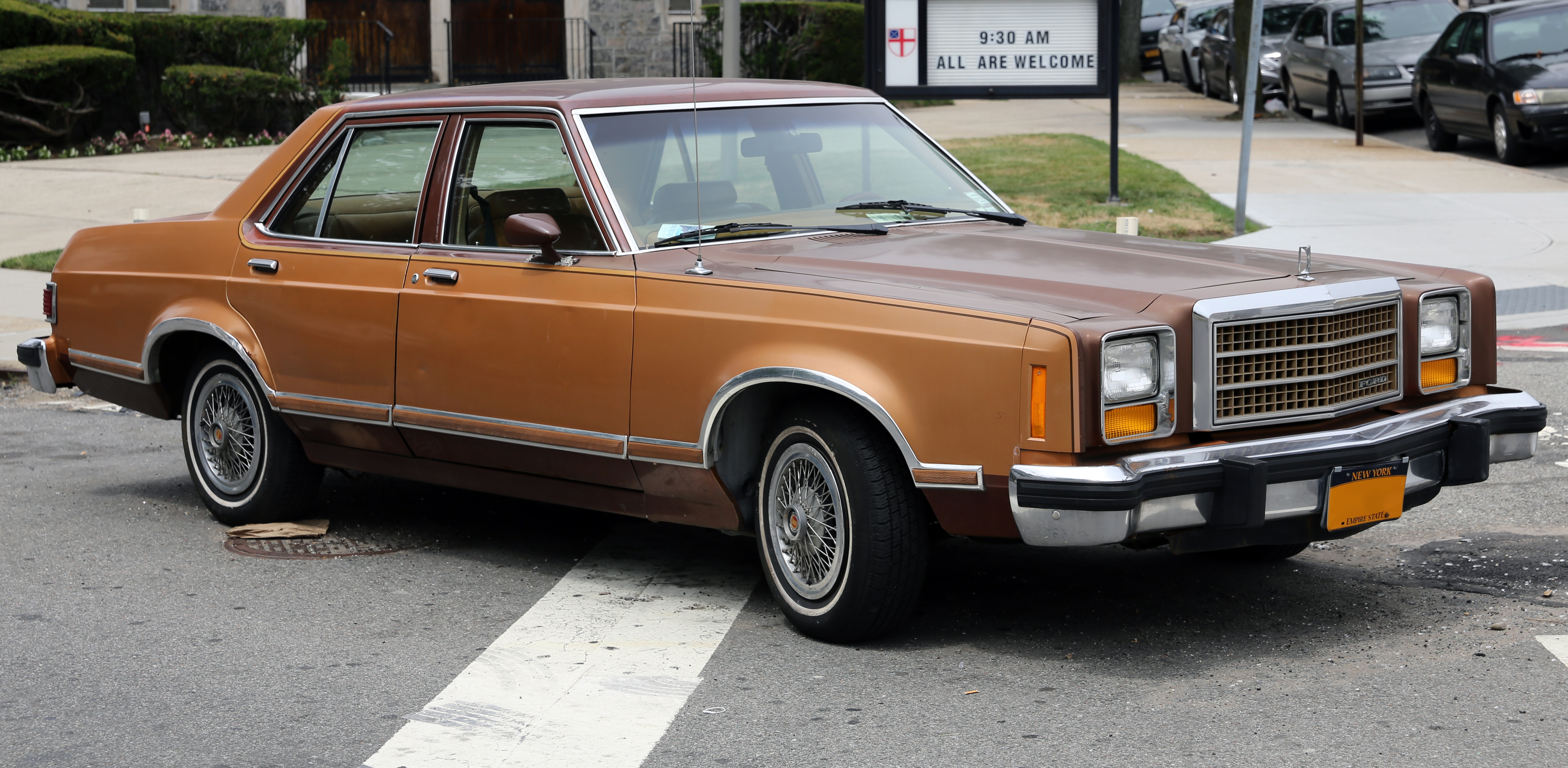
1980 Ford Granada Ghia

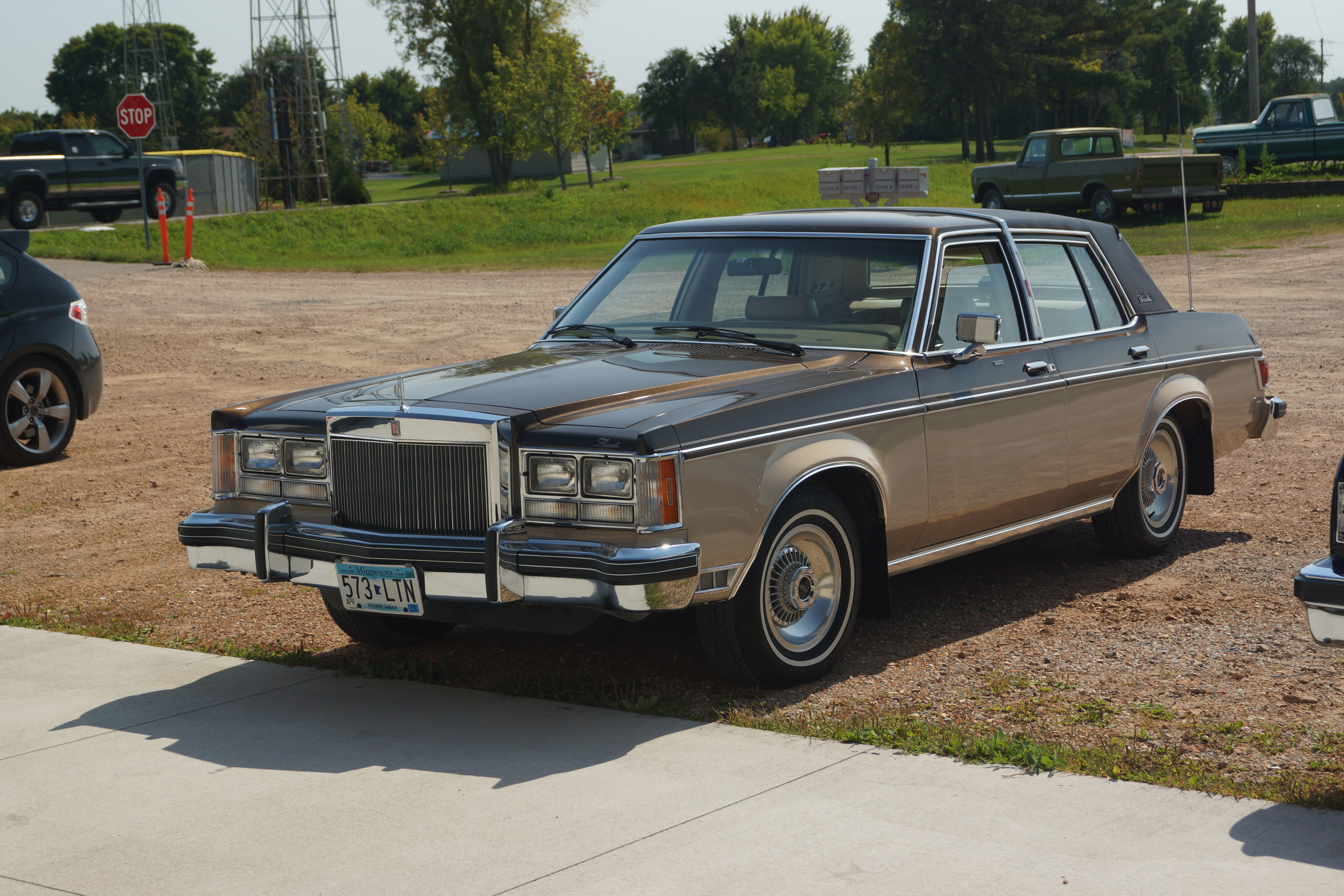
1979 Lincoln Versailles (facelift roofline)

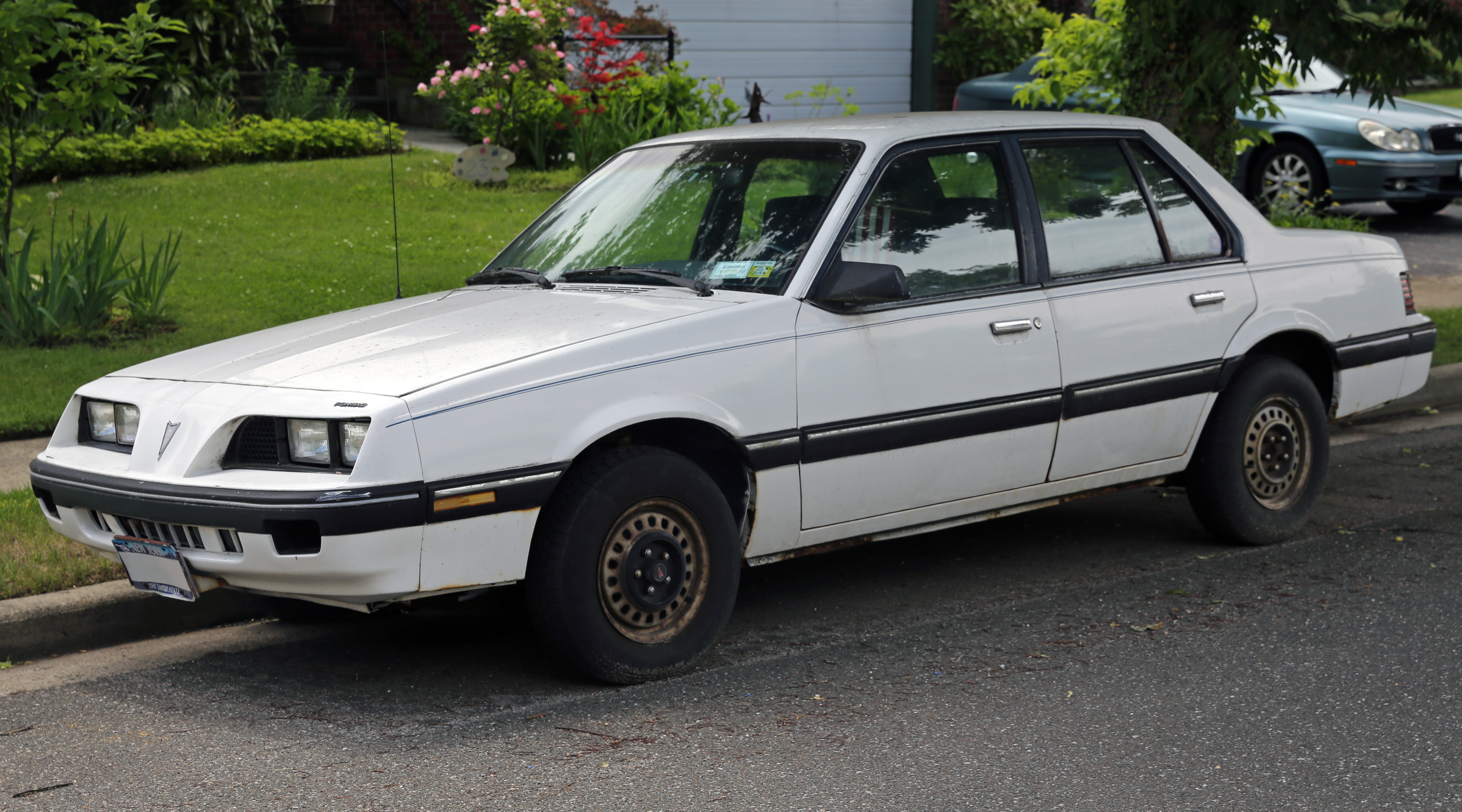
1986 Pontiac Sunbird

1988 Cadillac Cimarron

Design comparison between entry-level brands (left) and luxury vehicles (right) sharing the same platform. Ford Motor Company, top row; General Motors, bottom row.

Prior to the mid-1970s, the American luxury brands Lincoln and Cadillac offered model ranges consisting entirely of full-size two-door and four-door sedans and full-size personal luxury cars. At the beginning of the decade, European automakers began to make entry into the luxury segment in North America with four-door sedans priced similar to the Cadillac Sedan de Ville and Lincoln Continental. Though matching Cadillac and Lincoln in terms of price, the BMW Bavaria/3.0Si, Jaguar XJ6/XJ12, and Mercedes-Benz S-Class (W116) were thousands of pounds lighter and multiple feet shorter in length (with only the hand-built Rolls-Royce Phantom V rivaling Lincoln and Cadillac in size.

In two of the most controversial uses of rebranding in automotive history, Lincoln and Cadillac would introduce smaller vehicles with only minimal visual differentiation between their luxury-brand vehicles and their divisional counterparts.

In line with its Cadillac Seville competitor, the Lincoln Versailles was the most expensive Lincoln sedan (though remaining below the Continental Mark V in price). To compete against the Seville for 1977, Lincoln repackaged the 1975–1976 Mercury Grand Monarch Ghia under its own brand, restyling the decklid, headlamps, taillamps, and grille. For 1979, the roofline was redesigned for a more formal appearance. Outsold by the Seville by a wide margin throughout its production run, Lincoln ended production of the Versailles early in the 1980 model year. The Versailles was never directly replaced within the Lincoln model range; in 1982, Lincoln downsized the Continental to the mid-size segment.

For 1982, Cadillac released the subcompact Cadillac Cimarron, both in response to the 1979 oil crisis and to compete against European-brand executive sedans in the American market. The smallest Cadillac produced since the 1900s, the Cimarron used the chassis of the GM J-body four-door sedan. In contrast to the Seville and the Versailles, the Cimarron was marketed as the entry-level Cadillac. Offered solely as a four-door sedan, the Cimarron shared its roofline with four other GM lines, sharing its body design closest with the Chevrolet Cavalier. While it was the sole model line offered with leather upholstery, a buyer remained able to specify any J-car sedan nearly identically to a Cimarron. While sales of the model line remained steady throughout its production, the model line was discontinued after 1988, as GM management mandated the decision in line with funding to redesign Cadillac full-size product lines.

While the Lincoln Versailles was largely forgotten following the introduction of the 1981 Lincoln Town Car, the 1982 Lincoln Continental, and the 1984 Lincoln Mark VII, the Cimarron would become a central factor behind extensive damage to the Cadillac brand image as its market share declined by almost 50% from 1980 to 1998.

As of current production, neither Lincoln nor Cadillac has marketed a compact-segment car (with the closest between the two brands being the Cadillac BLS - a rebodied version of the Saab 9-3 never marketed in North America). Alongside their use of platform sharing used by their larger vehicles, Lincoln and Cadillac have again used rebranding to market mid-size sedans. For 1997, the Opel Omega B was brought to North America as the Cadillac Catera; in 2000, Lincoln rebodied the Jaguar S-Type as the Lincoln LS. Though the LS would outsell the Catera and remain in production longer, the latter would lead to a fundamental design change at Cadillac, shifting towards its rear-wheel drive layout with a 5-passenger interior.

After the 2020 model year, Lincoln ended sales of sedans in North America; currently, Cadillac produces the CT5, CT6 (China only), and Celestiq sedans.

=== GM A-platform ===
For 1982, GM redesigned and downsized its A-body mid-size cars, releasing a front-wheel drive version of its A-car platform for the Buick Century, Chevrolet Celebrity (replacing the Malibu), Oldsmobile Cutlass Ciera (replacing the Cutlass), and Pontiac 6000 (replacing the LeMans).

In contrast to the 1980-1981 versions of each generation (which used a single design), two different rooflines were used by the four sedans (shared between Buick and Chevrolet, and Oldsmobile and Pontiac). On the August 22, 1983 cover of Fortune, the four GM A-body sedans (each the same color) were parked in a single row, with only the car in the foreground (a Celebrity) being identifiable through its wheel covers and side badging. The incident embarrassed GM internally and played a large role in the 1986 departure of Irv Rybicki from GM.

To redevelop its design leadership, the company began design work on multiple concept cars, previewing future design innovations, and mandating that the GM10 design program (today, GM W platform), reduced external design commonality between divisions. In addition, the GM10 was to establish the brand identity for each GM division: Buick, personal luxury with the Regal; Chevrolet, value with the Lumina; Oldsmobile, advanced technology with the Cutlass Supreme; Pontiac, performance and excitement with the Grand Prix.

=== Eagle (Chrysler) ===
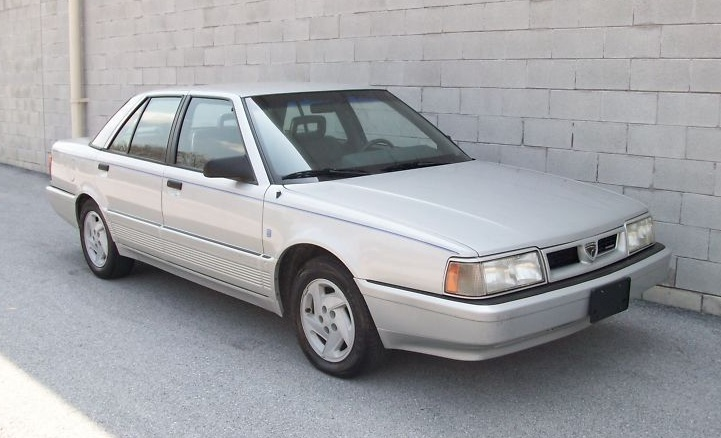
1992 Eagle Premier (Renault 25/Dodge Monaco)

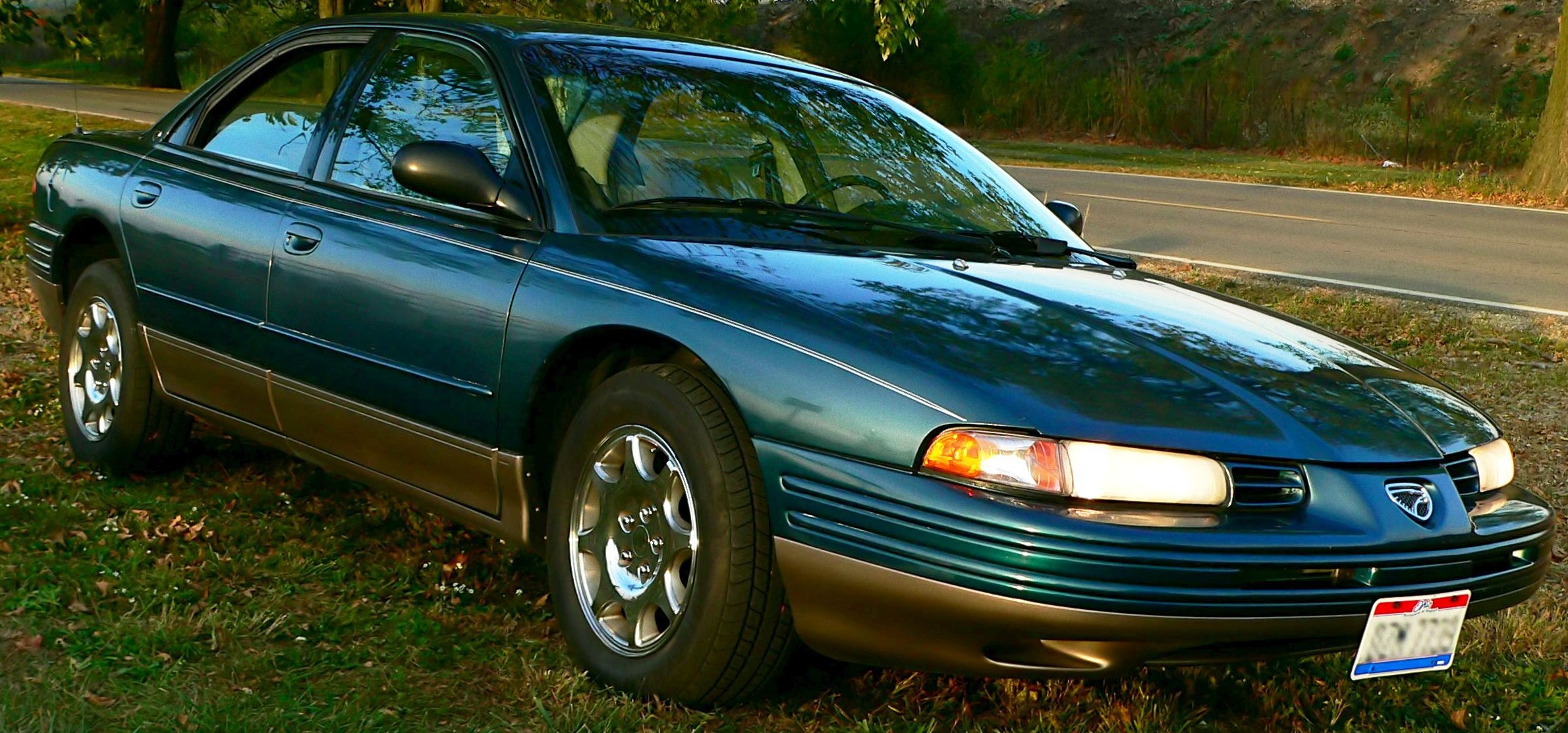
1995 Eagle Vision (Chrysler Concorde/Dodge Intrepid)

In 1987, Chrysler Corporation acquired American Motors Corporation (AMC) from Renault, leading to the exit of the French automaker from the North American market. As part of the sale, Chrysler obtained the AMC dealership network, the AMC Eagle all-wheel drive car, and the Jeep line of sport-utility vehicles and pickup trucks. To market the vehicles, Chrysler established the Jeep-Eagle Division (the latter, in deference to AMC).

During 1988, Chrysler retired the Eagle station wagon (derived from the 1971 AMC Hornet) and the Jeep Pickup (dating to 1962), introducing the Eagle Premier and Eagle Medallion (both designed by Renault before the sale of AMC). Chrysler Canada released the Eagle Vista as the counterpart of the Dodge/Plymouth Colt, beginning the transition of the division towards Mitsubishi-based product lines.

For 1989, Eagle began further moves towards establishing its brand identity. Along with moving further away from its Renault origins, the brand adopted an image of specialty cars different from established Chrysler product lines, marketed towards consumers interested in imported vehicles. Consequently, the Eagle Summit was introduced as a counterpart of the Mitsubishi-produced Dodge/Plymouth Colt, with Chrysler shifting marketing of captive imports to Eagle and the Neon ultimately replacing both the Colt and the Omni/Horizon for Dodge and Plymouth. For 1990, Eagle dropped the Medallion and introduced the Eagle Talon sport compact coupe alongside the Mitsubishi Eclipse and Plymouth Laser.

For 1992, Eagle replaced the Premier in favor of the Eagle Vision. The first Chrysler-designed Eagle car line, the Vision was slotted between the Dodge Intrepid and Chrysler Concorde; sharing much of its exterior trim with the latter, it was distinguished by being the only Chrysler LH car marketed with a standard five-passenger interior. The Canada-only Eagle Vista Wagon was replaced by the Eagle Summit compact MPV, a rebranding of the Mitsubishi RVR; in another change, the model was also marketed in the United States.

For 1993, Eagle introduced a second generation of the Summit (trading its hatchback body for a two-door coupe). While remaining a captive import counterpart of the Mitsubishi Mirage, in a major change, the Summit lost its Dodge/Plymouth Colt counterparts during 1994, as they were replaced by the Neon line of compact cars (which replaced the Colt, the Omni/Horizon, and the Shadow/Sundance).

For 1995, a second-generation Talon was introduced. Alongside the retirement of the Plymouth Laser, the redesign brought a much larger degree of model differentiation between the Talon and its Mitsubishi Eclipse counterpart, with the Eagle adopting more aggressive exterior styling.

The 1995 Eagle Talon would ultimately become the final production vehicle released by the brand. After 1996, the Summit was retired without replacement, with the Vision following suit after 1997. Following the 1998 DaimlerChrysler merger, the Eagle brand was retired, with Chrysler integrating the Jeep brand into its Chrysler or Dodge dealership networks. The 1999 Chrysler 300M was originally developed as the second-generation Eagle Vision as a sport-oriented full-size sedan; following the discontinuation of Eagle, Chrysler repackaged the vehicle under its namesake brand as a shorter, sportier version of the Chrysler LHS, with the Eagle design adopting a slightly restyled grille for Chrysler badging along with Chrysler interior trim.

=== Lexus ES250 and Infiniti M30 ===
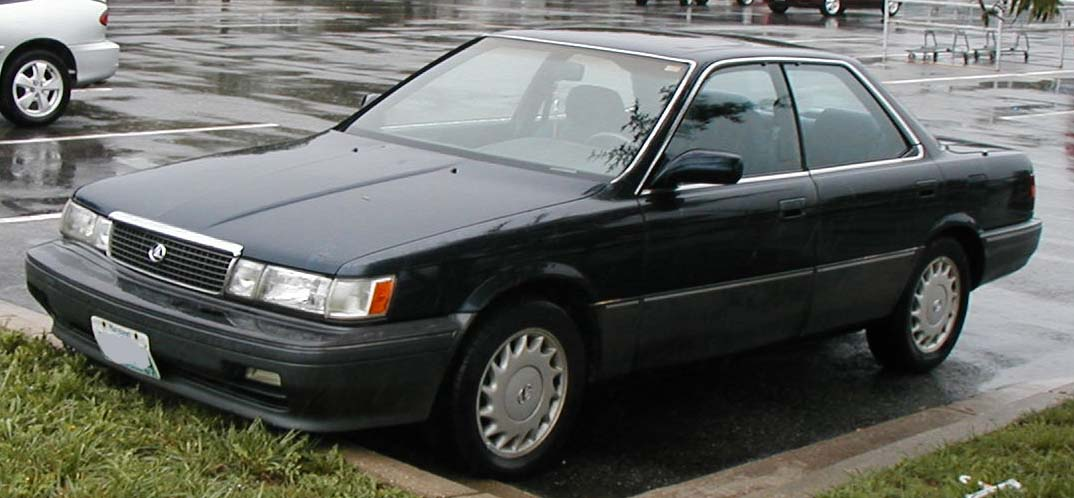
Lexus ES250 (Toyota Camry Prominent/Toyota Vista)

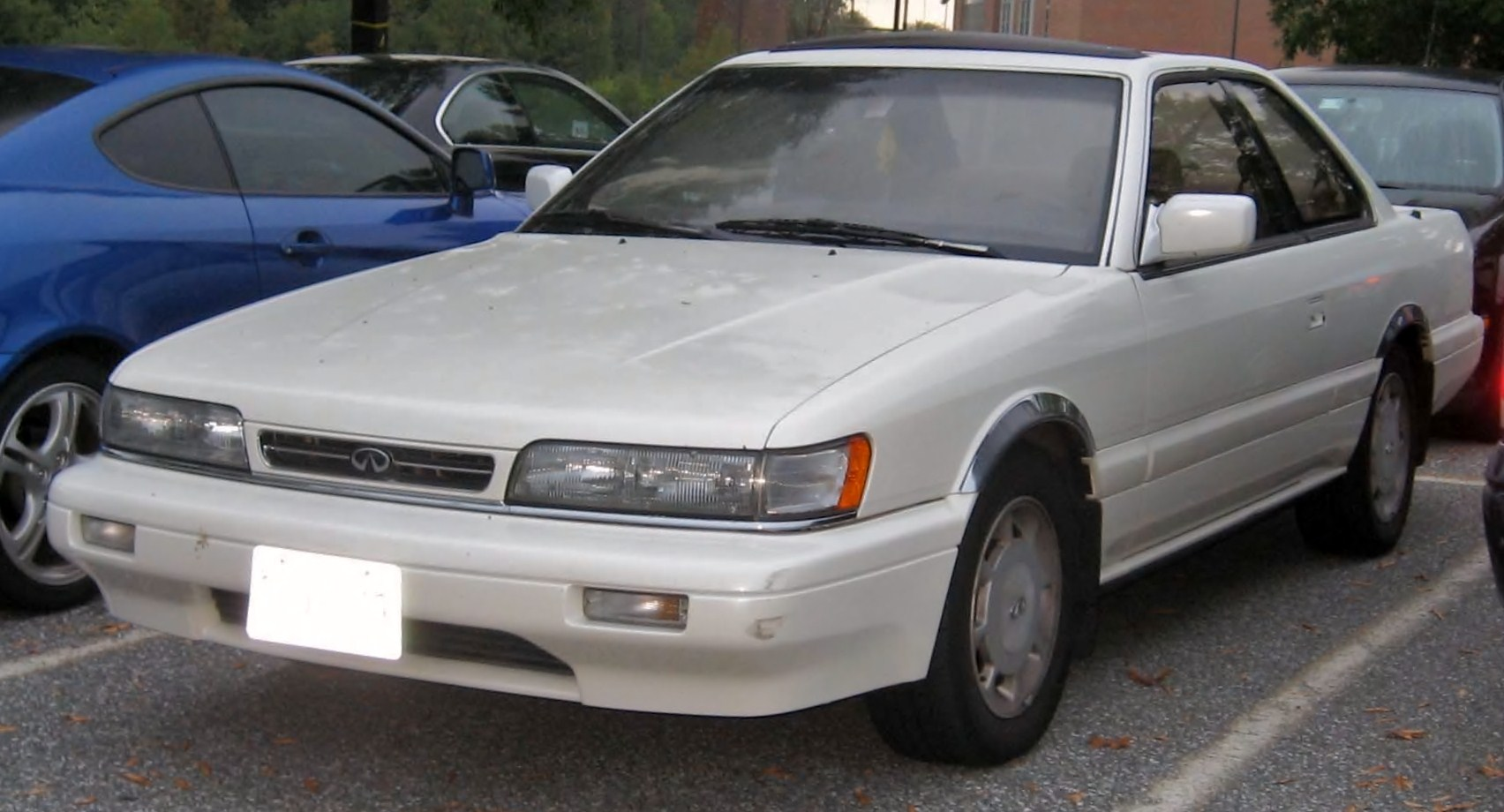
Infiniti M30 (Nissan Leopard)

For the 1989 model year, Toyota and Nissan introduced the Lexus and Infiniti luxury brands in the United States (following the Acura luxury brand of Honda) with the all-new Lexus LS400 and Infiniti Q45 full-size sedans. Both brands expanded their model line for 1990, sourcing an existing model line from the Japanese market to rebrand as an entry-level offering.

The Lexus ES250 is a four-door sedan derived from the V20 Toyota Camry. Though visibly similar to the Camry introduced for 1987, the ES250 was a rebranded Toyota Camry Prominent/Vista; a model developed for Japan, the Prominent/Vista (dependent on sales network) is a four-door pillared hardtop sedan with a slightly lower roofline and restyled body panels. Along with the change to left-hand drive, the ES250 adopted an interior similar to the larger LS (along with similarly styled wheels and taillamps).

The Infiniti M30 is a two-door notchback coupe derived from the Nissan Leopard (a model never sold in North America). Along with the coupe, Infiniti sold the M30 as a two-door convertible (converted in the United States). With the exception of its badging and its dashboard (sourced from the left-hand drive Nissan Skyline), the M30 differed from the Leopard primarily in its steering wheel location.

Intended largely as placeholder models, the ES250 and M30 were largely overshadowed by their companion flagship sedans. Following the end of the 1992 model year, both models were withdrawn (as their Japanese counterparts had ended their model cycles). For 1993, the ES250 was replaced by the ES300; while again sharing its body with a Japanese-market Toyota (Toyota Vista/Windom) and its chassis and engine with the Camry, the ES300 shared no resemblance to the American-market Camry. Infiniti moved away from a two-door coupe entirely, replacing the M30 with the four-door J30 (Nissan Leopard J Ferie in Japan).

=== Rover CityRover ===
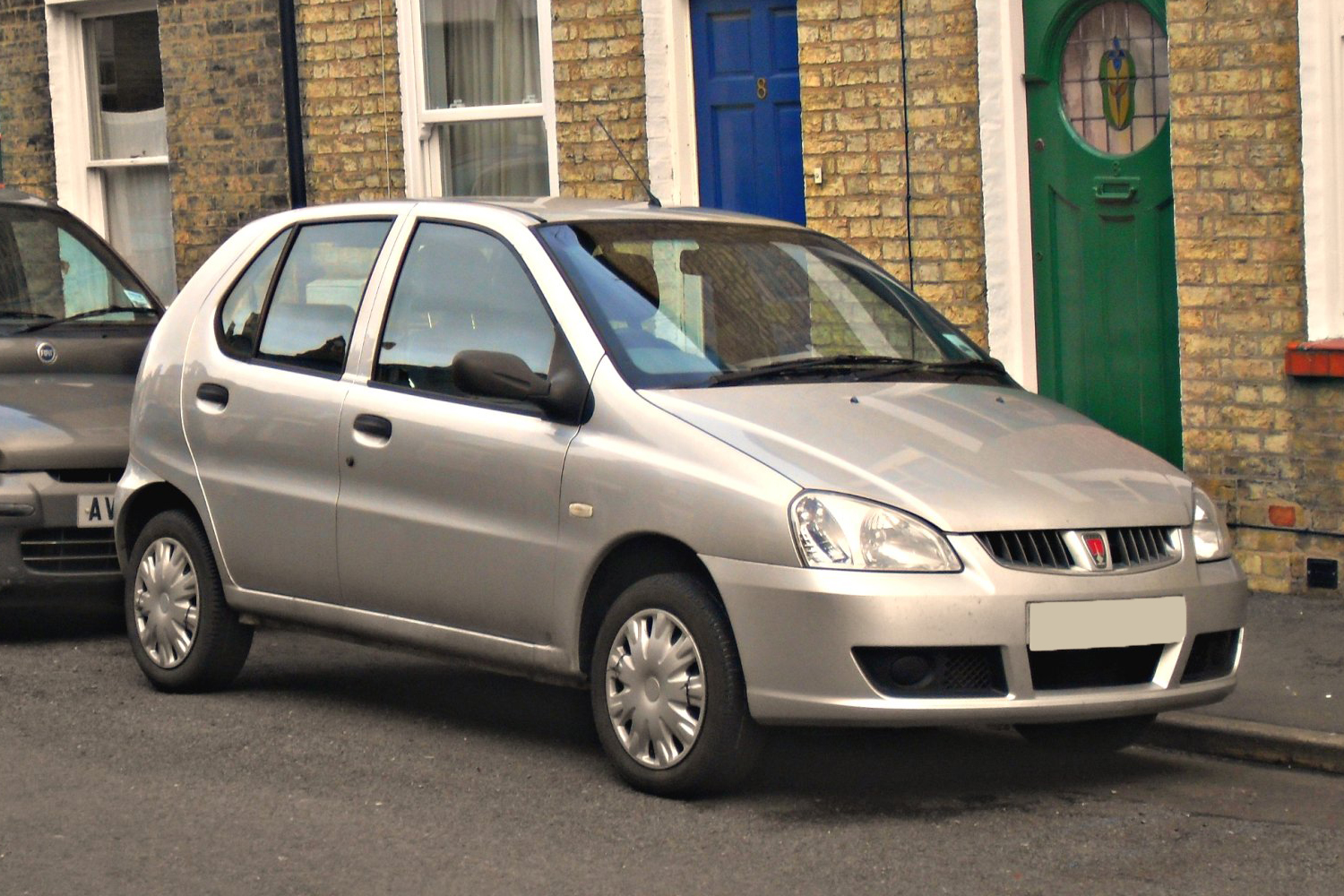
2004 Rover CityRover (Tata Indica)

The Rover CityRover, launched in 2003 as the last vehicle from the MG Rover Group, was a rebadged Tata Indica made in India. English motoring journalist George Fowler criticized the MG Rover Group, which was enjoying national sympathy from the British public as the last domestically owned automobile manufacturer, stating the CityRover was "a duplicitous attempt to 'save Rover' by flogging an Indian car on which the only Rover bits were the badges".

== Models produced under license ==
A variant of rebadging is licensing models to be produced by other companies, typically in another country. The earliest such vehicle was the Austin 7 (1922–1939), designed and built by Austin Motor Company and licensed to other manufacturers across continents, which became their first-ever model. The Bantam in the US that would eventually build the first Jeep, BMW in Germany, and Nissan in Japan.

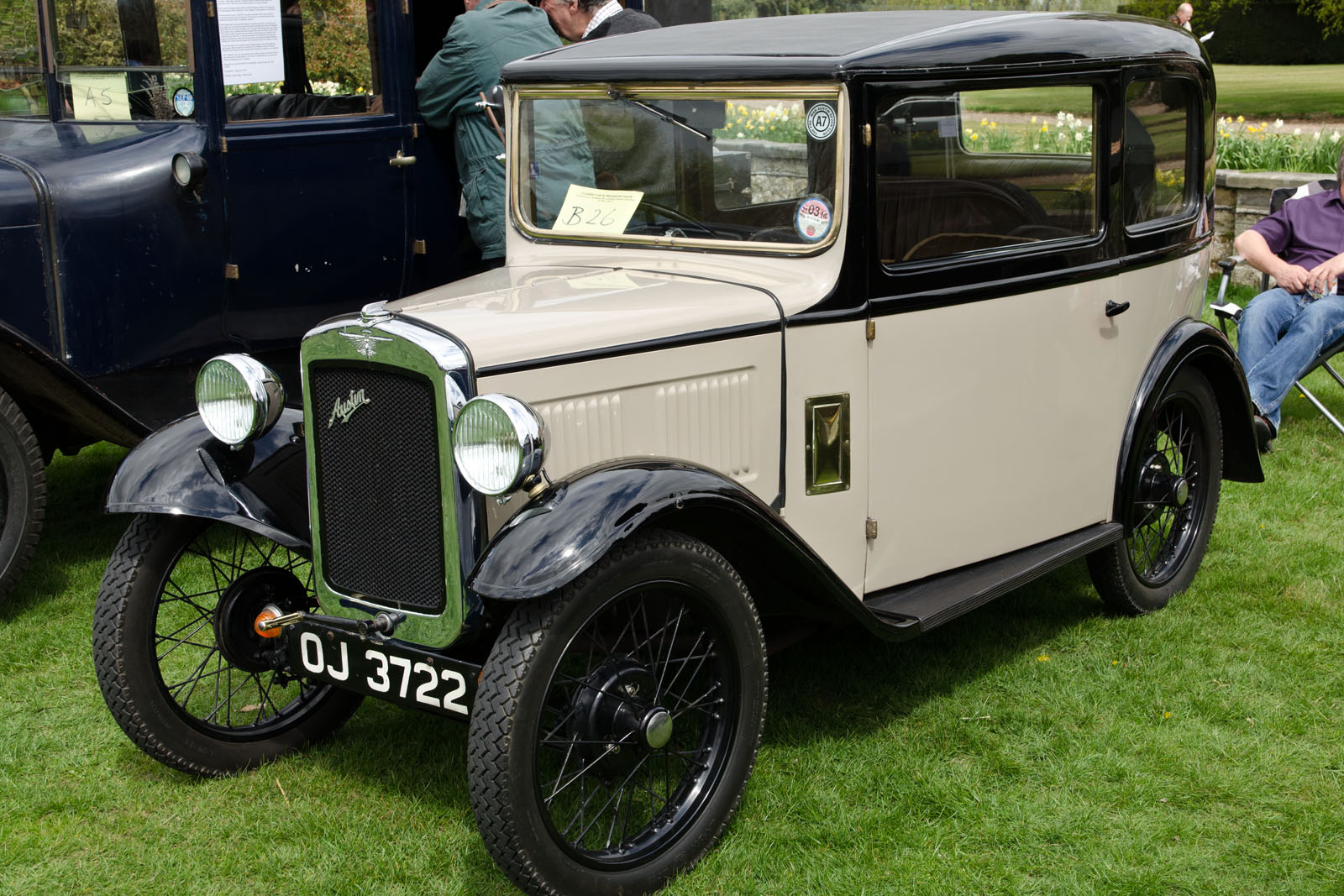
Austin 7

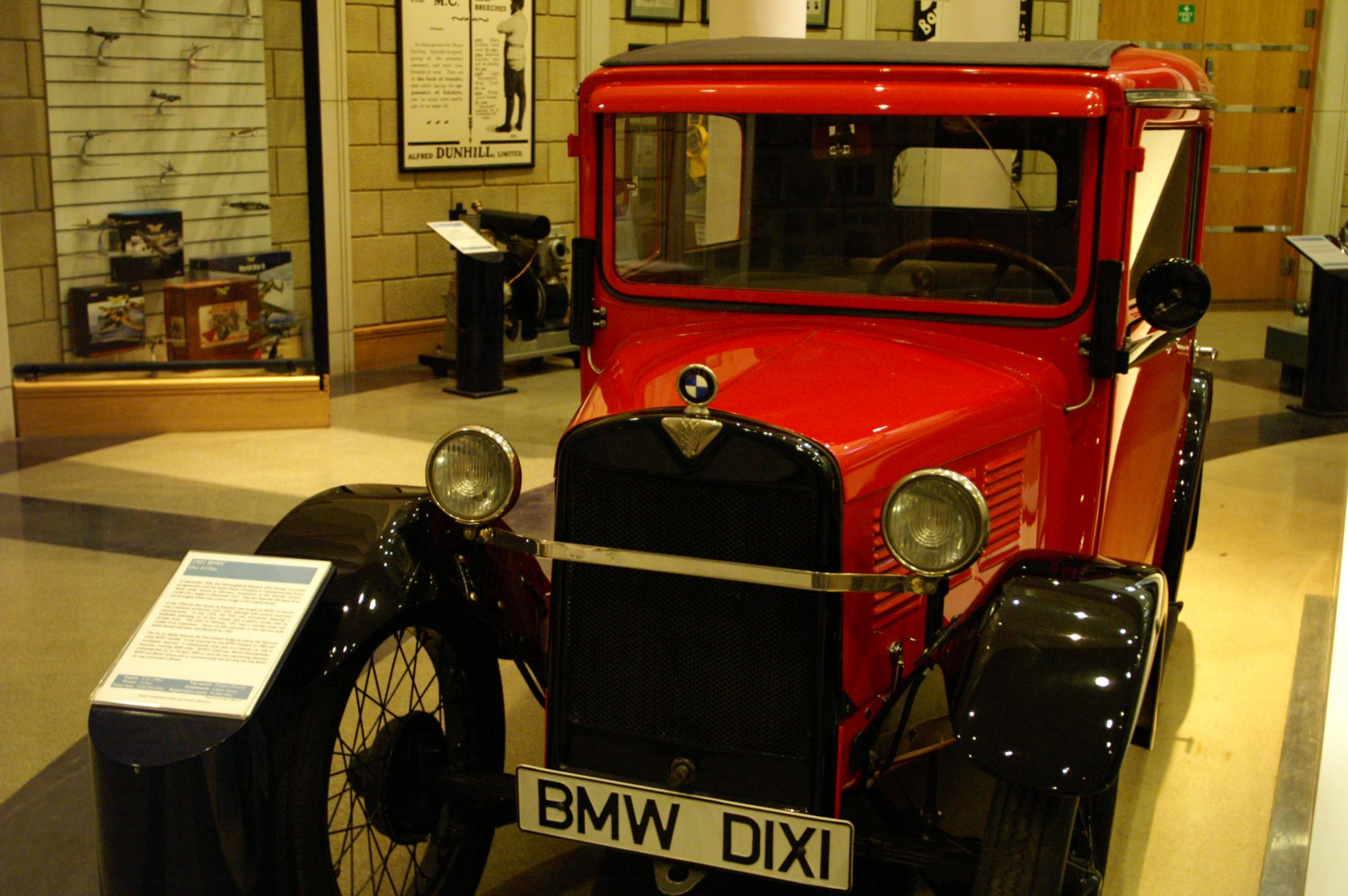
BMW Dixi

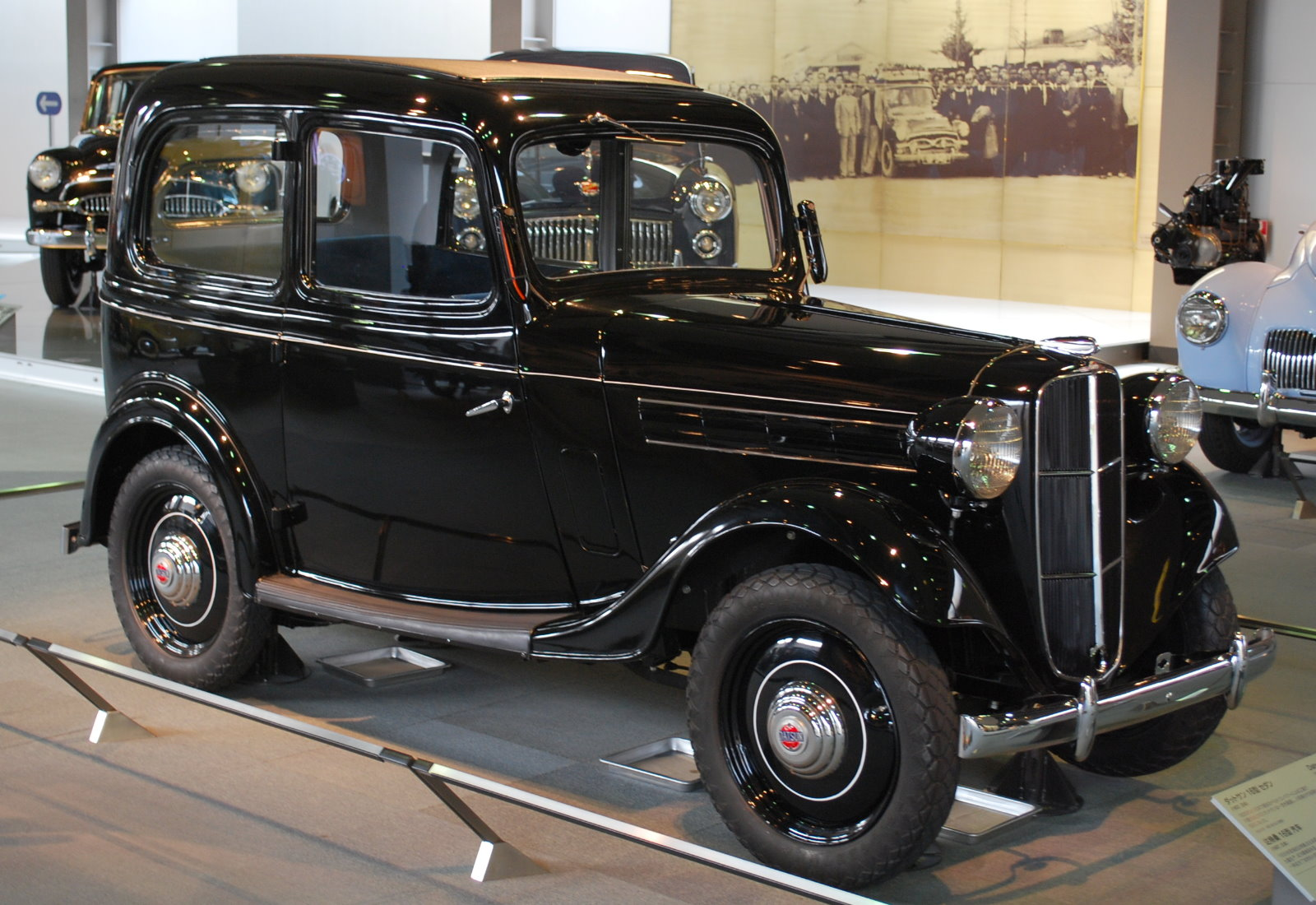
Nissan Datsun Model 16

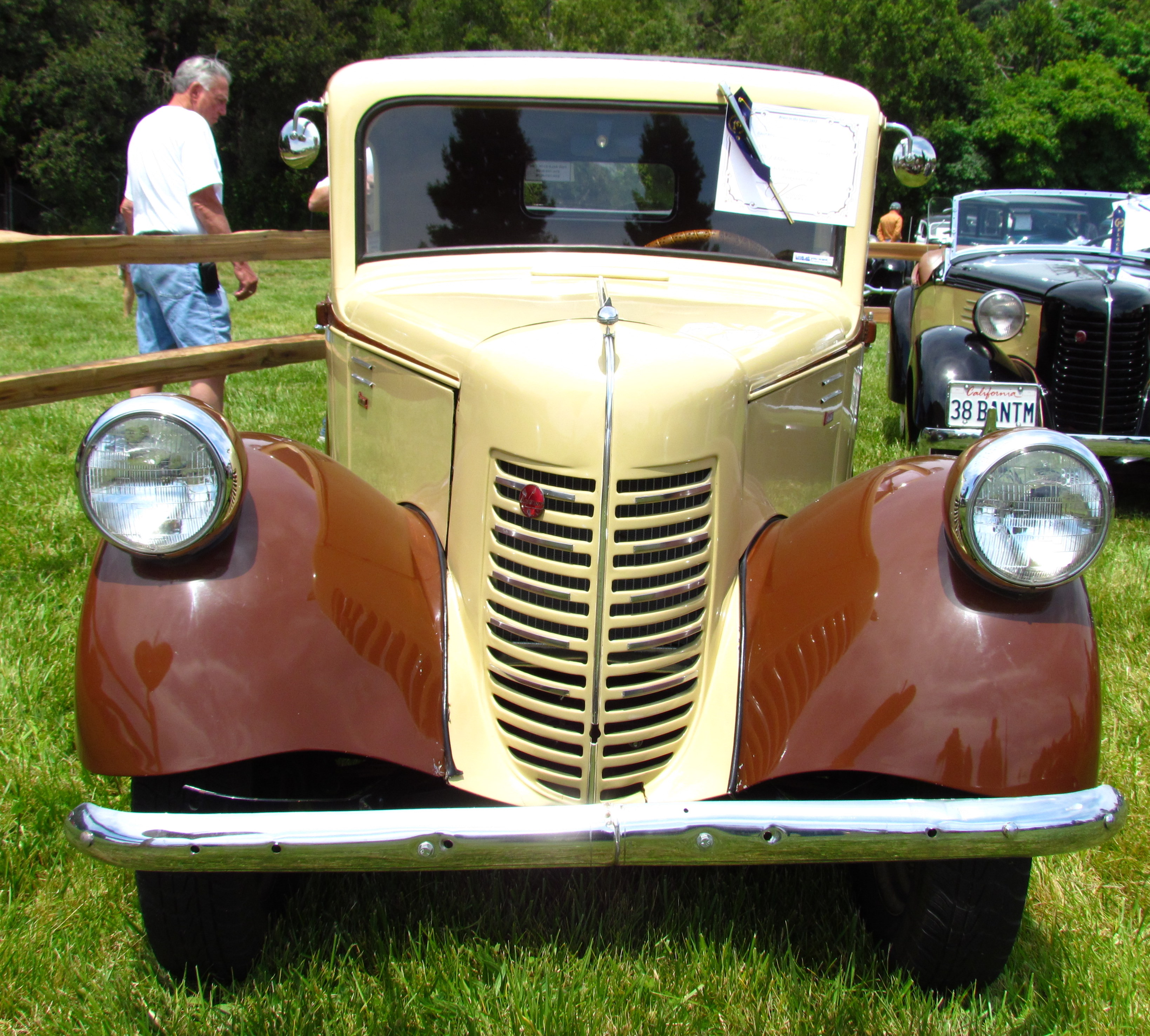
Bantam Speedster

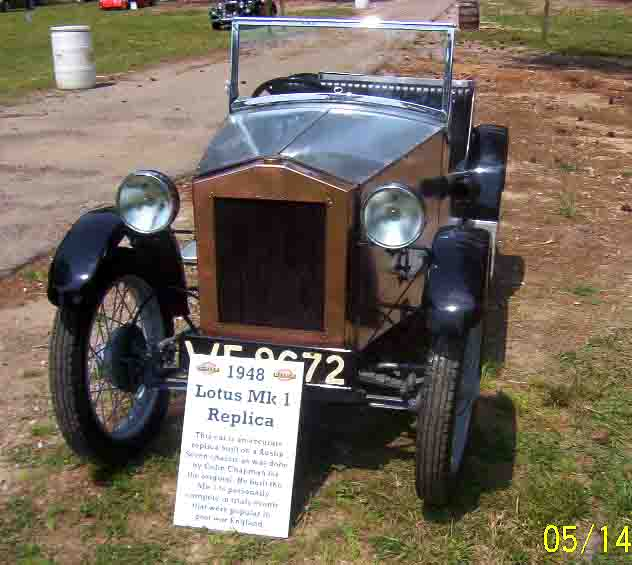
Lotus Mark 1

Among the post-war cars, the Fiat 124 designed and built by Fiat, Italy was licensed to various other manufacturers from different countries. It became a dominant car in many Eastern Europe and West Asian countries.

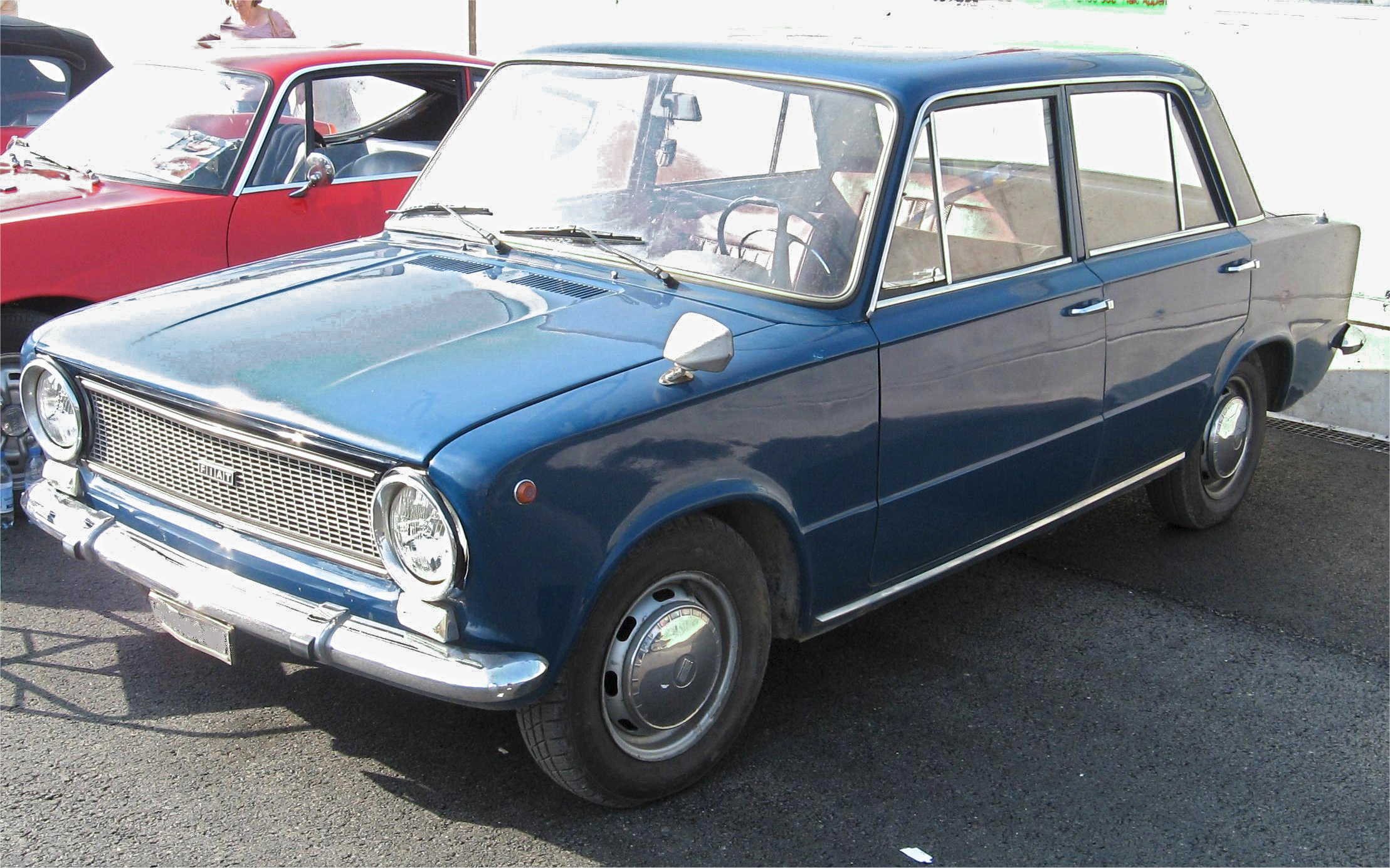
Fiat 124, Italy and various countries

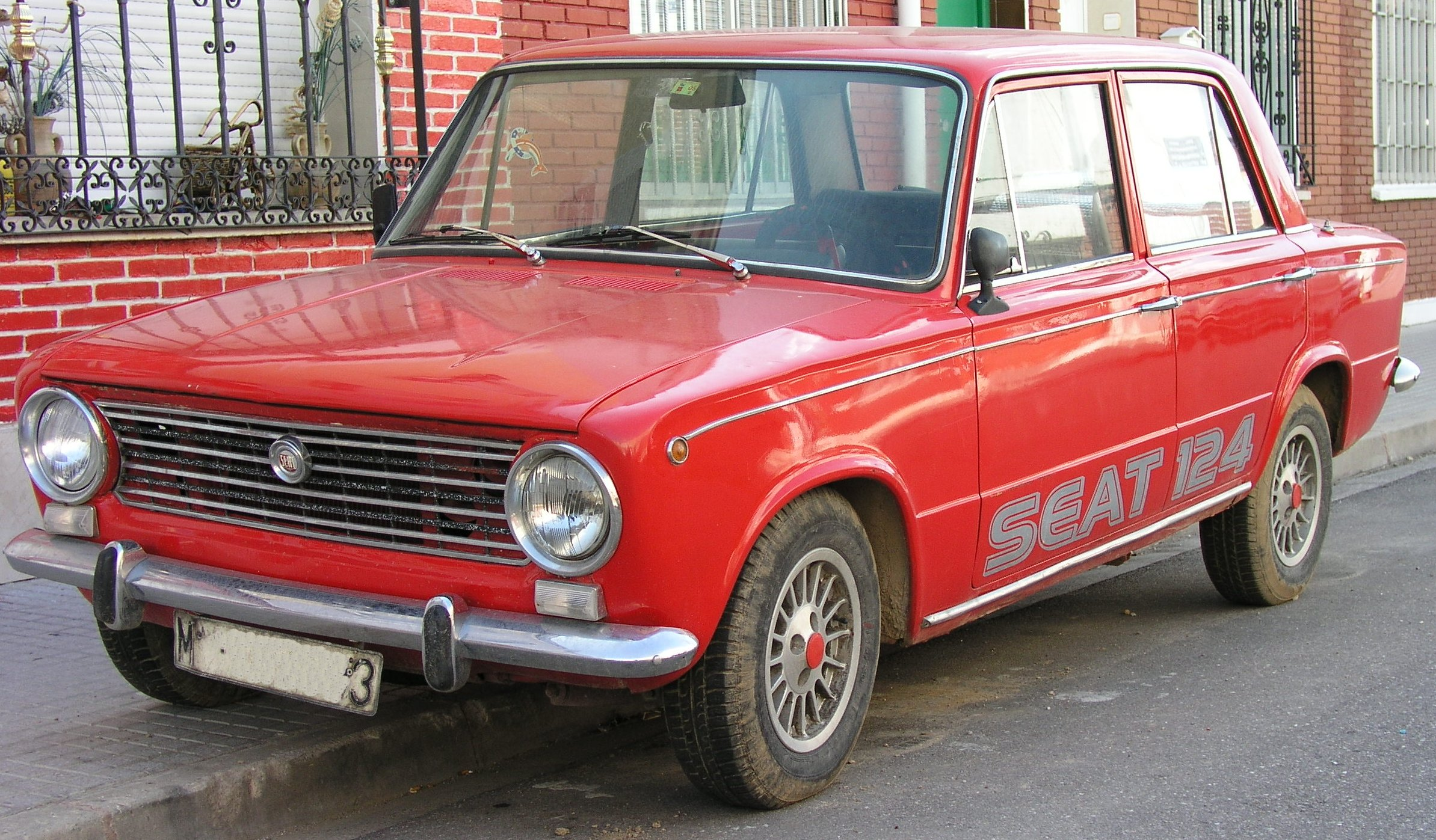
SEAT 124, Spain

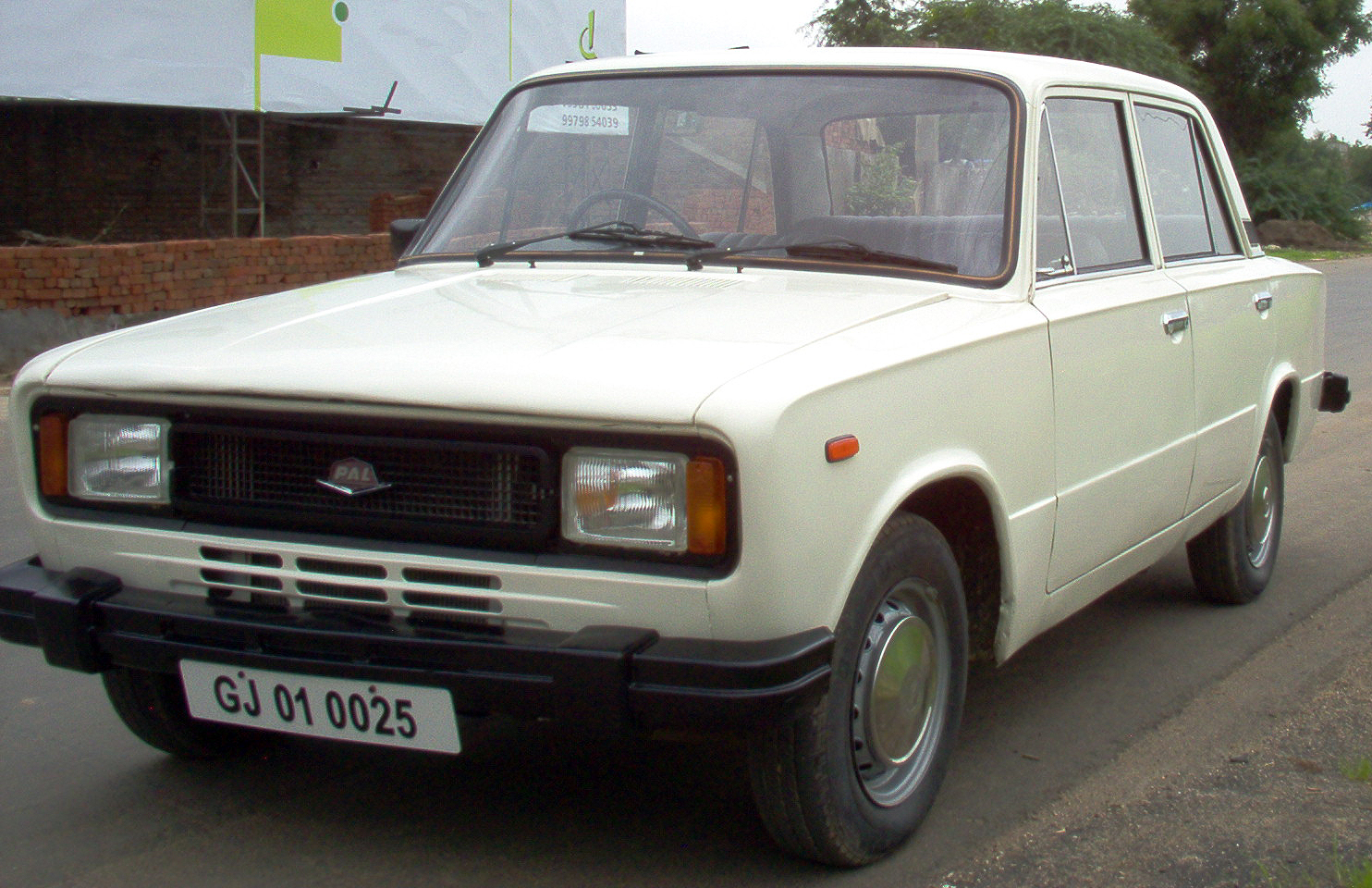
Premier 118NE, India (Based on Giugiaro's facelift of the 1975 SEAT 124)

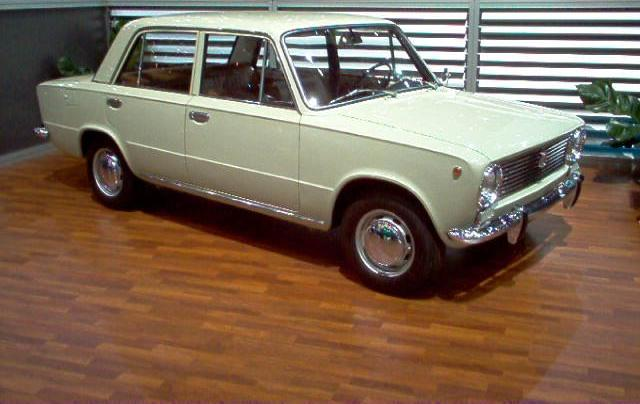
VAZ-2101 / Lada, Russia and Eastern Europe

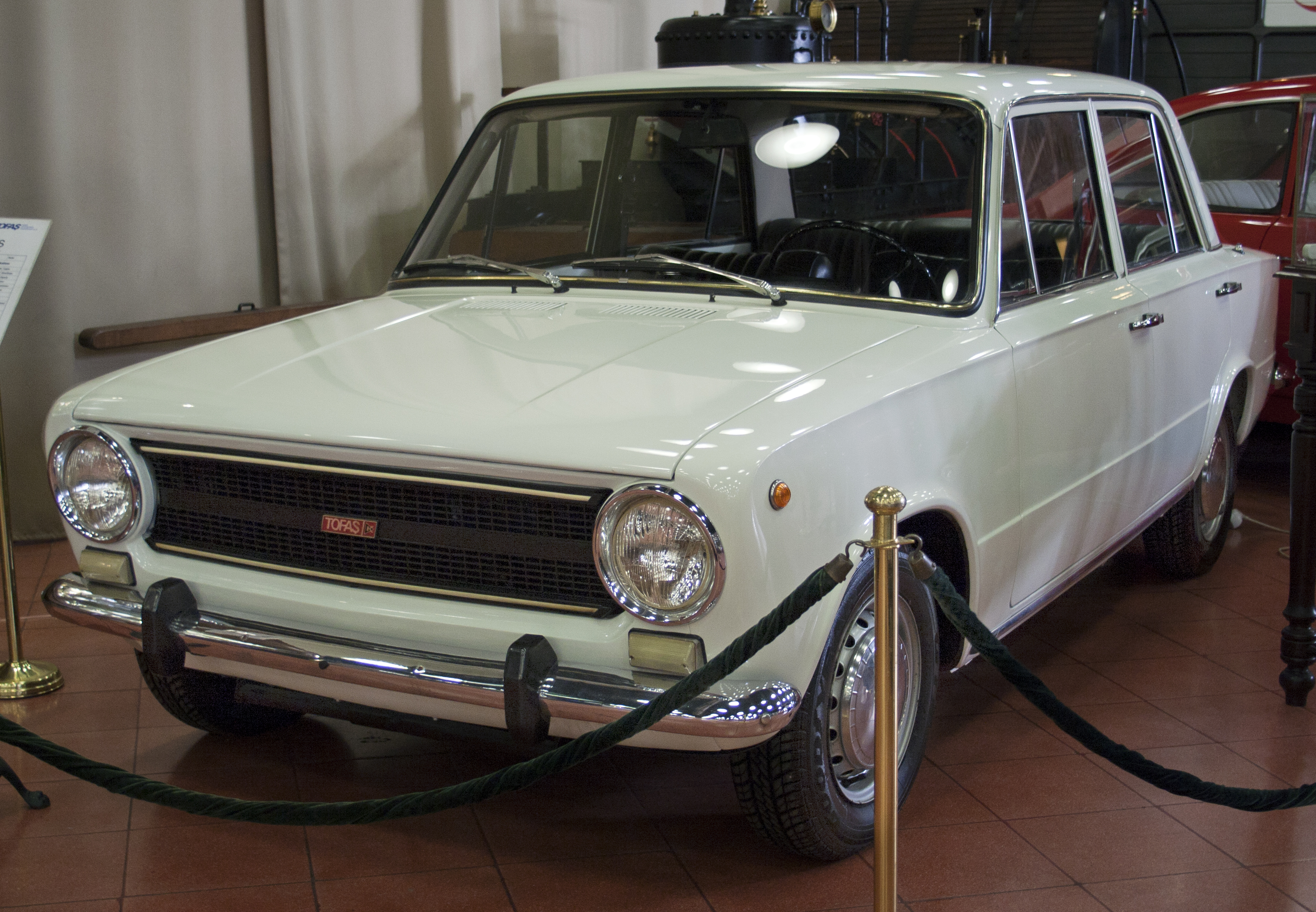
Tofaş Murat 124, Turkey

The Morris Oxford Series IV built by Morris of England in 1955 would become Hindustan Ambassador in India and was manufactured until 2014. Another example of this is the British Hillman Hunter, which was license-built in Iran as the Paykan, as well as Naza, building vehicles under license from Kia and Peugeot (Naza 206 Bestari).

A similar example of licensed badge-engineered products would be the Volga Siber, a rebadged version of the Chrysler Sebring sedan and the Dodge Stratus sedan produced in Russia from 2008 until 2010.

== See also ==
- Debadging
- List of badge-engineered vehicles
- Builder's plate
- White-label product
