= Sex life =

Sector of a person's life

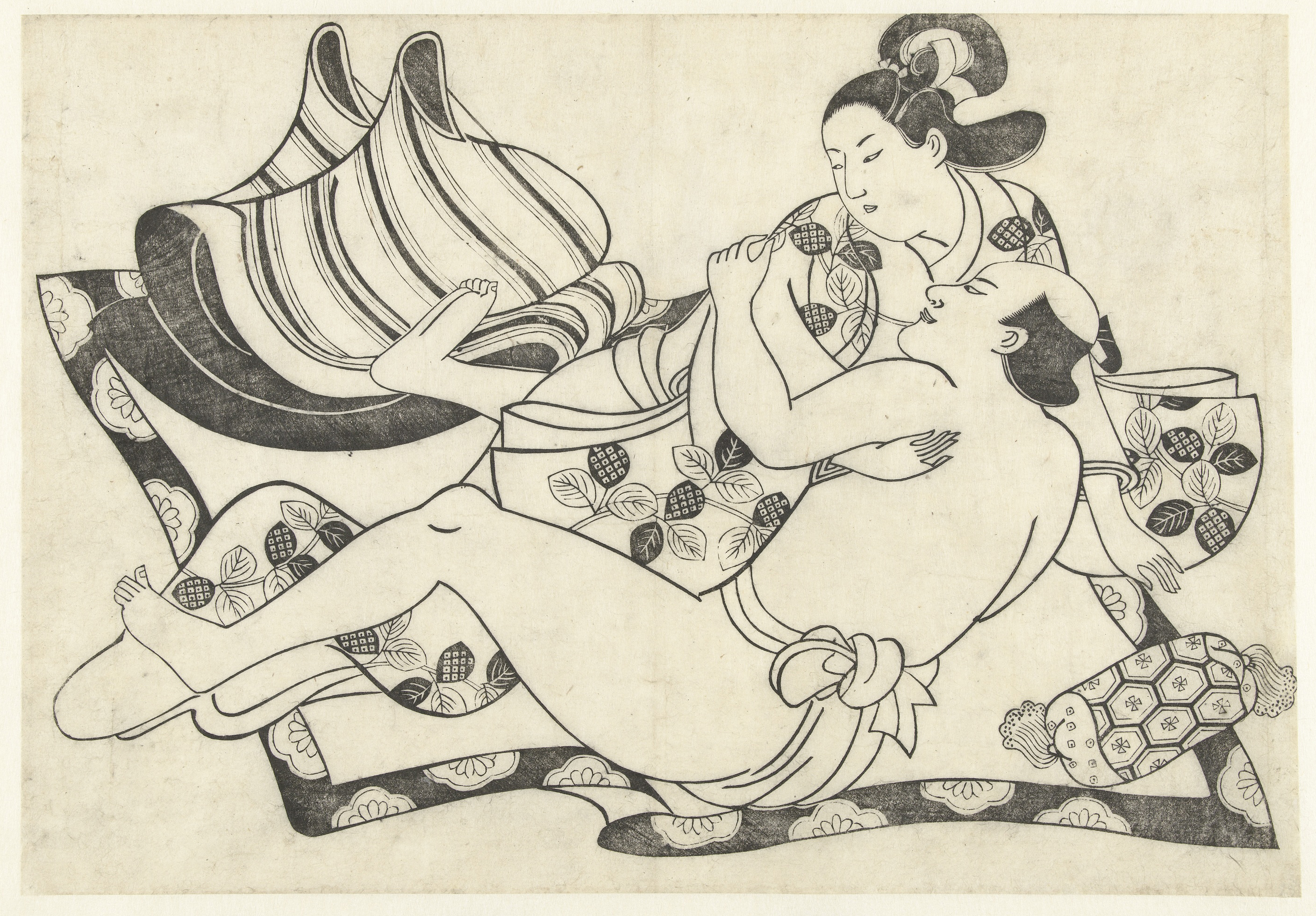
Sex life

In human sexuality, a person's sex life is the aspect or degree of sexual activity with others in their day-to-day existence. The individual is able to, on an either regular or semi-regular basis, enter into voluntarily agreed and consensual situations involving partnered sexual activity, i.e. an activity other than solo masturbation. This would inherently mean there is at least one other person per situation, with or without sexual activity, and regardless of whether these situations are sexually monogamous; i.e., a "sex life" can be had just as easily with a long-term sexual partner as it can with multiple partners in rapid succession over a lifetime.

== Sex frequency ==
Several sources say that in humans, frequency of sexual intercourse might range from 0 to 20 times a week. Absence of sex life over longer periods of time is described as sexual abstinence.

In the United States, the average frequency of sexual intercourse for married couples is 2 to 3 times a week. It is generally recognized that postmenopausal women experience declines in frequency of sexual intercourse and that average frequency of intercourse declines with age. According to the Kinsey Institute, average frequency of sexual intercourse in US is 112 times per year (age 18–29), 86 times per year (age 30–39), and 69 times per year (age 40–49).

In a number of sexual harassment cases, certain employees and others have been asked about their sex lives, often repeatedly, including in a case filed against Mitsubishi Motor Manufacturing of America by the Equal Employment Opportunity Commission (EEOC).
