= Mitsubishi Eclipse =

Sports compact car produced by Mitsubishi Motors (1990–2012)

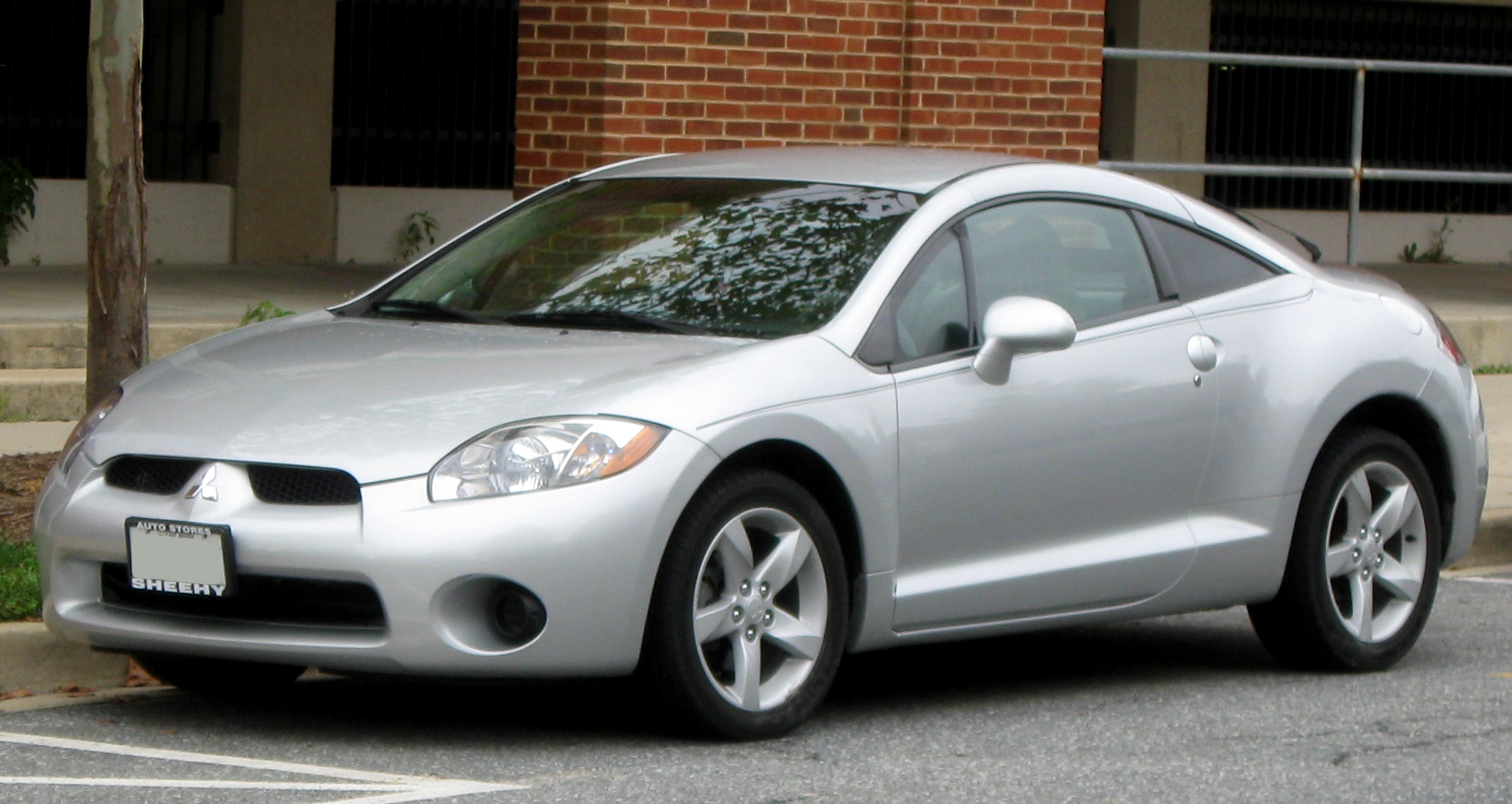
- Fourth-generation Mitsubishi Eclipse GS coupe

Overview
- Manufacturer: Mitsubishi Motors
- Production: 1989–August 2011 (906,876 units)
- Model years: 1990–2012
- Assembly: United States: Normal, Illinois (Diamond-Star Motors/MMNA)

Body and chassis
- Class: Sport compact
- Body style: 3-door liftback coupé (1990–2012); 2-door convertible (1996–2012)
- Layout: Front-engine, front-wheel-drive Front-engine, All-wheel-drive (first and second generation only)

Chronology
- Predecessor: Mitsubishi Cordia; Mitsubishi Starion (US-spec)

The Mitsubishi Eclipse (Japanese: 三菱・エクリプス, Hepburn: Mitsubishi Ekuripusu) is a sport compact car which was manufactured and marketed by Mitsubishi over four generations in the 1990–2012 model years. A convertible body style was added during the 1996 model year.

The first two generations were marketed simultaneously as the rebadged variants Eagle Talon, while the first generation was also marketed as the Plymouth Laser. These were the result of Mitsubishi Motors and Chrysler Corporation's close alliance at the time, a partnership which gave rise to Diamond-Star Motors (DSM). In Japan, the first two generations were sold through a specific Japanese retail chain called Mitsubishi Car Plaza. The third, 2000–2005 generation shared an extended wheelbase variant of their platform with the Chrysler Sebring and Dodge Stratus. In May 2005, the fourth, and final generation Eclipse was introduced, replacing the Chrysler platform used for the third generation with the PS platform.

According to Mitsubishi, the Eclipse was named after an unbeaten 18th-century English racehorse that won 18 races in a row and then retired. At the end of August 2011, the final Eclipse was manufactured and auctioned for charity. In 2017, Mitsubishi resurrected the Eclipse name on a compact crossover vehicle, called the Eclipse Cross.

== First generation (D21A/D22A/D27A; 1990) ==
First generation
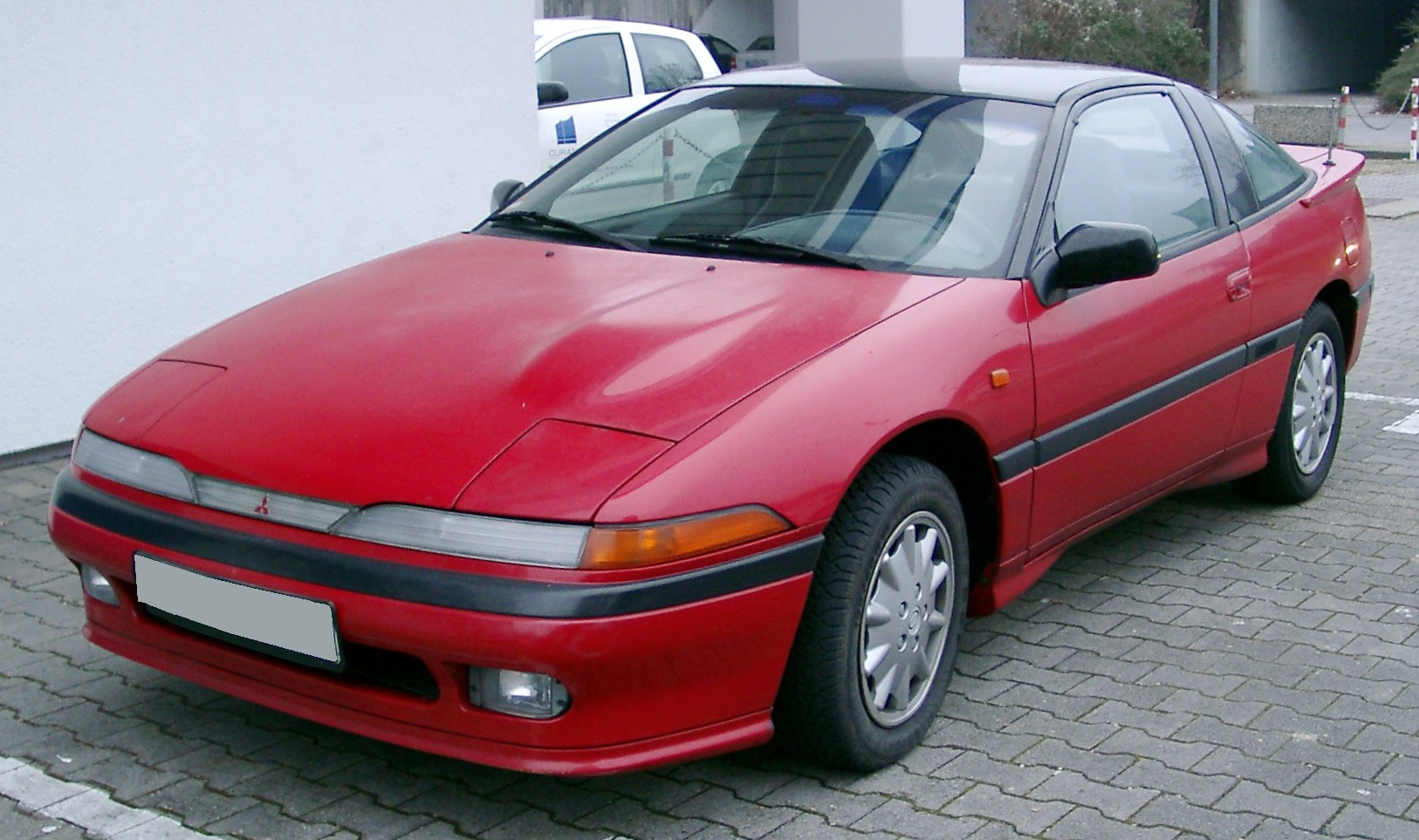
- Pre-facelift Mitsubishi Eclipse GS

Overview
- Model code: D21A/D22A/D27A
- Production: 1989–1994
- Model years: 1990–1994
- Assembly: United States: Normal, Illinois (Diamond-Star Motors)
- Designer: Roger Zrimec and David O'Connell (1984); Nobutaka Imada (interior)

Body and chassis
- Body style: 3-door liftback coupé
- Layout: Front-engine, front-wheel-drive Front-engine, four-wheel-drive
- Platform: Mitsubishi/Chrysler D platform
- Related: Mitsubishi Galant; Eagle Talon; Plymouth Laser

Powertrain
- Engine: 1.8 L 4G37 I4; 2.0 L 4G63 I4; 2.0 L 4G63T turbo I4
- Transmission: F5M22 manual w/o Turbo (FWD); F5M33 manual Turbo (FWD); W5M33 manual Turbo (AWD); KM175-5/F4A22-1 manual/automatic w/o Turbo (FWD); F4A33-1 automatic Turbo (FWD); 4-speed automatic (AWD)

Dimensions
- Wheelbase: 2,470 mm (97.2 in)
- Length: 4,390 mm (172.8 in)
- Width: 1,695 mm (66.7 in)
- Height: 1,310 mm (51.4 in); GSX: 1,300 mm (52 in)
- Curb weight: Base: 1,145 kg (2,524 lb); GS Turbo: 1,245 kg (2,745 lb); GSX: 1,404 kg (3,095 lb)

=== Overview ===
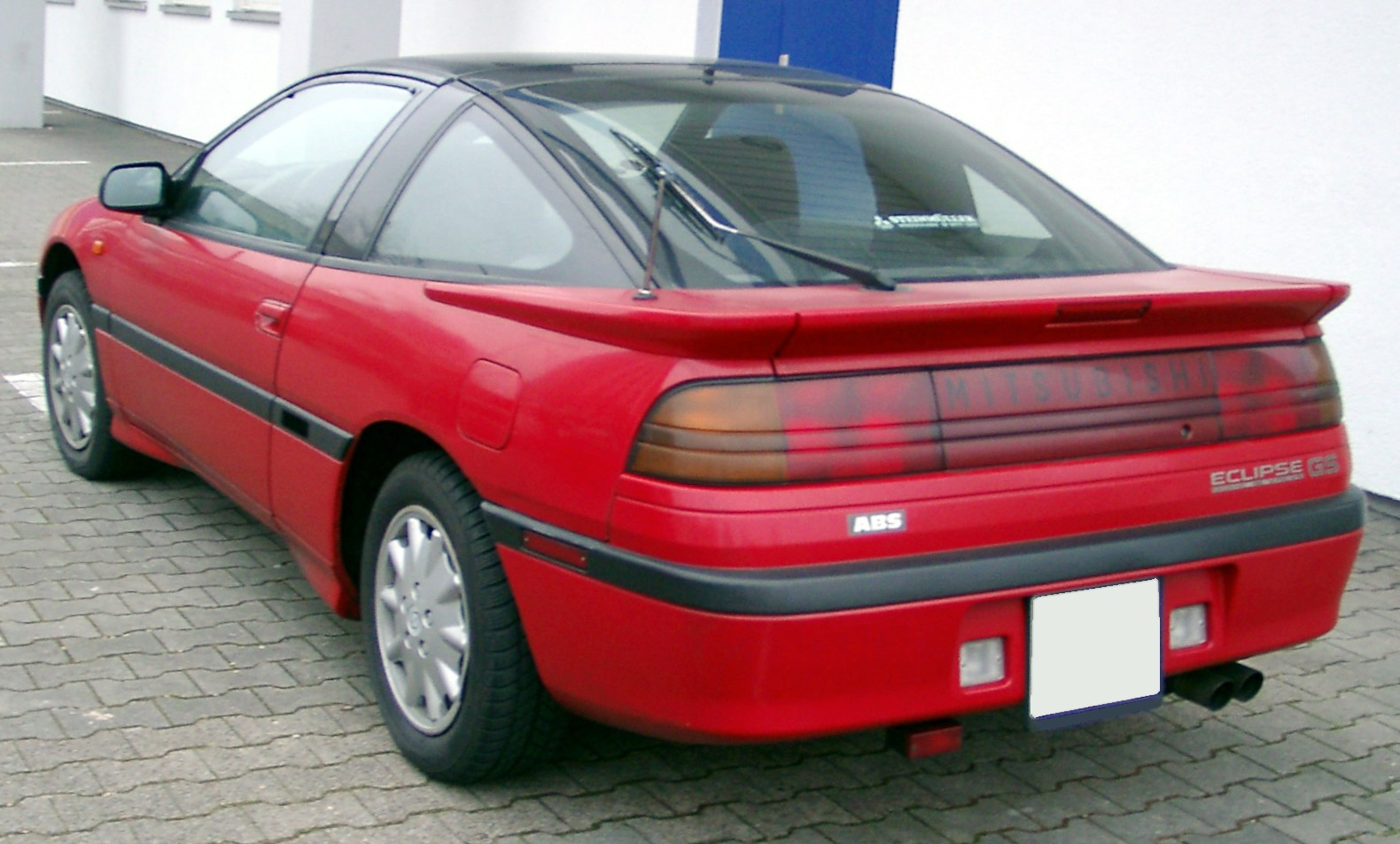
Pre-facelift Mitsubishi Eclipse GS

The first-generation Mitsubishi Eclipse was marketed as an entry to the mid-level four-cylinder sports coupe segment. It was developed for the North American market, where sales began in the autumn of 1989. Japanese sales of cars imported from Illinois began in 1990, and in late 1991 limited European sales began. At first, the car was only sold in Austria, Sweden, and Switzerland, but other countries were gradually added. Five trim levels were available; all were front-wheel drive except the GSX which was all-wheel drive. The GS Turbo and GSX were equipped with turbocharged engines.

The profile was low and sleek; the hood line was so low that it needed a bump to clear the engine's cam cover. The first-generation Eclipse underwent minor styling changes during its production; the car received updated, more ovoid sheet metal for 1992. The most notable were the pre-facelift models have pop-up headlights, whereas 1992 through 1994 models have exposed aerodynamic headlights. The original Eclipse was replaced by the second generation model for the 1995 model year.

=== Trim levels ===
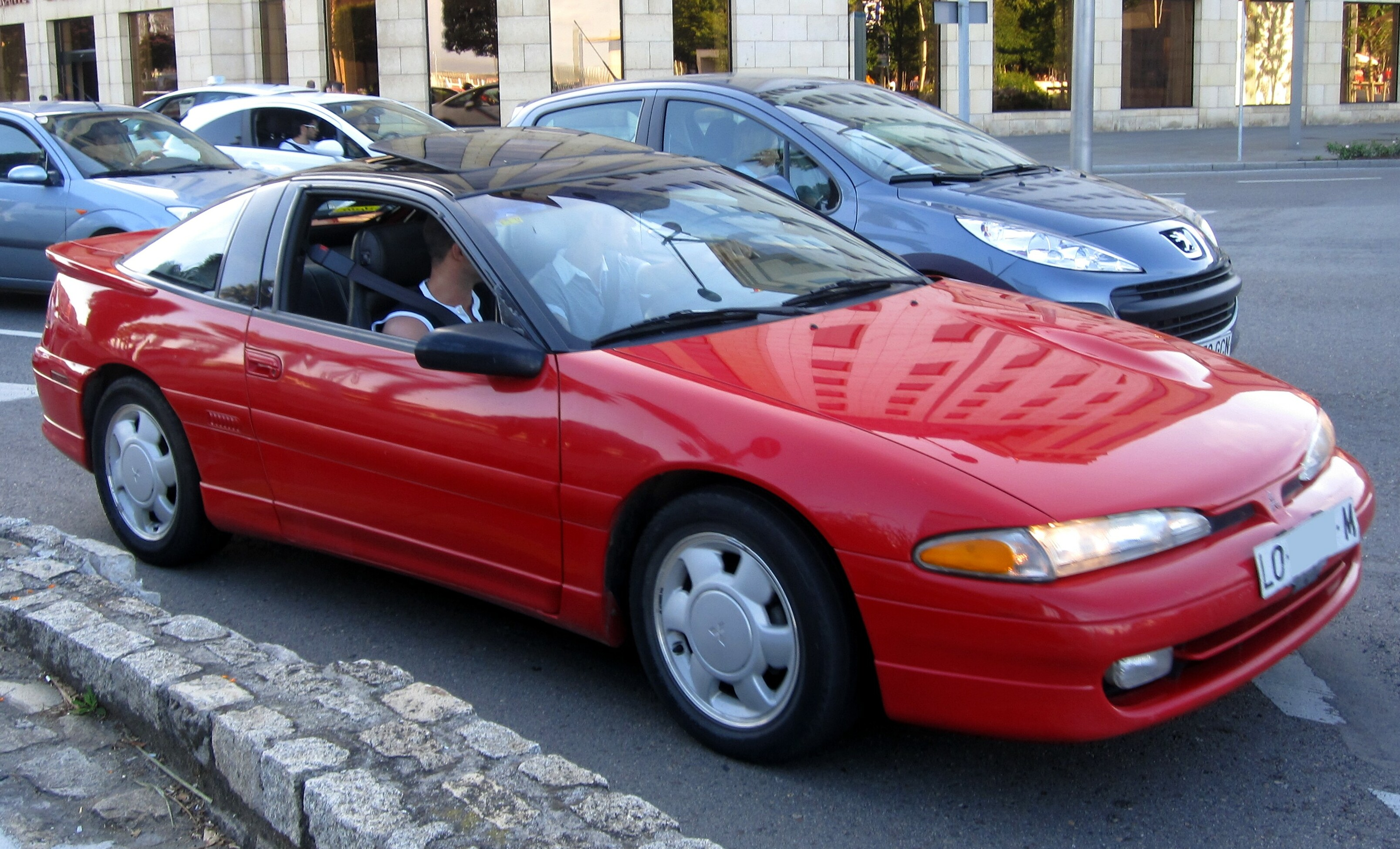
1993 Post-facelift Mitsubishi Eclipse GSX

The Eclipse was available in five trim levels during its first-generation production run. AWD models were not available until halfway through the first model year.

- Eclipse: Base model equipped with a 92 hp (69 kW) naturally-aspirated 1.8 L 8-valve SOHC 4G37 I4 engine
- Eclipse GS: Upgraded model with more equipment
- Eclipse GS DOHC: Upgraded model equipped with a 135 hp (101 kW) naturally aspirated 2.0 L 16-valve DOHC Mitsubishi Sirius engine; a naturally aspirated variant of the 4G63T I4 engine (Note: 1990–1994 model years Eclipse, Talon and Laser did not come with the 420a engine. The 420a was not available until the second generation.)
- Eclipse GS DOHC AWD: Equipped with a 150 hp (112 kW) 4G63 16-valve naturally-aspirated engine (AWD N/A only available in Europe) All were only available with a five-speed manual transmission and without rear limited-slip differential. sunroof, cruise control, anti-lock brakes, central locking, and air conditioning were included.
- Eclipse GS Turbo: Upgraded model equipped with a 180–195 hp (134–145 kW)* turbocharged 2.0 L 16-valve DOHC 4G63T I4 engine
- Eclipse GSX: AWD model equipped with a 180–195 hp (134–145 kW)* turbocharged 2.0 L 16-valve DOHC 4G63T I4 engine

* The 1990 GS Turbo with a manual transmission was rated at 190 hp, whereas the 1990 GSX with a manual transmission was rated at 195 hp (145 kW). This was for the purpose of offsetting the additional weight of the AWD mechanism (approximately 2,930 lbs Vs 2,570 lbs GVW). However, 1991 and later years of both turbo models standardized on the 195 hp version 4G63T. The automatic models were rated at 180 hp (130 kW) due to smaller fuel-injectors and turbocharger.

These models varied significantly in drivetrains and available options, and included some variance in appearance, as higher trim lines added different front and rear fascia panels and surrounding trim, with the GSX model getting a notably different styling package from the others. In the European market, only a single trim was available (sold either as plain "Eclipse", or with GS or GSi badging depending on the importer), fitted with the 2-liter DOHC engine producing 150 PS (110 kW; 148 bhp). Some European buyers could also opt for four-wheel-drive.

=== Powertrain ===
The basic driveline layout of the Eclipse was a transverse-mounted I4 Mitsubishi 4G37 or 4G63 engine situated on the left-hand side of the car driving an automatic or manual transmission on the right-hand side. AWD models have a different transmission which included a limited-slip center differential and output shaft for a transfer case, which drives the rear differential (also available as limited-slip) and half-shafts.

==== Engines ====
The 4G37 and 4G63 engines were gasoline inline-fours. The 4G63 has an iron engine block with an aluminum cylinder head and were equipped with two balance shafts. The turbocharged version of the 4G63 (sometimes referred to as the 4G63T) has a lower compression ratio of 7.8:1 and oil squirters under the pistons for better cooling from extra heat created by forced induction. The turbocharged 4G63 engine received an internal update during the 1992 model year. The engines built from 1989 through April 1992 have 6-bolt motors. Beginning in May 1992, Mitsubishi revised the engine to a 7-bolt design. (Note: The bolts refer to the number of bolts on the flywheel that connect to the crankshaft.)

=== Problems and issues ===
In March 1998, Mitsubishi issued a recall (bulletin 98V069001) for all 1990–1998 Mitsubishi Eclipse GSXs (Note: The recall would also apply to AWD variants of the Eagle Talon and Plymouth Laser.) citing, "Lockup of the transfer case can occur due to insufficient lubrication. The condition can cause a loss of vehicle control increasing the risk of a crash." The dealers would inspect the vehicles for the adequacy of the transfer case oil volume, transfer case oil leakage, and operational degradation of the transfer case mechanism. The transfer case itself did not leak but rather the brass plug in the center of the transfer case yoke would leak. Mitsubishi estimated that 24,275 vehicles were affected.

=== Safety ===
The National Highway Traffic Safety Administration (NHTSA) has determined crash test ratings of the 1G Eclipse:

Model year	Model	Frontal driver rating	Frontal passenger rating
1990	Eclipse	4/5 stars	4/5 stars
1991	Eclipse	4/5 stars	4/5 stars
1992	Eclipse	4/5 stars	4/5 stars
1993	Eclipse	4/5 stars	4/5 stars
1994	Eclipse	4/5 stars	4/5 stars

=== Awards ===
The Eclipse Turbo was on Car and Driver magazine's Ten Best list for 1989 through 1992.

== Second generation (D31A/D32A/D33A/D38A/D39A; 1995) ==
Second generation
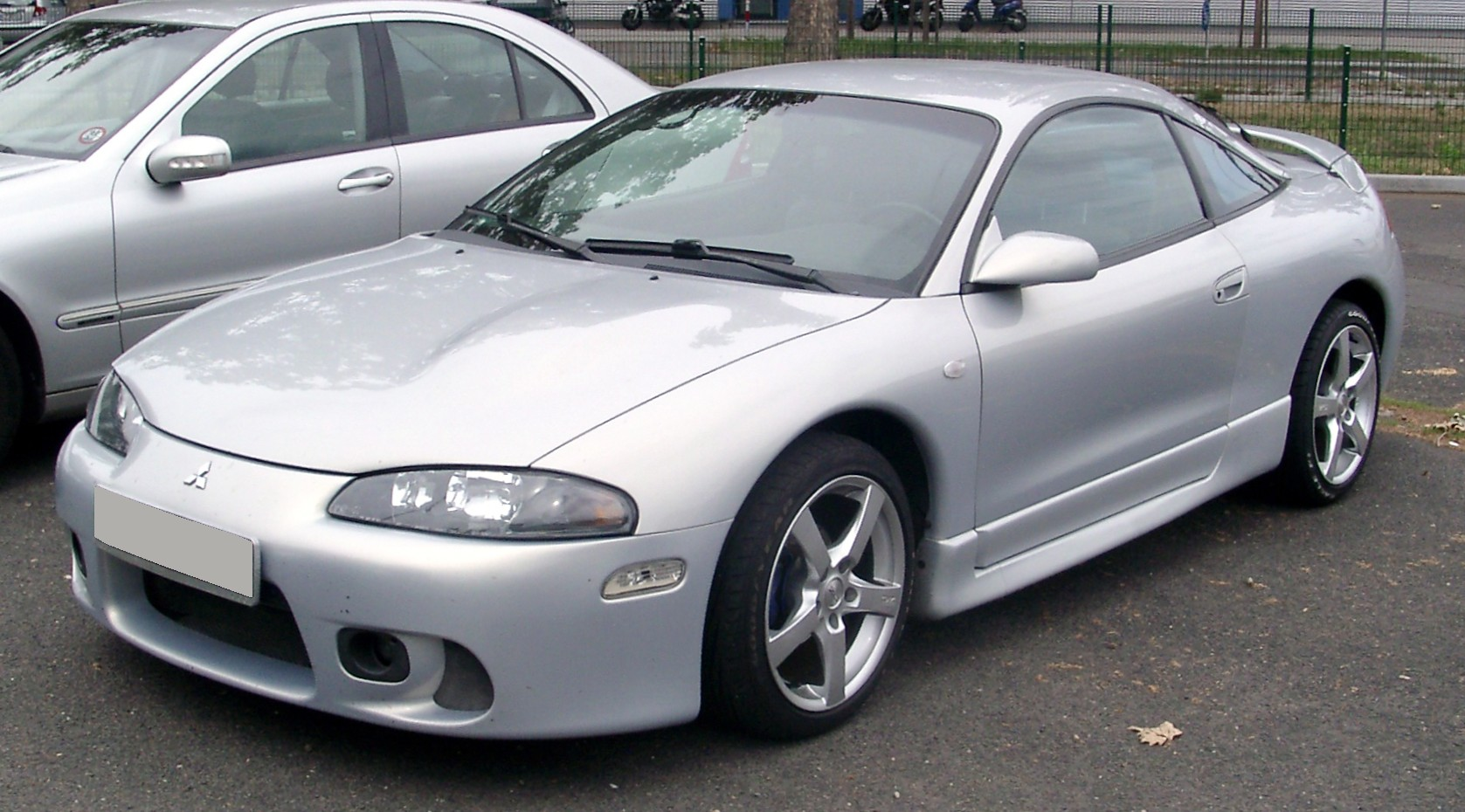
- Post facelift Mitsubishi Eclipse coupe

Overview
- Model code: D31A/D32A/D33A/D38A/D39A
- Production: 1994–1999
- Model years: 1995–1999
- Assembly: United States: Normal, Illinois (Diamond-Star Motors)
- Designer: Dragan Vukadinović; Amy Hiroshige (interior)

Body and chassis
- Body style: 3-door liftback coupé 2-door convertible
- Layout: Front-engine, front-wheel-drive Front-engine, four-wheel-drive
- Platform: Mitsubishi D/Chrysler PJ platform
- Related: Eagle Talon

Powertrain
- Engine: 2.0 L 420A I4; 2.0 L 4G63 I4; 2.0 L 4G63T turbo I4; 2.4 L 4G64 I4
- Transmission: 4-speed automatic 5-speed manual

Dimensions
- Wheelbase: 2,510 mm (98.8 in)
- Length: 1995–96: 4,370 mm (172.2 in); 4,380 mm (172.4 in)
- Width: 1,740 mm (68.7 in)
- Height: 1995–96: 1,280 mm (50.2 in); Spyder: 1,340 mm (52.8 in); GSX: 1,280 mm (50.5 in); 1997–99: 1,260 mm (49.8 in)
- Curb weight: RS/GS: 1,235 kg (2,723 lb); GS-T: 1,305 kg (2,877 lb); GSX: 1,460 kg (3,210 lb); Spyder GS: 1,310 kg (2,888 lb); Spyder GS-T: 1,385 kg (3,053 lb)

=== Overview ===
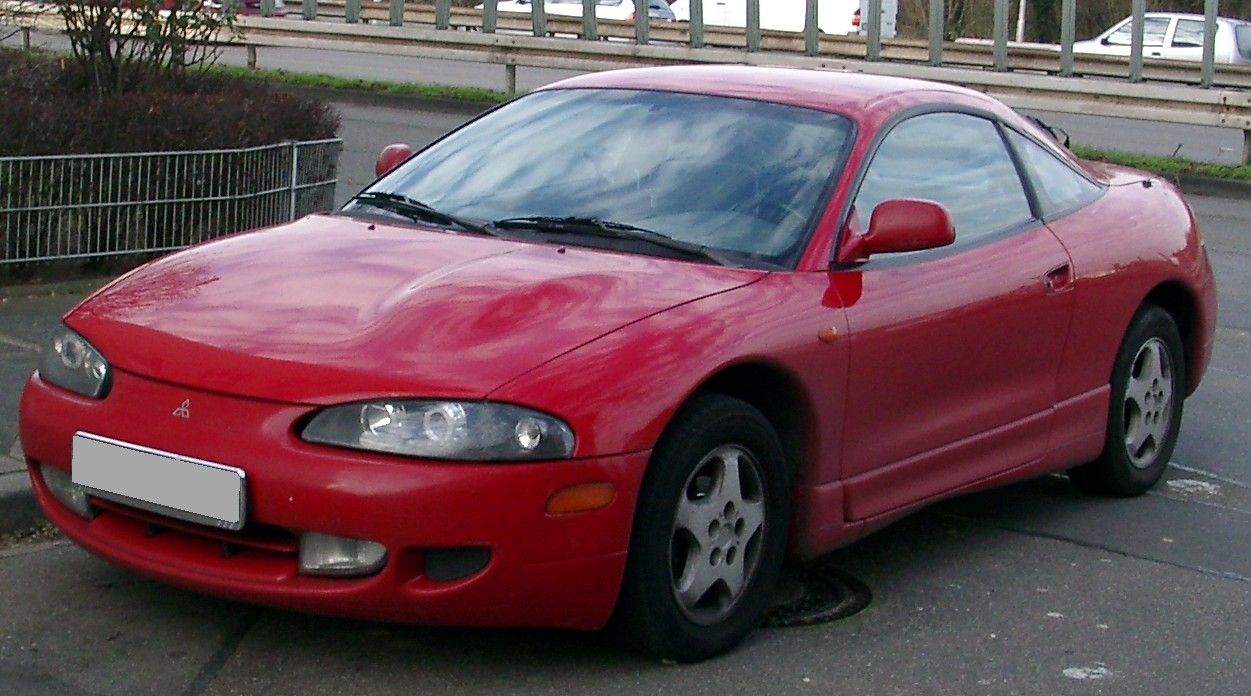

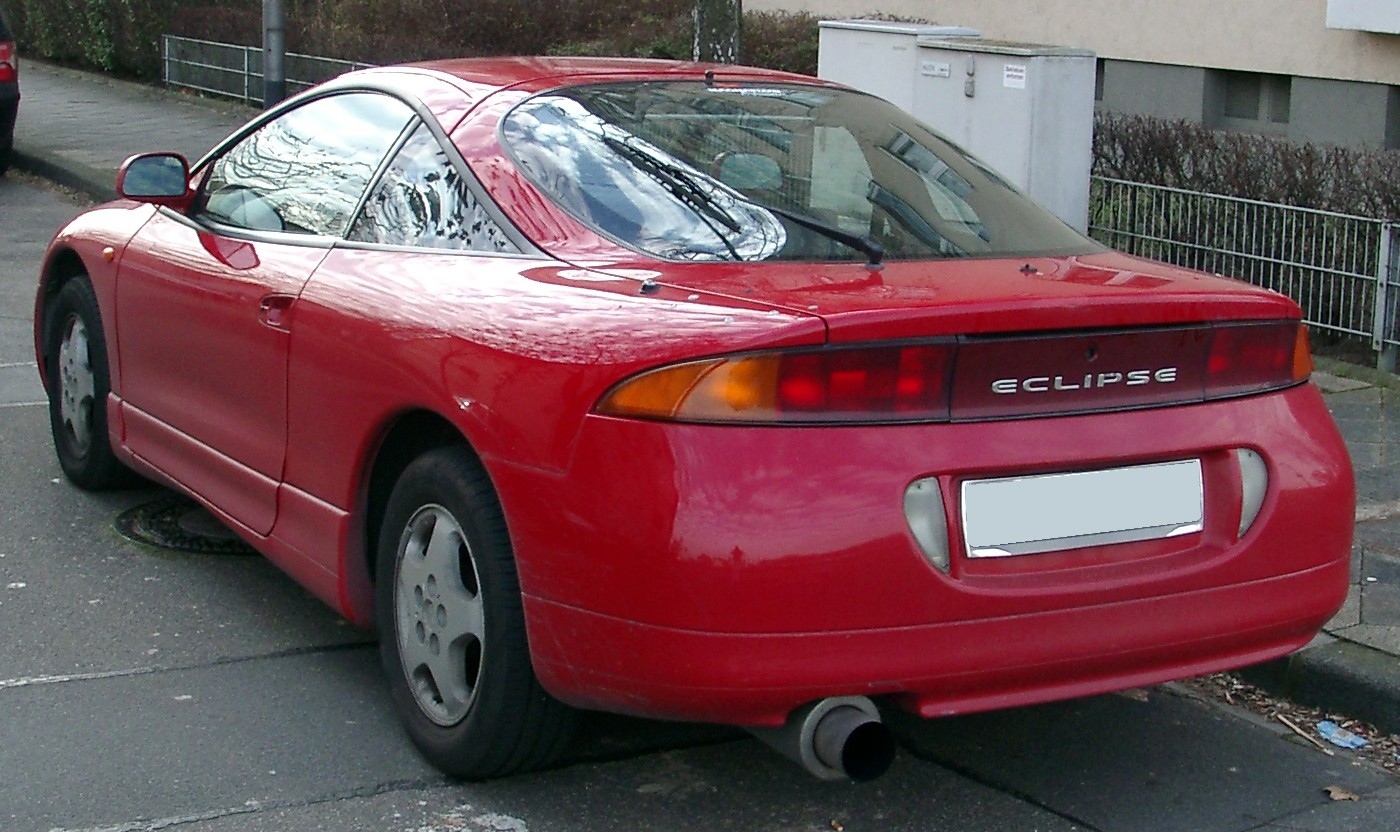
Pre-facelift Mitsubishi Eclipse coupe

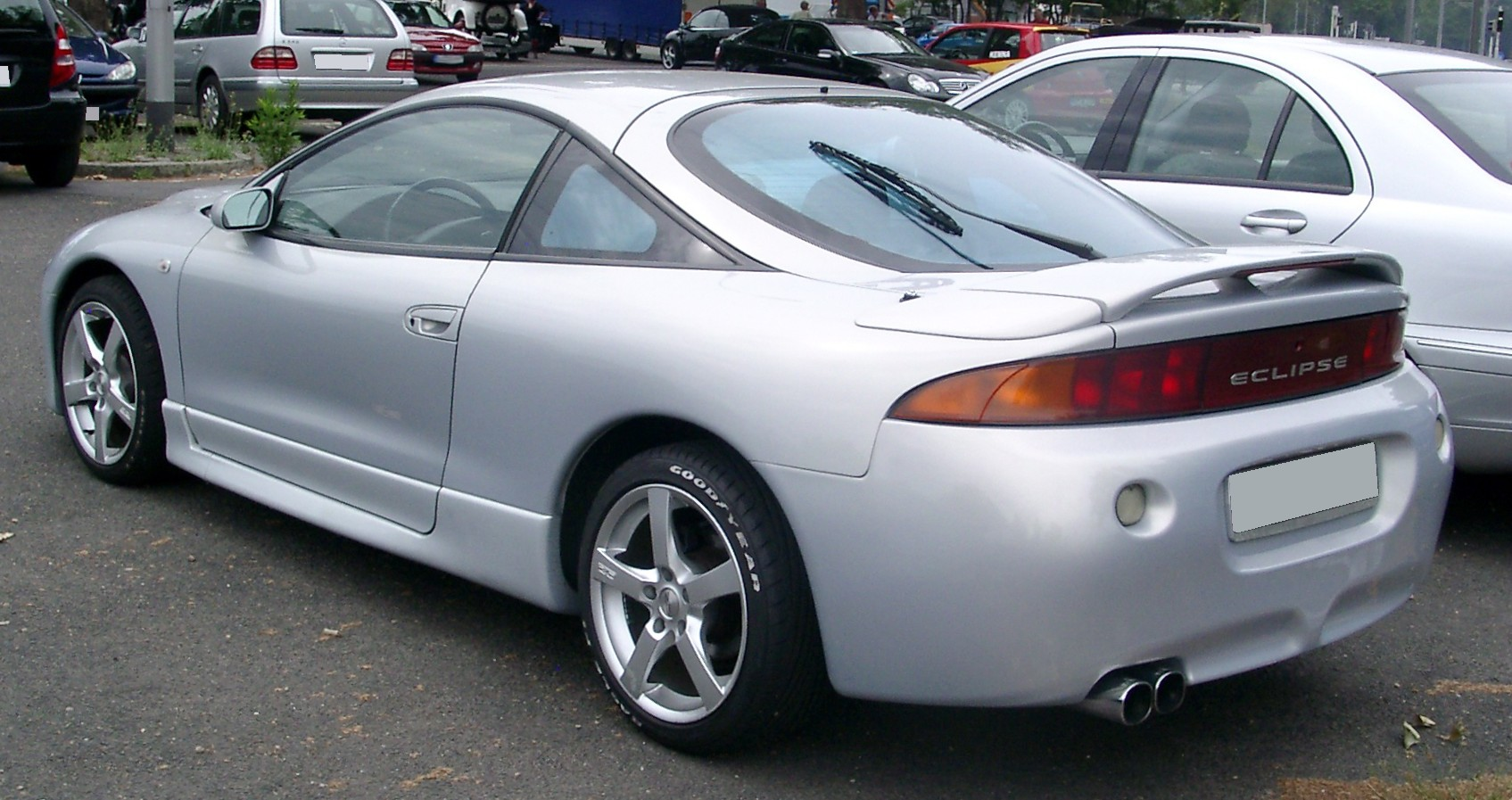
Post-facelift Mitsubishi Eclipse coupe

The Eclipse was redesigned in 1994 (for the 1995 model year) and included standard dual airbags, more rounded styling, a larger interior, and a new engine made by Chrysler for the base model. The second-generation car maintained the market focus of the first-generation car but had numerous changes to appeal to a broader market. A convertible model, named the Eclipse Spyder, was introduced in 1996 and offered in two trim levels; the GS and the GS-T. The Spyder GS was powered by a 2.4 L I4 naturally-aspirated 4G64 engine (in some markets). The Spyder GS-T was fitted with Mitsubishi's 2.0 L turbocharged 4G63 I4 engine. The GSX model was also powered by this engine but with the addition of all-wheel drive system. No convertible model was powered by the Chrysler's 420a engine, nor was there a convertible with all-wheel-drive.

The turbocharged engine option was updated for more power as compared to the previous generation (210 hp (157 kW) vs. 195 hp (145 kW)). The naturally-aspirated cars had two different I4 engines depending on the market. The US version engines produced 140 hp, found only in the RS and GS trims, and were a modified version of the Chrysler Neon engine, the 420A, manufactured by Chrysler and delivered to and installed at the Diamond Star Motors facility. The European market engines were a naturally aspirated 4G63 with 145 PS (107 kW; 143 hp). International market Eclipses made less horsepower than their Japanese domestic market equivalents when equipped with the 4G63 (210 hp (157 kW), 154 hp (115 kW)), due to emissions regulations.

This model exceeded Japanese government's compact car regulations regarding exterior dimensions (maximum width of 1,700 mm (66.9 in)), therefore incurred a more expensive annual road tax obligation.

A special version of the Eclipse, called the "10th Anniversary OZ Rally", was sold at the end of the 1999 model run with unique 16-inch Enkei wheels with the OZ Racing logo. It also included the leather interior package, accented exhaust exit, “silver” gauges, mud flaps, and higher-profile spoiler that were available as standard equipment on GS-T coupe and GSX models. The special-edition package was only offered with the 420A engine.

A unique version of the 2G Eclipse was sold in some European countries. It used a naturally-aspirated Mitsubishi 4G63 motor, similar to what was available in the 1G, unique side-view mirrors, and amber rear turn signals.

A minor style revision was applied for the 1997 model year. The front grille opening was given a more aggressive profile. The headlights were given a sharper slant on the inner edges, and the previous all-chrome fixture interior changed to a black interior with chrome reflector inserts. The driving lights were revised from a reflector type to a smaller projection type. The rear bumper cap was altered and had the reverse lights restyled and moved out into the bumper fascia, away from their original central position by the rear license plate bracket. The GS-T coupe and GSX received a higher-profile rear spoiler. The interior color choices also changed from blue and grey in 1995–1996 model years to black/grey, tan/black, and grey in the 1997–1999 model years. A black leather interior option was only available in 1999; the package included all seats (with the 'Mitsubishi' logo embroidered on both of the fronts), door inserts, and a center console armrest.

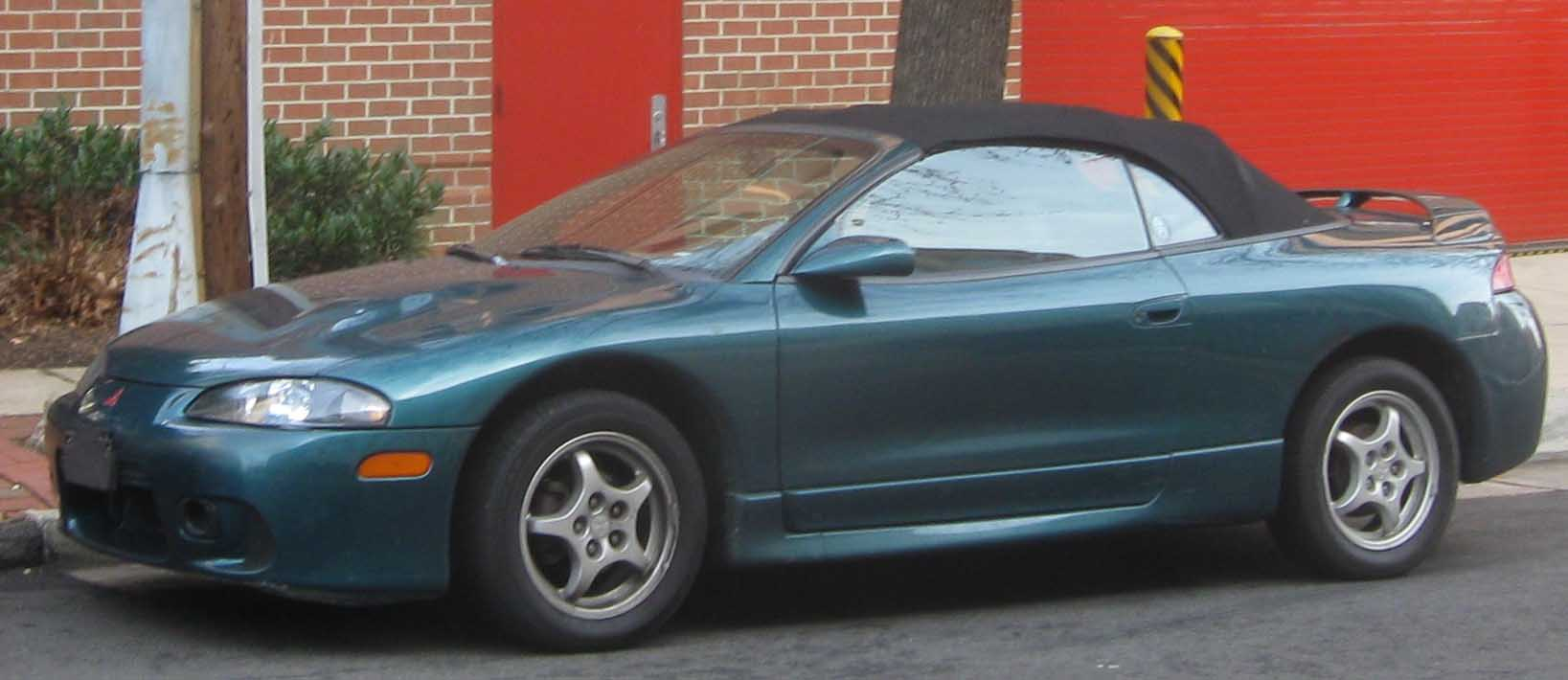
1997–1999 Mitsubishi Eclipse Spyder

=== Trim levels ===
The Eclipse was available in seven trim levels: Base [Only available in 1996.5 (mid-model year)], RS (Rally Sport), GS (Grand Sport), GS Spyder (Spyder models not available in 1995), GS-T (Grand Sport Turbo), GS-T Spyder, and GSX (Grand Sport X=AWD).

- Eclipse RS: Base model equipped with a 140 hp (104 kW) and 130 lb⋅ft (176 N⋅m) of torque 2.0 L 16-valve DOHC Chrysler 420a I4 engine
- Eclipse GS: Equipment upgraded model equipped with a 140 hp (104 kW) and 130 lb⋅ft (176 N⋅m) of torque 2.0 L 16-valve DOHC Chrysler 420A engine. The European variant of the GS had a naturally-aspirated, DOHC 16-valve 4G63 I4 engine producing 150 HP
- Eclipse Spyder GS: Convertible model equipped with a 141 hp (105 kW) 2.4 L 16-valve SOHC Mitsubishi 4G64 I4 engine
- Eclipse GS-T: Upgraded model equipped with a 210 hp (157 kW) and 214 lb⋅ft (290 N⋅m) of torque turbocharged and intercooled 2.0 L 16-valve DOHC Mitsubishi 4G63 I4 engine
- Eclipse Spyder GS-T: Convertible model equipped with a 210 hp (157 kW) and 214 lb⋅ft (290 N⋅m) of torque turbocharged and intercooled 2.0 L 16-valve DOHC Mitsubishi 4G63 I4 engine
- Eclipse GSX: AWD model equipped with a 210 hp (157 kW) and 214 lb⋅ft (290 N⋅m) of torque turbocharged and intercooled 2.0 L 16-valve DOHC Mitsubishi 4G63 I4 engine

=== Standard equipment ===
The second-generation Eclipse was offered in various trim levels. Standard equipment would vary slightly throughout the production run as some items that were optional on certain trims became standard later on. Each trim level came with a standard list of equipment; however, optional equipment packages were also available to add popular and premium features, most commonly found on the GS model. In addition, optional equipment was also available such as a trunk-mounted CD player, leather interior on the GS and GS-T (Note: Leather package on the GS and GS-T was a dealer-installed option.) and HomeLink and other items such as floormats and wheel locks.

- RS: 2.0 L DOHC I4 engine, five-speed manual or four-speed automatic transmission, driver and passenger airbags, power steering, cloth reclining front bucket seats, five-way adjustable driver's seat with memory recliner, center storage console, folding rear seat, map lights, remote fuel door and rear hatch releases, tachometer, trip odometer, low fluid warning lights, AM/FM radio, digital clock, tinted glass, rear defogger, dual remote mirrors, color-keyed bumpers and front air dam, 14-inch wheels with full wheel covers (195/70/HR14 tires.)
- GS adds: 4-wheel disc brakes, 6-way (7-way in 1995) adjustable driver's seat, split-folding rear seat, tilt steering column, cassette player, Power antenna (96–99), cruise control, body-colored power mirrors, door handles and rear spoiler, fog lights, a cargo cover and net, 16-inch wheels with 205/55/HR16 tires (96-99 models), lower bodyside cladding, rear windshield washer/wiper.
- GS-T adds: turbocharged and intercooled engine, engine oil cooler, air conditioning, cruise control, turbo boost, and oil pressure gauges, Infinity 8-speaker AM/FM cassette/CD player with separate amplifier, anti-theft system, power windows/door locks, sport-tuned shock absorbers, 16-inch alloy five-spoke wheels, bright dual exhaust outlets.
- Spyder GS-T adds: variable-assist power steering, sport suspension, power insulated soft top with glass rear window, vinyl tonneau cover, leather upholstery, remote keyless entry, theft-deterrent system, leather-wrapped steering wheel and shift knob, 205/55VR16 tires.
- GSX adds to GS-T: Permanent all-wheel drive, 17-inch alloy wheels with 215/50/VR17 tires (97–99), 16-inch alloy wheels with 215/55/VR16 tires with a manual transmission 205/55/VR16 tires for automatic transmission (95–96), limited-slip rear differential (optional 97–98), power driver's seat (96–99), anti-lock brakes (optional 95–99), leather-wrapped steering wheel and manual transmission knob, leather package, 10.8-inch vented front rotors with dual-piston calipers and vented rear rotors (rear vented only early 95).

=== Powertrain ===
The basic driveline layout of the Eclipse was a transverse-mounted I4 Chrysler 420A, Mitsubishi 4G64, or 4G63 engine. The Mitsubishi engines were mounted in the same orientation as the first generation cars. The 420A-powered cars had the engine mounted on the right side of the car, and further back in the chassis. AWD models had a similar transmission to the first generation car. The second-generation GSX also had a stronger carrier/differential when equipped with the limited-slip option.

==== Engines ====
All motors were four-cylinder gasoline engines. All have cast iron blocks with aluminum cylinder heads. The 4G63/4G64 engines retain the balance shafts for smoother operation, while the 420a does not. The 1995–1999 turbo engines were given an increased compression ratio of 8.5:1, up from 7.8:1, and a smaller turbo, a Garrett T25 set to 12 psi (0.8 bar) in place of the previous Mitsubishi TD04-13G turbocharger (automatic cars) and TD05-14B turbocharger (manual cars). This was done to minimize turbo lag, which was an undesirable trait for mass-market appeal in the U.S. These changes led to increased horsepower and torque vs. the previous 1G turbos. The 2G turbo cars produced 210 hp (157 kW) at 6,000 rpm (205 hp (153 kW) at 6,000 rpm with automatic transmission) and 214 lb⋅ft (290 N⋅m) at 3,000 rpm (220 lb⋅ft (298 N⋅m) at 3,000 rpm with automatic transmission.)

The 4G63T engines found in 1990–1994 models have a 60 mm (2.4 in) throttle body compared to the 1995–1999 models 52 mm (2.0 in). The intake ports on the head and runners of the intake manifold were also larger on the 1G. They also have larger crankshaft bearing journals to allow better lubrication. Because they look similar, it was important to note that the 1990-1994 cylinder head was more on the side of high air volume, while the 1995-1999 cylinder head was more on the side of high air velocity.

Mitsubishi Motors quietly updated its 4G63 engine in 1998 and 1999. The crankshaft was more precisely shaved and cut compared to previous years. It was identical to that used in the Mitsubishi Lancer Evolution, which was not yet sold in North America until 2003. The thrust bearings have been revised to a "split" type to allow better lubrication and self-alignment with the crankshaft. It also had improved tuning and functionality thanks to a new ECU, which was similar to Lancer Evolution ECUs. Although originally deactivated to protect the drivetrain, it included advanced features such as launch control, boost control, adjustable rev-limit, fuel system control as well as fuel and boost map selection for certain Mitsubishi Heavy Industries turbochargers.

=== Problems and issues ===
The second-generation Eclipse received a noteworthy powertrain Technical Service Bulletins (TSB) in March 1998, Mitsubishi issued a recall (bulletin 98V069001) for the 1990–1998 Mitsubishi Eclipse GSX (Note: The recall would also apply to the AWD variant of the Eagle Talon.) noting lockup of the transfer case could occur due to insufficient lubrication potentially causing loss of vehicle control and an increased crash. The dealers would inspect the vehicles for the adequacy of the transfer case oil volume, transfer case oil leakage, and operational degradation of the transfer case mechanism. The transfer case itself did not leak but rather the brass plug in the center of the transfer case yoke would leak. Mitsubishi estimated 24,275 vehicles were affected.

=== Safety ===
All 2G Eclipses came standard with driver and front-passenger airbags, side-guard door beams, front and rear body structure crumple zones, 5 mph energy-absorbing bumpers, safety-cage body construction, 4-wheel disc brakes (except RS), three-point ELR/ALR lap/shoulder safety belts (ELR only for the driver) and height-adjustable front shoulder belts. Anti-lock brakes were optional on all models (except for RS).

The National Highway Traffic Safety Administration (NHTSA) has determined crash test ratings of the 2G Eclipse:

Model year	Model	Frontal driver rating	Frontal passenger rating	Side driver rating
1995	Eclipse	4/5 stars	4/5 stars	N/A
1996	Eclipse Spyder	4/5 stars	4/5 stars	N/A
1997	Eclipse	4/5 stars	4/5 stars	N/A
1998	Eclipse	N/A	N/A	1/5 stars
1999	Eclipse	N/A	N/A	1/5 stars

=== Awards ===
1995 and 1996 "Driver's Choice Award" - MotorWeek

== Third generation (D52A/D53A; 2000) ==
Third generation
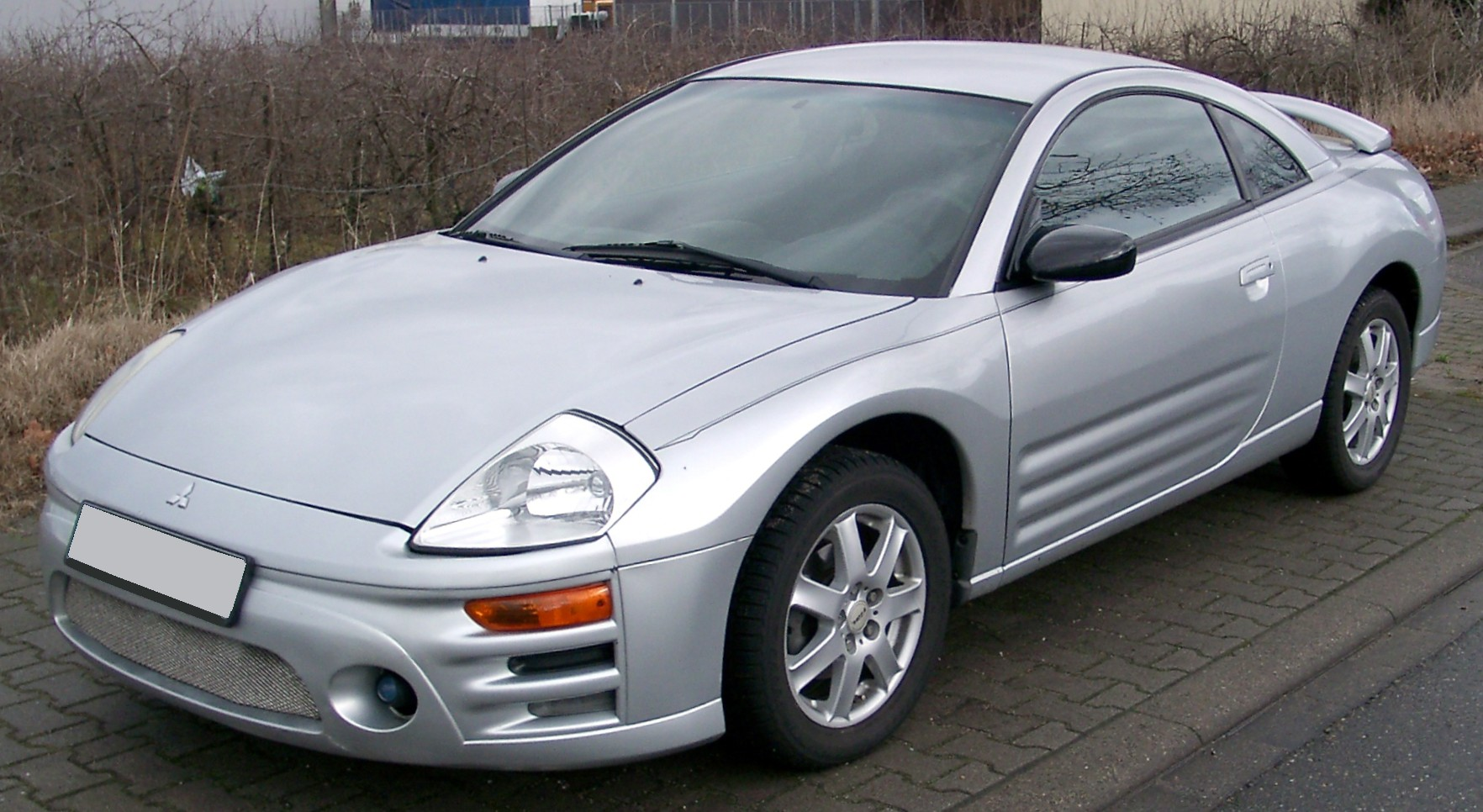
- 2000–2005 Mitsubishi Eclipse coupe (Germany)

Overview
- Model code: D52A/D53A
- Production: 1999–2005
- Model years: 2000–2005
- Assembly: United States: Normal, Illinois (MMNA)
- Designer: Dan Sims (1996)

Body and chassis
- Body style: 3-door liftback coupé 2-door convertible
- Layout: Front-engine, front-wheel-drive
- Platform: Chrysler ST-22 platform
- Related: Mitsubishi Galant; Chrysler Sebring coupe Dodge Stratus coupe

Powertrain
- Engine: 2.4 L 150 hp (110 kW) 4G64 I4; 3.0 L 200 hp (150 kW) 6G72 V6; 3.0 L 210 hp (160 kW) 6G72 V6
- Electric motor: Permanent magnet synchronous (Eclipse EV Prototype)
- Transmission: 4-speed automatic 5-speed manual
- Battery: 95 Ah manganese Li-ion

Dimensions
- Wheelbase: 2,560 mm (100.8 in)
- Length: 2004–05: 4,491 mm (176.8 in); 2000–03: 4,455 mm (175.4 in)
- Width: 1,750 mm (68.9 in)
- Height: 2001–05 Coupe: 1,311 mm (51.6 in); Spyder: 1,341 mm (52.8 in); 2000: 1,316 mm (51.8 in)
- Curb weight: 2.4 coupe: 1,280 kg (2,822 lb); 2.4 convertible: 1,380 kg (3,042 lb); V6 coupe: 1,385 kg (3,053 lb); V6 convertible: 1,470 kg (3,241 lb)

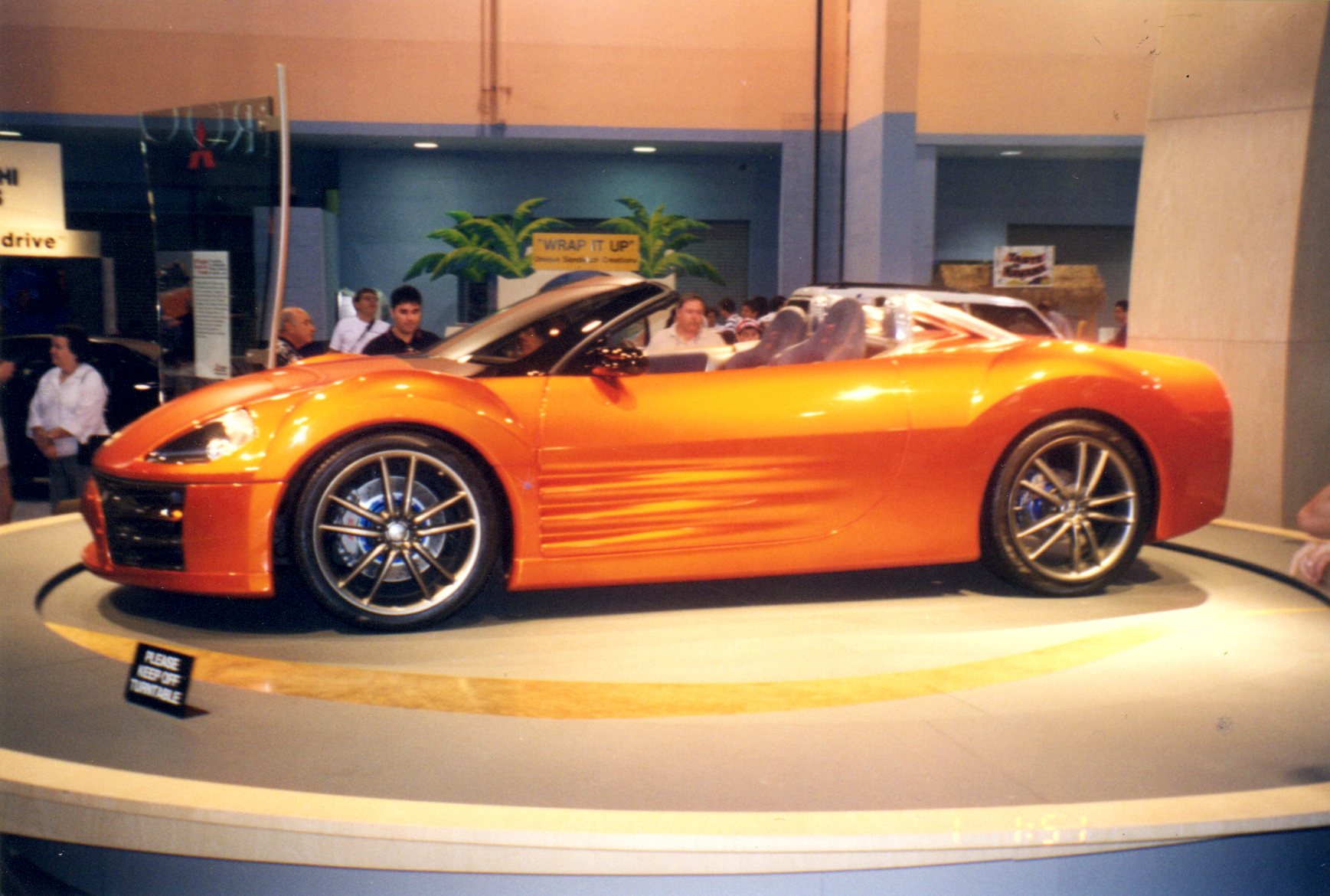
1998 Mitsubishi SST Concept Car

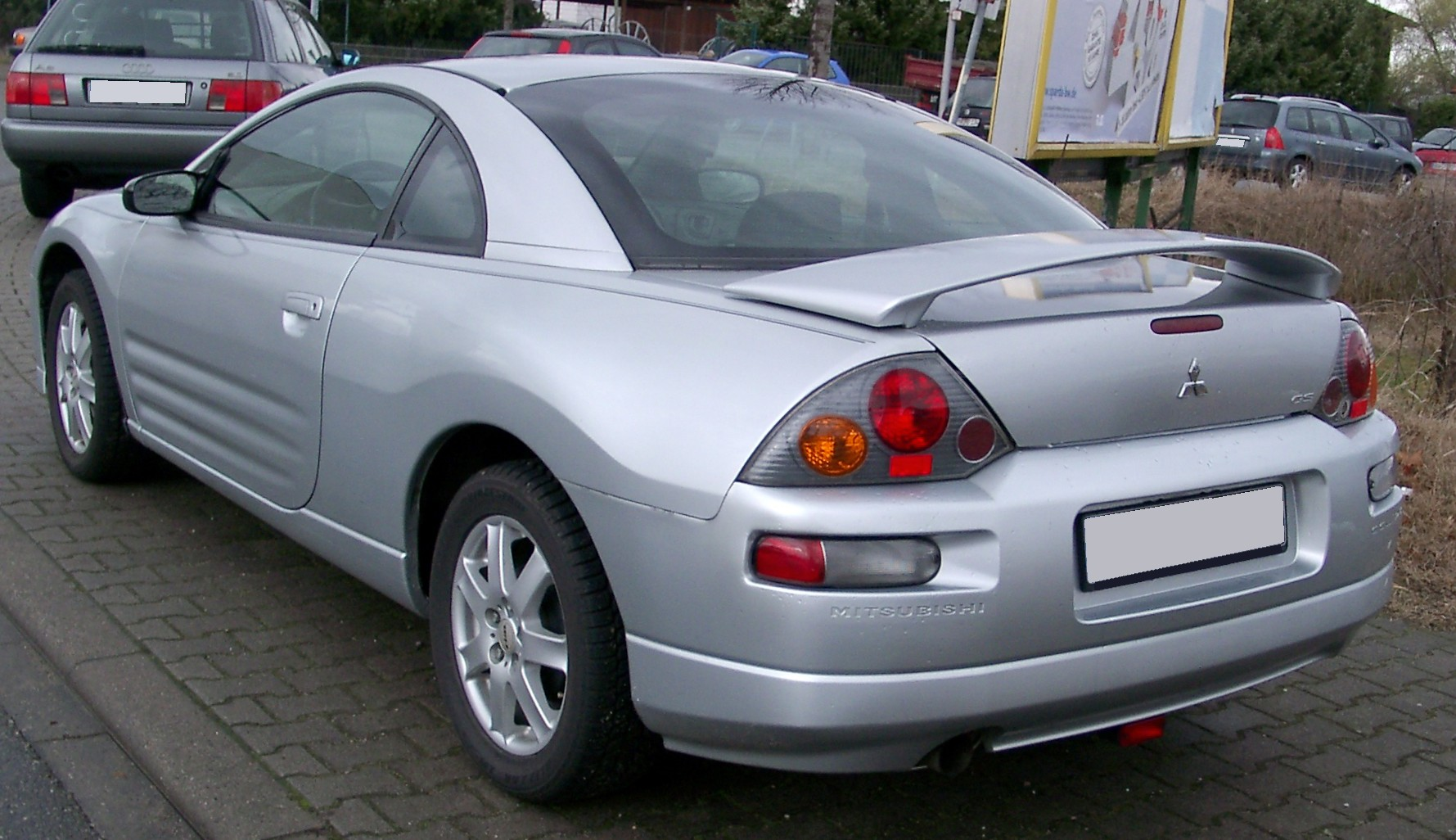
Rear view of 2003-2005 Mitsubishi Eclipse coupe (Germany)

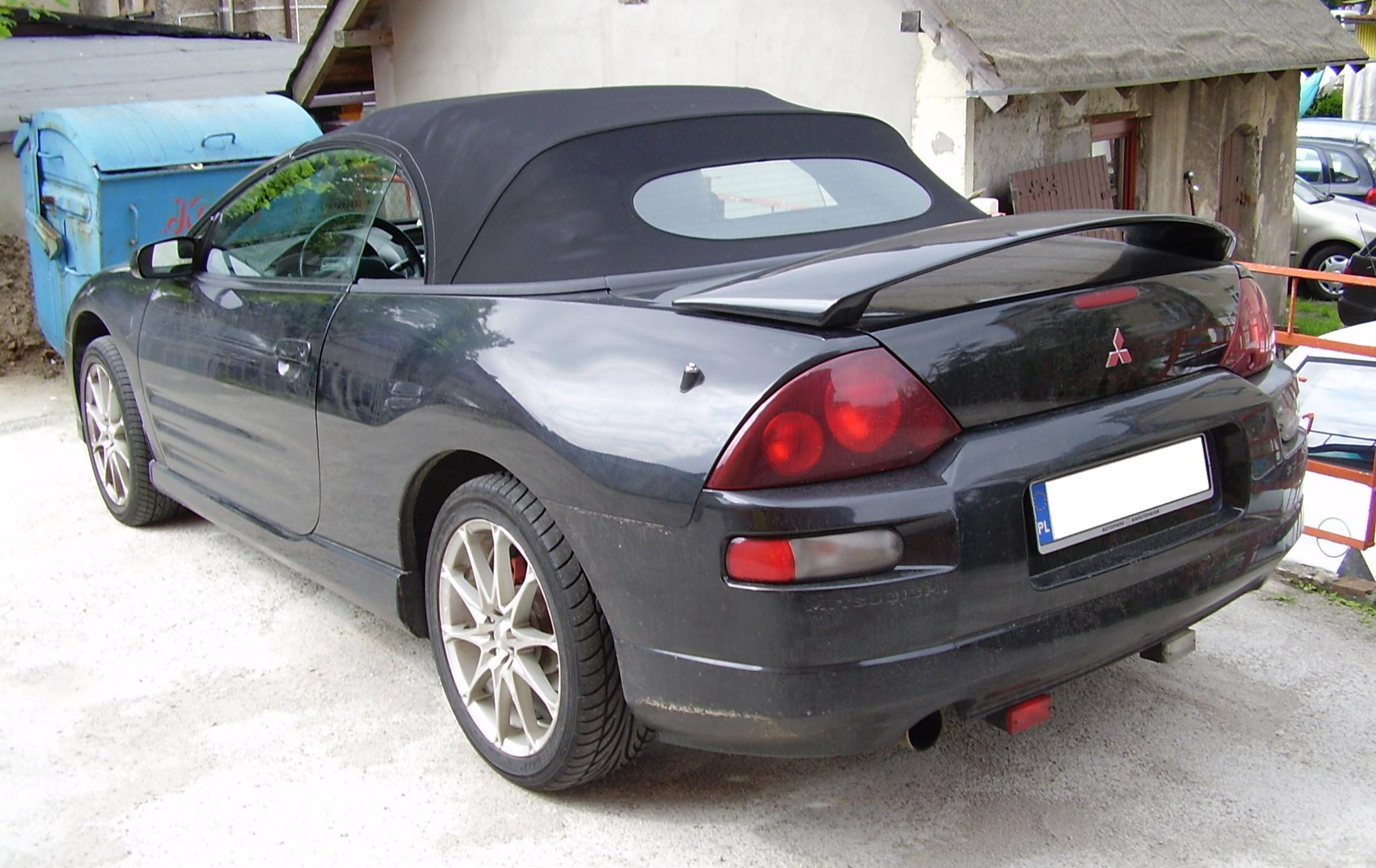
Rear view of 2000-2002 Mitsubishi Eclipse cabriolet (Poland)

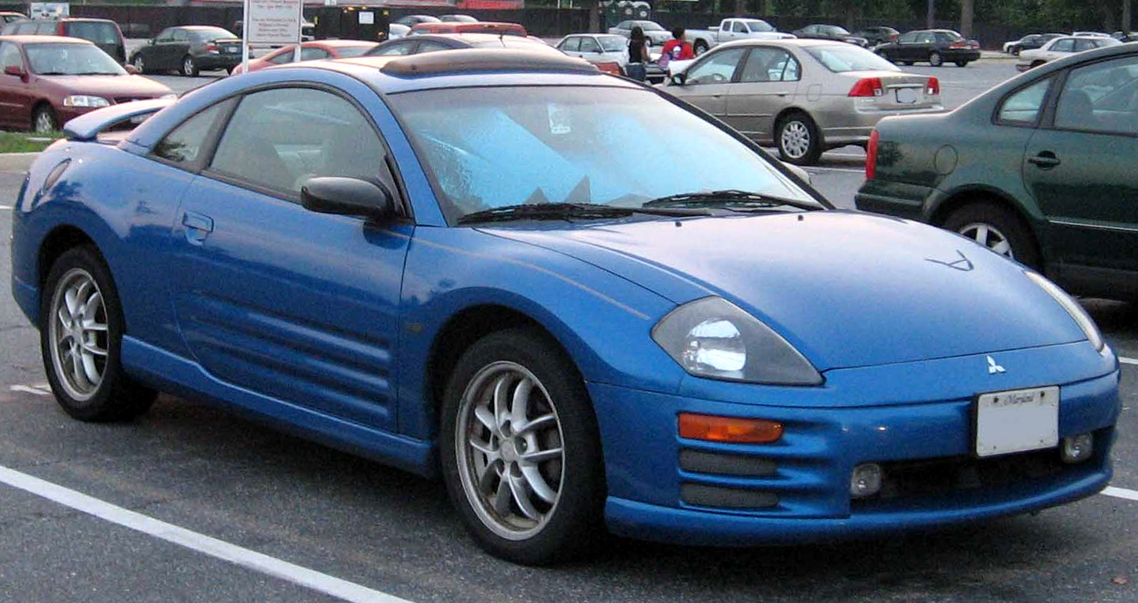
2000–2002 Mitsubishi Eclipse coupe (US)

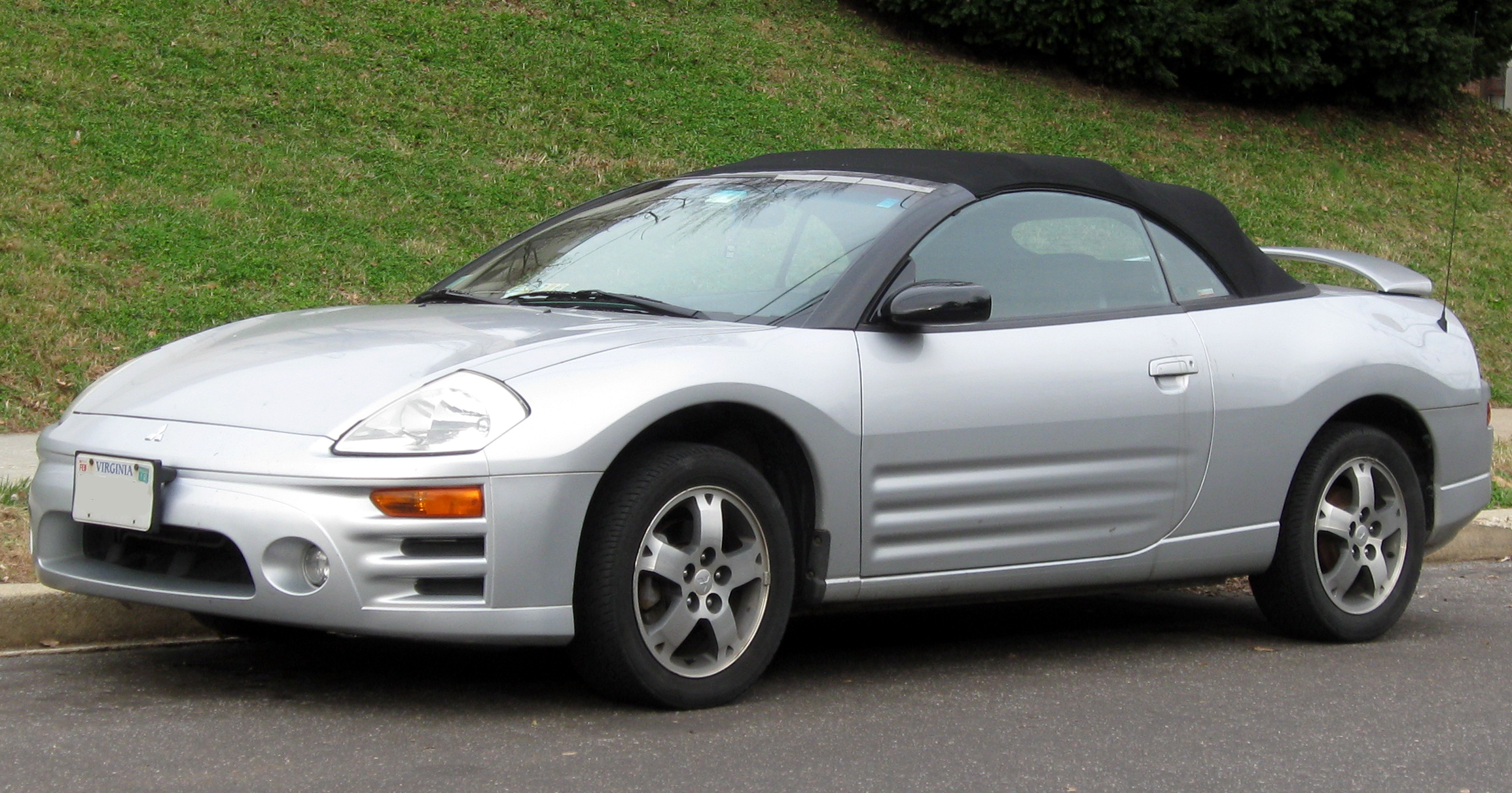
2003-2005 Mitsubishi Eclipse Spyder (US)

=== Overview ===
The third generation was inspired by the Mitsubishi SST design study and was presented at the 1998 North American International Auto Show. It was the first concept vehicle exhibited by Mitsubishi at a US auto show. Mitsubishi called the styling "geo-mechanical" meaning it has a hard-edged industrial look. The car has an unbroken roof arch, a swell in the hood that rolls across the upper fenders, a crease that runs along the car's sides and ribbed contours in the doors and front fascia.

Two new powertrain options were available, a 147 hp (110 kW) 2.4 L 16-valve SOHC I4 4G64 gasoline and a 205 hp (153 kW) 24v SOHC 3.0 L V6 (6G72) gasoline. AWD was no longer an option. The suspension setup was modified to provide a softer and more compliant ride quality.

The third-generation Eclipse shared its powertrain with the eighth-generation Galant. In late 2001, the power of the GT trim was lowered to 200 hp (149 kW) as a result of tightened emission standards forcing MMNA to adopt the California emissions standards for all variants of the car, rather than selling independent 'Federal Specification' and 'California Specifications' versions.

In mid-2002, the GTS trim was introduced for the 2003 model year. This vehicle included an engine with a 10:1 compression ratio, revised camshaft profile, and an improved Mitsubishi Variable Induction Management (MVIM) air intake system that gave the car an extra 10 hp (7.5 kW) and a slightly improved power curve. The 2003–2005 GTS coupe, GTS Spyder and GT Spyder shared the new engine while the GT coupe retained the 200 hp (149 kW) powertrain.

With the introduction of the 2003 GTS model, the Eclipse saw minor changes including a redesigned front bumper with slotted fog lights, as well as a recoloring of the taillights. On the interior, the gauge face changed, and the door panels were also redesigned. Newly designed five-spoke chrome wheels were offered with the GT and GTS trims.

In 2004, Mitsubishi Motors imported the Eclipse Spyder to the Japanese Domestic Market as a special edition.

=== Trim levels ===
The Eclipse was available in seven trim levels: RS, GS, GS Spyder, GT, GT Spyder, GTS, and GTS Spyder. All trim levels (besides RS and the Spyder) came with an automatic tilt and retracting sunroof. All models were front-wheel drive (FWD). The GTS trims were introduced for the 2003 model year. For the 2005 model year, the RS trim was discontinued and a special "Remix Edition" GS trim package was introduced, which included chrome wheels, identifying placards, and the premium interior package from the GT and GTS models, which was not previously offered on the GS trim.

- Eclipse RS: Base model equipped with a 154 hp (115 kW) 2.4 L 16-valve SOHC Mitsubishi 4G64 engine; automatic RS models were only 3G Eclipse without Mitsubishi's "sportronic" select-shift option
- Eclipse GS: Upgraded model equipped with a 154 hp (115 kW) 2.4 L 16-valve SOHC Mitsubishi 4G64 engine
- Eclipse GS Spyder: Convertible model equipped with a 154 hp (115 kW) 2.4 L 16-valve SOHC Mitsubishi 4G64 engine
- Eclipse GT: Upgraded model equipped with a 200 hp (149 kW) 3.0 L 24-valve SOHC Mitsubishi 6G72 engine
- Eclipse GT Spyder: 2000-2002: convertible model equipped with a 200 hp (149 kW) 3.0 L 24-valve SOHC Mitsubishi 6G72 engine. 2003-2005: convertible FWD model equipped with a 210 hp (157 kW) 3.0 L 24-valve SOHC Mitsubishi 6G72 engine with MVIM
- Eclipse GTS: Upgraded model equipped with a 210 hp (157 kW) 3.0 L 24-valve SOHC Mitsubishi 6G72 engine with Mitsubishi Variable Induction Management (MVIM)
- Eclipse GTS Spyder: Convertible model equipped with a 210 hp (157 kW) 3.0 L 24-valve SOHC Mitsubishi 6G72 engine with MVIM

=== Engines ===
The third-generation Eclipse utilized two distinct Mitsubishi engines: The SOHC 4G64 2.4 L 16-valve four-cylinder gasoline and SOHC 6G72 3.0 L 24-valve V6 gasoline. Both engines use cast iron blocks with aluminum cylinder heads. The four-cylinder, found in the RS, GS, and GS Spyder trims, used a 9:1 compression ratio and produced an output of 154 hp (115 kW) and 163 lb⋅ft (221 N⋅m) of torque throughout all years.

The 3.0 L, however, used in GT and GT Spyder models, produced 205 hp (153 kW) in Federal Specifications between 2000-2001 and 200 hp (149 kW) in all GT models in California Specifications, all years with a static compression ratio of 9:1. In 2003, the 3.0 L V6 was improved for the GTS and GT/GTS Spyder, using a revised camshaft profile, raised compression ratio of 10:1 and variable-length MVIM intake manifold. This engine produced 210 hp (157 kW).

=== Safety ===
The National Highway Traffic Safety Administration (NHTSA) has determined crash test ratings of Eclipse of different model years:

Model year	Model	Type	Frontal driver rating	Frontal passenger rating	Side driver rating	4x2 Rollover
2002	Eclipse	2-DR	4/5 stars	4/5 stars	5/5 stars	5/5 stars
2003	Eclipse	2-DR	4/5 stars	4/5 stars	3/5 stars	5/5 stars
2004	Eclipse	2-DR	4/5 stars	4/5 stars	3/5 stars	N/A
2005	Eclipse	2-DR	4/5 stars	4/5 stars	3/5 stars	N/A

=== 2001 Mitsubishi Eclipse EV ===
The Mitsubishi Eclipse EV was a prototype electric vehicle with a lightweight electric motor and lithium-ion batteries in the chassis of a third-generation Eclipse. It was powered by manganese lithium-ion batteries made by Japan Storage Battery, which have 65% reduced charging time over nickel-hydrogen batteries.

The prototype model participated in the 2001 Shikoku EV Rally, a 780 km (485 mi) circuit around the perimeter of Shikoku, Japan, where it drove in excess of 400 km (249 mi) on a single battery charge.

== Fourth generation (DK2A/DK4A; 2006) ==
Fourth generation
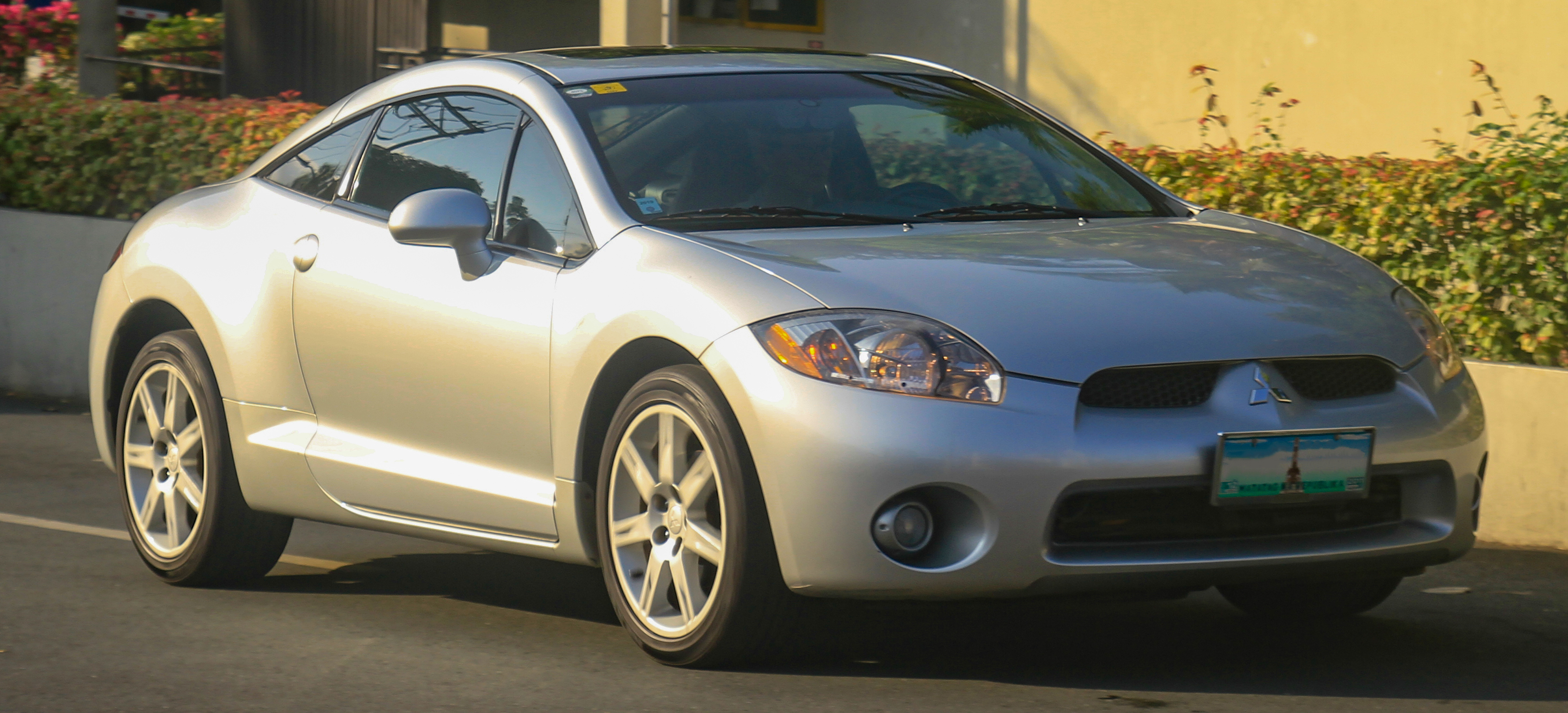
- Mitsubishi Eclipse 3.8 GT V6 (DK4A)

Overview
- Model code: DK2A/DK4A
- Production: 2005–2012; 2007–2012 (Spyder)
- Model years: 2006–2012; 2007–2012 (Spyder)
- Assembly: United States: Normal, Illinois (MMNA)

Body and chassis
- Body style: 3-door liftback coupé 2-door convertible
- Layout: Front-engine, front-wheel-drive
- Platform: Mitsubishi PS platform
- Related: Mitsubishi Endeavor; Mitsubishi Galant

Powertrain
- Engine: 2.4 L 162 hp (121 kW) 4G69 I4; 3.8 L 263 hp (196 kW) 6G75 V6
- Transmission: 4-speed automatic (F4A4B); 5-speed automatic (F5A5A); 5-speed manual (F5M42); 6-speed manual (F6MBA)

Dimensions
- Wheelbase: 2,576 mm (101.4 in)
- Length: 2006–08: 4,564 mm (179.7 in); 2009–2011: 4,583 mm (180.4 in)
- Width: 1,834 mm (72.2 in)
- Height: 2006–2010: 1,359 mm (53.5 in); 2006–2010 Spyder: 1,382 mm (54.4 in); 2006–2010 GT Spyder: 1,389 mm (54.7 in); 2011: 1,351 mm (53.2 in); 2011 Spyder: 1,375 mm (54.1 in)
- Curb weight: 2.4 coupe: 1,485 kg (3,274 lb); V6 coupe: 1,575 kg (3,472 lb); 2.4 convertible: 1,575 kg (3,472 lb); V6 convertible: 1,665 kg (3,671 lb)

=== Overview ===
Another substantial styling revision was introduced, with the fourth-generation model taking some of the profile from the second generation model but maintaining a front fascia consistent with Mitsubishi's corporate styling features of the time. Drivetrain features include a 263 hp (196 kW) 3.8 L MIVEC V6 engine for the GT trim, 2009 and newer models have 265 hp (198 kW). The GS has a 162 hp (121 kW) 2.4 L MIVEC four-cylinder engine, both derived from the Mitsubishi PS platform family, with which the Eclipse shares many mechanical components. Like the 2004 Galant and third-generation Eclipse, the fourth-generation Eclipse is FWD only, although a concept model has been produced by Mitsubishi and Ralliart with a MillenWorks designed hybrid-electric AWD platform, the 4G63 engine from the Lancer Evolution, and more aggressive body styling with imitation carbon fiber accents. The V6 produces 263 hp (196 kW) and 260 ft⋅lbf (353 N⋅m) of torque.

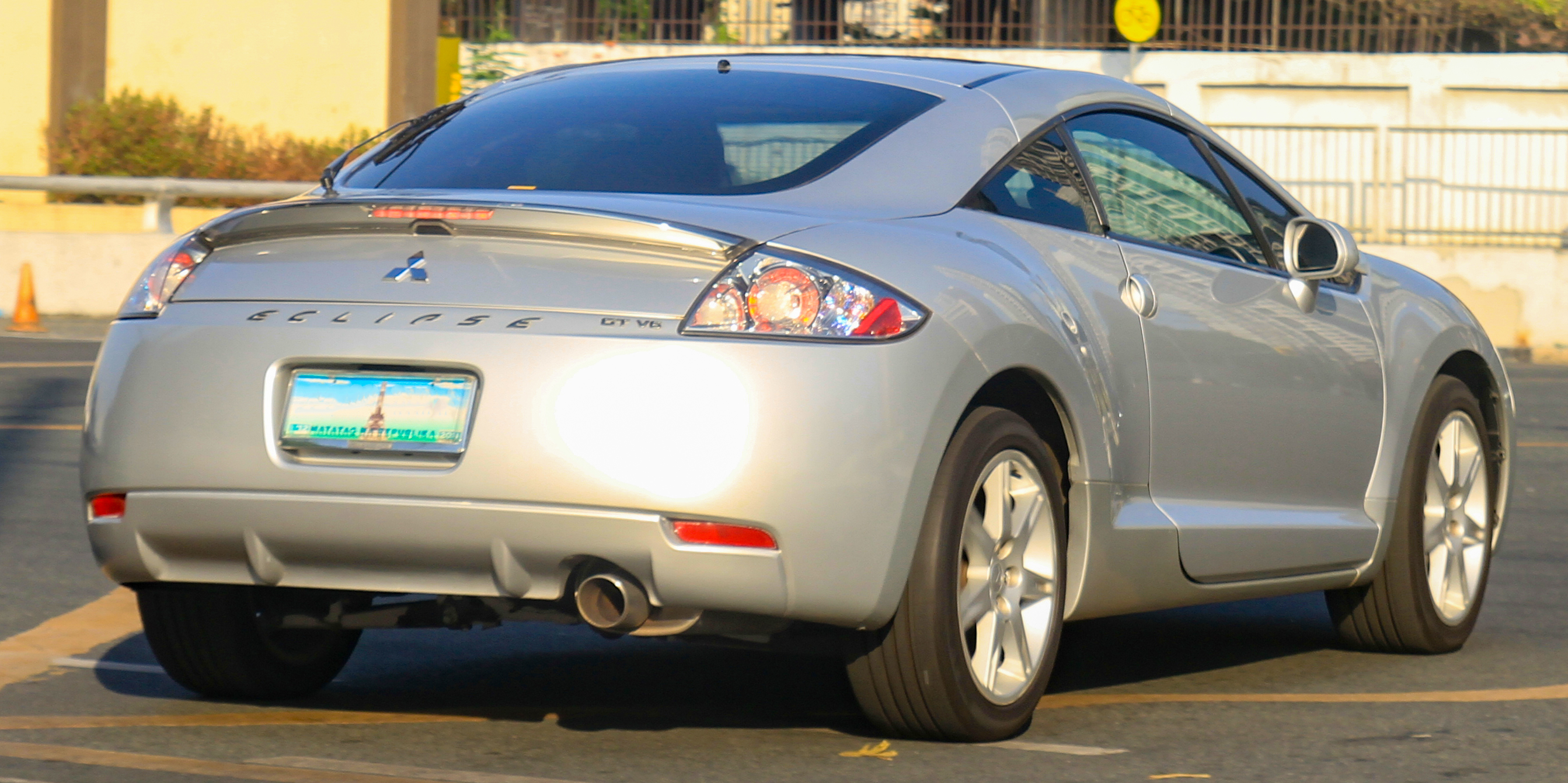
Rear view of Mitsubishi Eclipse 3.8 GT V6 (DK4A)

The fourth-generation Spyder (convertible) Eclipse was released for the 2007 model year at the North American International Auto Show.

=== Trim levels ===
For the 2010 model year in the U.S., its primary market, the Eclipse was available in five trim levels: GS, GS Sport Spyder, SE, GT, and GT Spyder. In Mexico, the GT Spyder is known as the Eclipse Convertible. In Canada, the GT trim was known as the GT-P. The SE package was available in either GS or GT trim specs, however included optional equipment.

- Eclipse GS: Base model equipped with a 162 hp (121 kW), 2.4 L 16-valve SOHC Mitsubishi 4G69 engine.

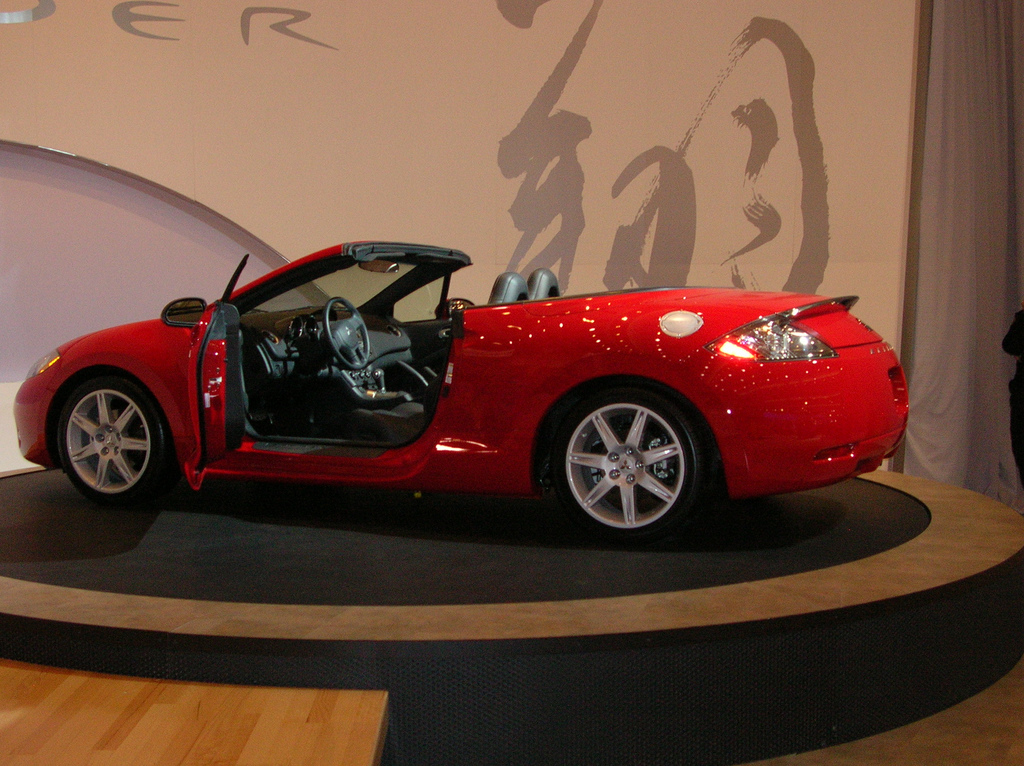
2007 Mitsubishi Eclipse Spyder

- Eclipse GS Sport Spyder: Convertible model equipped with a 162 hp (121 kW), 2.4 L 16-valve SOHC Mitsubishi 4G69 engine.
- Eclipse SE: Upgraded model equipped with either a 162 hp (121 kW), 2.4 L 16-valve I4 MIVEC Engine, or 3.8 L V6 6G75M engine and included additional features including 18-inch wheels, a front and rear spoiler, unique interior options and side skirt decals.
- Eclipse GT: Premium model equipped with a 263 hp (196 kW), 3.8 L 24-valve SOHC Mitsubishi 6G75 engine, 2009–2012 models have 265 hp.
- Eclipse GT Spyder: Convertible premium model equipped with a 263 hp (196 kW), 3.8 L 24-valve SOHC Mitsubishi 6G75 engine, 2009–2012 models have 265 hp (198 kW).

The models and standard / optional equipment:

- GS Standard- Choice of five-speed manual or a four-speed Sportronic automatic transmission, a 140-watt (max.) Mitsubishi CD/MP3-compatible audio system with six speakers, 17-inch alloy wheels, an anti-theft immobilizer, auto-off halogen headlamps, power windows/locks/mirrors, air conditioning, a split fold-down rear seat, two 12-volt accessory outlets, anti-lock brakes, a rear spoiler, and a six airbag safety system.

Options Include - Sun & Sound package with a power sunroof is paired with a 650-watt Rockford Fosgate audio system. Boasting nine speakers including a 10 in (250 mm) trunk-mounted subwoofer, a 6-CD in-dash changer, and steering-wheel-mounted audio controls, the package also includes a central display with outside temperature and compass readings and an electrochromic rear-view mirror.

- GS Spyder - available for sale for the 2007 model year.

Options Include - GS Deluxe Leather Package: Leather front seating surfaces, heated front seats, heated side mirrors, outside temperature indicator and compass in the center dash display.

- GT Standard - Choice of six-speed manual or a five-speed Sportronic automatic transmission, a 140-watt (max.) Mitsubishi CD/MP3-compatible audio system with six speakers, 17-inch alloy wheels, an anti-theft immobilizer, auto-off halogen headlamps, fog lamps, power windows/locks/mirrors, air conditioning, a split fold-down rear seat, two 12-volt accessory outlets, 4-wheel anti-lock disc brakes, a rear spoiler, dual-stage six airbag safety system, traction control, a front strut tower bar, and a center display with outside temperature and compass readings.

Options Include- Premium Sport Package with 18 in (460 mm) seven-spoke alloy wheels, leather front seating surfaces, a power sunroof, an eight-way-adjustable (six power) driver's seat, alloy pedals, heated front seats, heated door mirrors, automatic dimming rear-view mirror, air conditioning, and a 650-watt Rockford Fosgate audio system with nine speakers that included a 10-in (254 mm) trunk-mounted subwoofer, a 6-CD/MP3-compatible in-dash changer, and steering wheel-mounted audio controls.

- GT Spyder - available for sale for the 2007 model year.

Options Include - GT Premium Sport Package: 18-inch alloy wheels leather front seating surfaces, 6-way power driver's seat, heated front seats, heated side mirrors, aluminum pedals, automatic climate control, and a wind deflector.

The Chinese version of the Eclipse was sold between 2008 and 2011 as the 伊柯丽斯 (Yīkēlìsī), a phonetic transliteration of Eclipse. The Yīkēlìsī was only available with a with a 162 hp (121 kW), 2.4 L 16-valve SOHC Mitsubishi 4G69 engine, four-speed Sportronic automatic transmission, and came in four trim levels:

- 炫耀版, Xuànyào Ban, Dazzle Edition.
- 火影炫耀版, Huyng Xuànyào Ban, Fire Shadow Dazzle Edition.
- 炫动版, Xuàndòng Ban, Dynamic Edition.
- 火影炫动版, Huying Xuàndòng Ban, Fire Shadow Dynamic Edition.

=== Engines ===
- GS - Equipped with the SOHC I4 4G69 engine capable of 162 hp (121 kW; 164 PS) in factory trim. The displacement is 2378 cc, with a bore of 87 mm and a stroke of 100 mm. The engine runs 9.5:1 compression. Firing order is 1-3-4-2. It uses 315 cc top feed high impedance injectors with a returnless fuel rail. It has a 62 mm throttle body. The stock exhaust diameter is 2 1/8".
- GT - Equipped with the V6 3,828 cc (3.8 L; 233.6 cu in) with bore 95 mm (3.74 in) X stroke 90 mm (3.54 in) SOHC 4 valves per cylinder 60° V-block 6G75 engine capable of making 263 bhp (267 PS; 196 kW) in factory trim and a compression ratio of 10.5:1. The firing order is 1-2-3-4-5-6. It uses 315 cc top feed high impedance injectors with a returnless fuel rail. It has a 65 mm throttle body. The stock exhaust diameter is 2 1/4". Since 2009, power is upgraded to 265 bhp (269 PS; 198 kW) at 5750 rpm and 262 lb⋅ft (355 N⋅m) at 4500 rpm of torque. The intake valves begin to open at 5° before top dead center, and close 55° after top dead center. The exhaust valves open 51° after top dead center, and close 17° after top dead center. The oil pump is a trochoid type. The cooling system is water cooled forced circulation with a centrifugal impeller type pump.

=== Facelifts ===
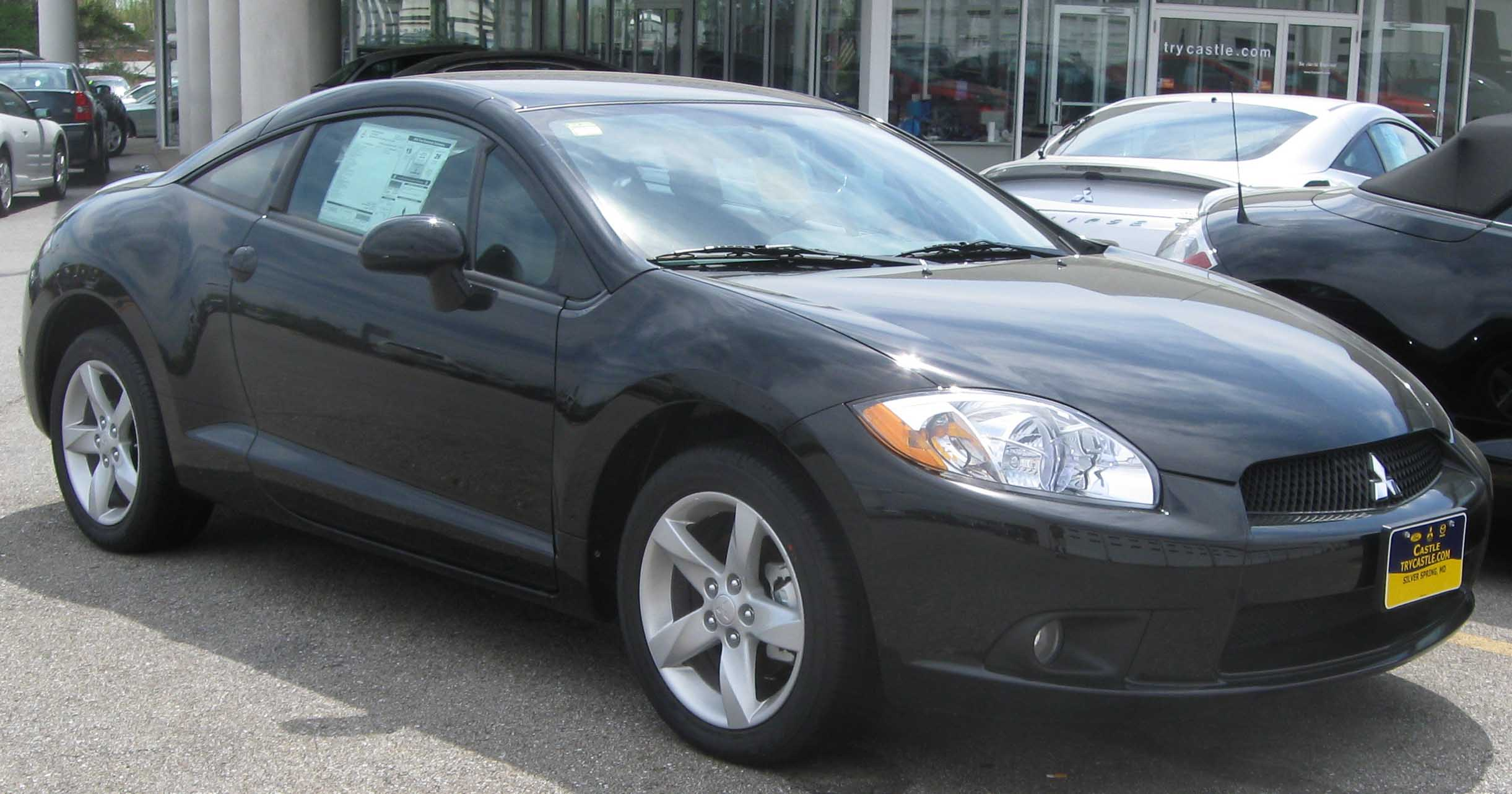
2009 Mitsubishi Eclipse GS coupe (DK2A, US)

The Eclipse received a minor facelift for the 2009 model year, the front fascia changed the fog lights and deleted the triangle housing the "three diamond" logo from the grille; the rear fascia changed the "Eclipse" insignia from an indent to raised silver letters. An option to add a dual exhaust and projector H.I.D. headlamps also became available. The V6 engine were rated at 265 hp (198 kW) and 262 lb⋅ft (355 N⋅m) of torque in part due to the more open front fascia as well as a new stock dual exhaust system. It was unveiled at the 2008 Chicago Auto Show.

For the 2011 model year, the Mitsubishi Eclipse featured a "blackout" roof, similar to the 1990 model. Mitsubishi also lowered the suspension of Eclipse about half an inch to lower the center of gravity. A rear backup camera and Bluetooth hands-free calling to the Sun and sound package were included. In the GS trim, the car gets the same 18-inch wheels and blackout front end as the GT model called the GS Sport.

=== Final model year ===
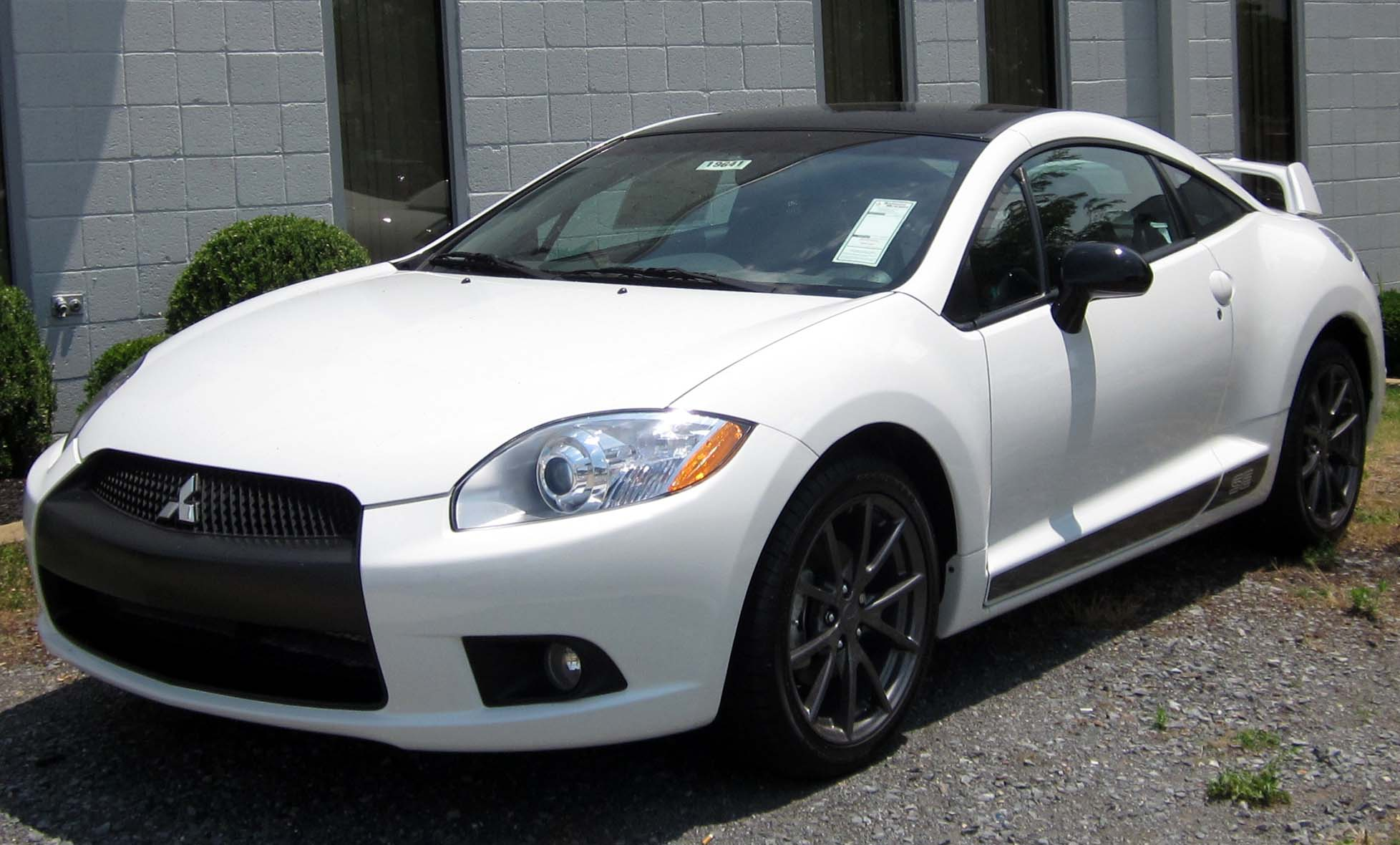
2012 Mitsubishi Eclipse SE (DK2AM)

For the 2012 model year, the Eclipse received three slight changes: brake override logic, a clear lip spoiler on the GT trim, and one new exterior color. According to a review and rating by Motor Trend, the fourth-generation Eclipse was described as "dated" - but its "exterior design still stands out among sporty coupes currently available." The 2012 model year Eclipse was six years old and "is still trying to pass itself off as a sporty two-door." This was the final model year, albeit a short run because production ended in August 2011.

The last Eclipse was manufactured on August 16, 2011, painted in Kalapana Black - a color chosen by Mitsubishi's Facebook community, who picked from a historical Eclipse color palette. This was the only Eclipse equipped with both the 3.8 L 265 hp V6 engine and the commemorative SE package, as well as special 18-inch Dark Argent alloy wheels and one-of-a-kind graphics. It is also built with a sunroof, leather interior, 650W Rockford Fosgate 9-speaker audio system with Sirius XM, hands-free Bluetooth phone interface, rear-view camera, and HID headlights. The car was auctioned off by Mecum Auctions in St. Charles, Illinois on 17 September 2012, for $35,000. Proceeds went to the Japanese Red Cross to aid victims of the 2011 Tōhoku earthquake and tsunami.

Total Eclipse production was 906,876 units.

=== Recalls ===
- 05V247000 - Recalled 6 February 2005, vehicles were found equipped with faulty brake booster assemblies. The brake booster could separate due to improper crimp joints resulting in total brake failure
- 05V299000 - Recalled 27 June 2005, master cylinders were found to have improperly installed seals. Brake fluid may bypass the seal and result in longer pedal stroke, and reduced braking pressure
- 15V337000 - Recalled 6 February 2015, vehicles made between 23 December 2005 and 13 February 2009 were recalled for corrosion issues in the ABS unit. This can cause internal valves to seize, resulting in sudden brake failure or reduced stopping ability
- 08V454000 - Recalled 9 September 2008, certain 2005-2007 vehicles had improper fuel tank mounting brackets which could split. This could result in the fuel tank to come undone in a collision and potentially cause a fuel leak.

== Motorsport ==
The Eclipse has been campaigned in various auto racing events.

=== Rally, endurance and road racing ===
The Eclipse, and its Chrysler-branded counterparts, have competed in Sports Car Club of America (SCCA) events.

In 1995, a GT2 class specification Eclipse GSX was entered into the annual 24 Hours of Daytona endurance race. It was placed on grid number 74, at the back in last place. It moved up to 24th place overall finish without any issues. It nearly set a new record as well, passing a total of 50 cars. In 1998, it entered the race again but was in a lower specification class (GT3/GTS3). It finished in 24th place. In 1999, the Eclipse made its final appearance in the race, achieving 39th place, after posting 455 laps. The name of the team was Spirit of Daytona and their sponsor was Daytona Mitsubishi. Craig Conway, Eric Van Cleef, and Todd Flis were the drivers.

In 2004 and 2005, Greg Collier won the NASA Super Unlimited class national title in a Plymouth Laser RS Turbo. These wins were over purpose-built Ferrari Challenge and Porsche Carrera Cup race cars.

In 2009 and 2010, an Eclipse Spyder GS-T driven by Matt Andrews and Andrew Brilliant won the Super Lap Battle Limited championship in Willow Springs, California.

In 2012, a heavily built and tuned Mitsubishi Eclipse piloted by Mark Rybníček won the Czech Hill Climb championship. Other drivers such as Karel Stehlik and David Komarek have used Eclipses in hill climb competition as well. Some of engines produce as much as 650 hp (485 kW; 659 PS). They also have short transmission gears to accelerate to triple-digit speeds.

=== Drag racing ===
Brent Rau has won three world drag racing championships using an Eclipse; IDRC, NDRA, and NHRA. Many other notable names have also claimed big wins piloting Eclipses for drag racing as well.

Jett Racing entered a third-generation Eclipse for drag racing competition. As of 2014, they hold the world record for the world's fastest four-cylinder. It has 1,600 hp (1,193 kW; 1,622 PS) and is RWD. It is capable of over 2,000 bhp (1,491 kW; 2,028 PS). On 29 November 2018, they ran 6.2 seconds in the quarter-mile with a top speed of 225 mph (362 km/h).

== See also ==
- DSM
- Plymouth Laser
- Eagle Talon
