= Mitsubishi Motors North America =

American component of Mitsubishi Motors

Mitsubishi Motors North America, Inc.
- Type: Subsidiary
- Industry: Automotive
- Founded: 1981; 45 years ago
- Headquarters: 4031 Aspen Grove Drive, Suite 700, Franklin, TN 37067, United States
- Key people: Mark Chaffin, President and CEO
- Products: Automobiles, auto parts
- Services: Sales, R&D, Financing, repairs
- Parent: Mitsubishi Motors (100%)
- Subsidiaries: Mitsubishi Motors R&D of America, Inc. (MRDA); Mitsubishi Motor Sales of Canada, Inc. (MMSCAN)
- Website: mitsubishicars.com

Mitsubishi Motors North America, Inc. is the U.S. operation of Mitsubishi Motors Corporation, overseeing sales and research and development functions. The company manufactures and sells Mitsubishi brand cars and sport utility vehicles through a network of approximately 350 dealers.

Its administrative headquarters is in Franklin, Tennessee, while the Mitsubishi Motors R&D of America, Inc. (MRDA) head office is in Ann Arbor, Michigan.

== History ==
MMNA was formed in 1981 after tensions arose between Mitsubishi and its then U.S. import partner, the Chrysler Corporation, over conflicts in the international subcompact market, leading the ambitious Japanese company to establish its own sales network. The first year's allocation of 30,000 vehicles in 1982 were the $6,500 ($23,019 in 2025 dollars) Tredia sedan, the $7,000 ($24,790 in 2025 dollars) Cordia, and $12,000 ($42,496 in 2025 dollars) Starion coupes, followed shortly by the Mighty Max pickup truck, and were sold through 70 dealers in 22 states.

=== 1980s: Diamond-Star Motors ===
Diamond-Star Motors Logo

The Diamond-Star Motors joint venture with Chrysler in Normal, Illinois, began in 1985, as American-built cars would not be subject to the same restrictive quotas as vehicles imported from Japan. The company sold 67,000 cars in the United States in 1987, but by the time the new factory came onstream the next year, it offered a capacity of 240,000 vehicles. With this new capacity, Mitsubishi made a fresh push to expand its U.S. operation in 1989, increasing its sales network by 40 percent to 340 dealerships and producing its first nationwide advertising campaign.

=== 1990s: Fastest growing U.S. brand ===
1991 was a landmark year for Mitsubishi in the United States. It bought Chrysler's share of Diamond-Star for $100 million, and became the first Japanese owner of a U.S. car rental agency when it purchased Value Rent-a-Car Sales of Mitsubishi-badged vehicles reached almost 190,000. The remainder of the 1990s provided both ups and downs for MMNA. The rising yen and a weak global economy caused a drop in production and profits, but it weathered the storm better than its Japanese competitors.

While its global operations were suffering in the wake of the 1997 East Asian financial crisis, MMNA reported banner results, breaking its sales records every year between 1999 and 2002 and seeing growth of 81 percent to 345,000 vehicles, while the company improved its position in Harbour and Associates' Assembly Productivity Ranking from last to first. At this point Mitsubishi was the fastest growing auto brand in the United States.

=== 2000s: Decline and expansion ===
In 2002 MMNA expanded to Canada and Puerto Rico. Troubles began to emerge in 2003. One of the roots of their rapid growth was a "0–0–0" finance offer—zero percent down, zero percent interest, and nothing per month (repayments deferred for 12 months)—aimed at increasing MMNA's annual sales to 500,000 vehicles. However, numerous credit-risky buyers ended up defaulting at the end of the year's "grace period", leaving Mitsubishi with used vehicles for which they'd received no money and which were now worth less than they cost to manufacture. The company's U.S. credit operation was forced to make a $454 million provision against its 2003 accounts as a result of these losses.

In the wake of this, as well as a Japanese recall cover-up scandal, sales plummeted from 2003 to 2005. New introductions had mixed success, with the Outlander and Eclipse models showing sales growth in 2006, but the Endeavor SUV failing to meet expectations. In 2005, MMNA partnered with Chrysler to introduce the first "imported" pickup truck, the Mitsubishi Raider, based largely on the Dodge Dakota. It was built at Chrysler's Warren, Michigan plant, then shipped to the Normal plant for Mitsubishi upfitting and badging. A new Lancer compact car debuted in 2007, and in an effort to exploit unused capacity at its Normal, Illinois, plant more Galant sedans were produced for the export market. In 2008, Puerto Rico operations were moved to Mitsubishi's Central and South America region division.

=== 2010s: Turnaround begins ===
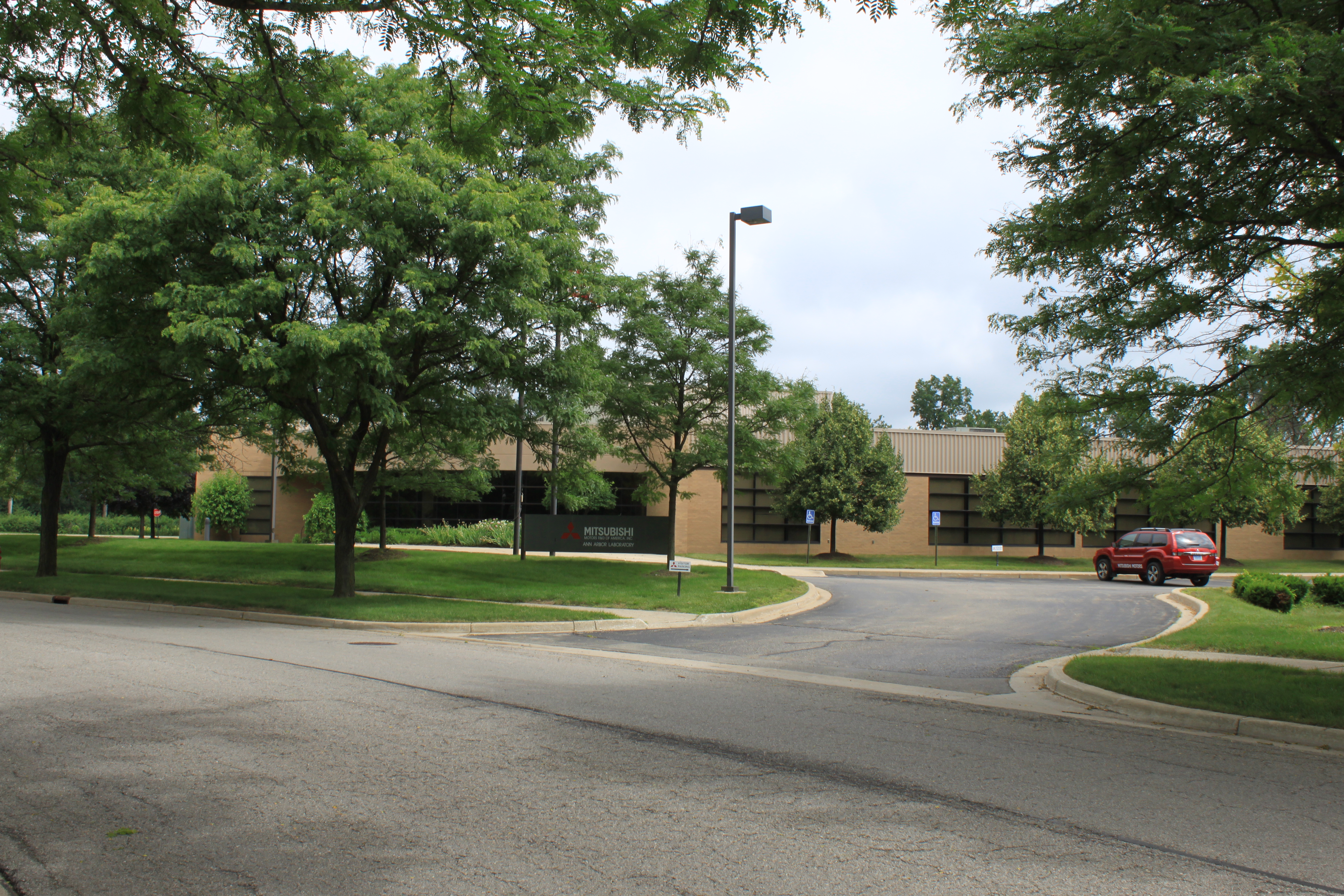
Mitsubishi's North American R&D facility in Ann Arbor, Michigan in 2010

2015 was a record setting year for MMNA, selling five million vehicles to date and 95,342 for the year in the United States, continuing a streak of 22 consecutive months of year-over-year sales increases and a 23 percent sales increase over the previous year. Additionally many changes were made in 2015; MMNA ended their captive finance subsidiary Mitsubishi Motors Credit of America, Inc. (MMCA).

In July, MMNA announced that they would be closing their sole North American production facility in Normal, Illinois, known as Mitsubishi Motor Manufacturing of America, to focus more on the growing Asian market. Complete car production at the plant ended in November 2015; the plant kept producing replacement parts until its final closure in May 2016. Electric carmaker Rivian Motors has taken over the facility. The last model to be built by Mitsubishi in their Normal plant was the Outlander Sport SUV.

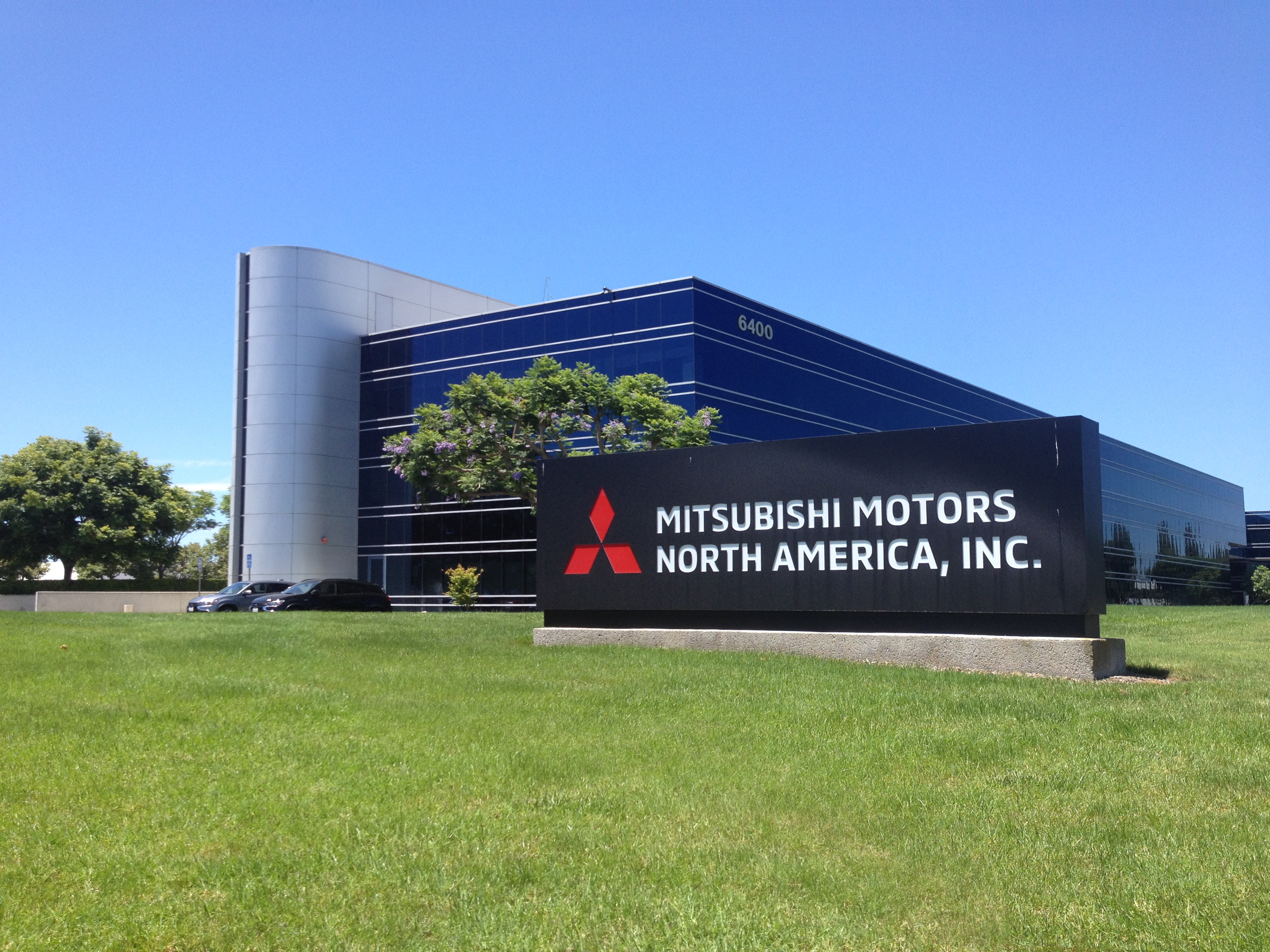
Former administrative headquarters in Cypress, California, pictured in 2019

2016 was another big year for MMNA as the Mirage, Lancer, Outlander and RVR/Outlander Sport were all refreshed in addition to releasing the Mirage sedan (G4). This contributed to increased year end sales, the largest retail sales year ever in Canada and the fourth consecutive year of sales growth in the United States. In Canada the Lancer had the largest year-over-year increase at 9.4% followed by the RVR at 7% and Outlander at 3.5%. In the United States the Outlander drove the largest sales increases year-over-year at 39.5% followed by the Mirage at 3.3%.

On June 25, 2019, Mitsubishi Motors announced it would be moving its North American headquarters from Cypress, California, to Franklin, Tennessee, a suburb of Nashville. Sister company Nissan USA also has its North American headquarters in the city.

In June 2020, speculation began that Mitsubishi may scale back its presence in North America despite sales growth or possibly withdraw altogether as part of a larger Renault-Nissan-Mitsubishi Alliance plan that will see Mitsubishi focus more on Southeast Asia and Oceania while Nissan focuses more on North America, Japan and China and Renault focuses on Europe.

On March 9, 2022, Mark Chaffin was named president and chief executive officer of Mitsubishi Motors North America, replacing Yoichi Yokozawa. Yokozawa, who had occupied the role from March 2020 until March 2022, returned to Mitsubishi Motors headquarters in Tokyo and took on a new regional management role. Chaffin was officially appointed President and CEO on April 1, 2022.

== Sales ==
Year	Canada	United States	Total
2000	-	314,417	314,417
2001	-	322,393	322,393
2002	?	360,149	360,149+
2003	?	237,548	237,548+
2004	10,783	127,359	138,142
2005	10,391	99,600	109,991
2006	10,957	107,640	118,597
2007	16,759	106,719	123,478
2008	18,639	67,910	86,549
2009	19,786	39,970	59,756
2010	19,504	55,683	75,187
2011	20,511	79,020	99,531
2012	17,149	57,790	77,461
2013	21,104	62,227	83,331
2014	22,704	77,643	100,347
2015	21,384	95,342	116,726
2016	22,293	96,267	118,560
2017	22,706	103,686	126,392
2018	25,237	118,074	143,311
2019	25,535	121,046	146,581
2020	16,382	87,387	103,669
2021	23,641	102,037	125,678
2022		85,810	85,810
2023		87,340	87,340
2024		109,843	109,843
2025			

NOTE: Mexico sales are not included, because distribution and sales are handled by FCA Mexico.

== Current vehicle lineup ==
=== SUVs ===
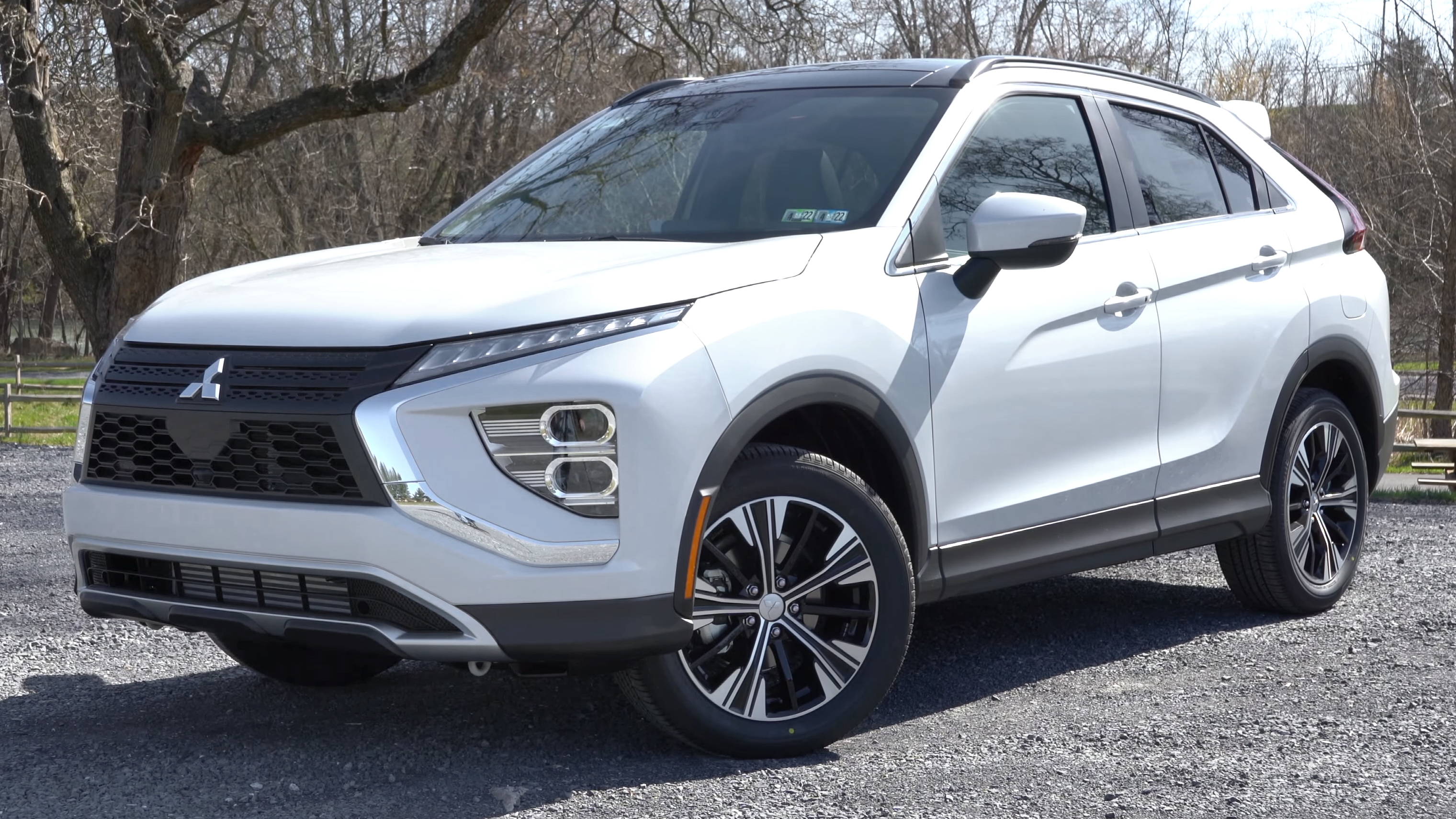
Eclipse Cross

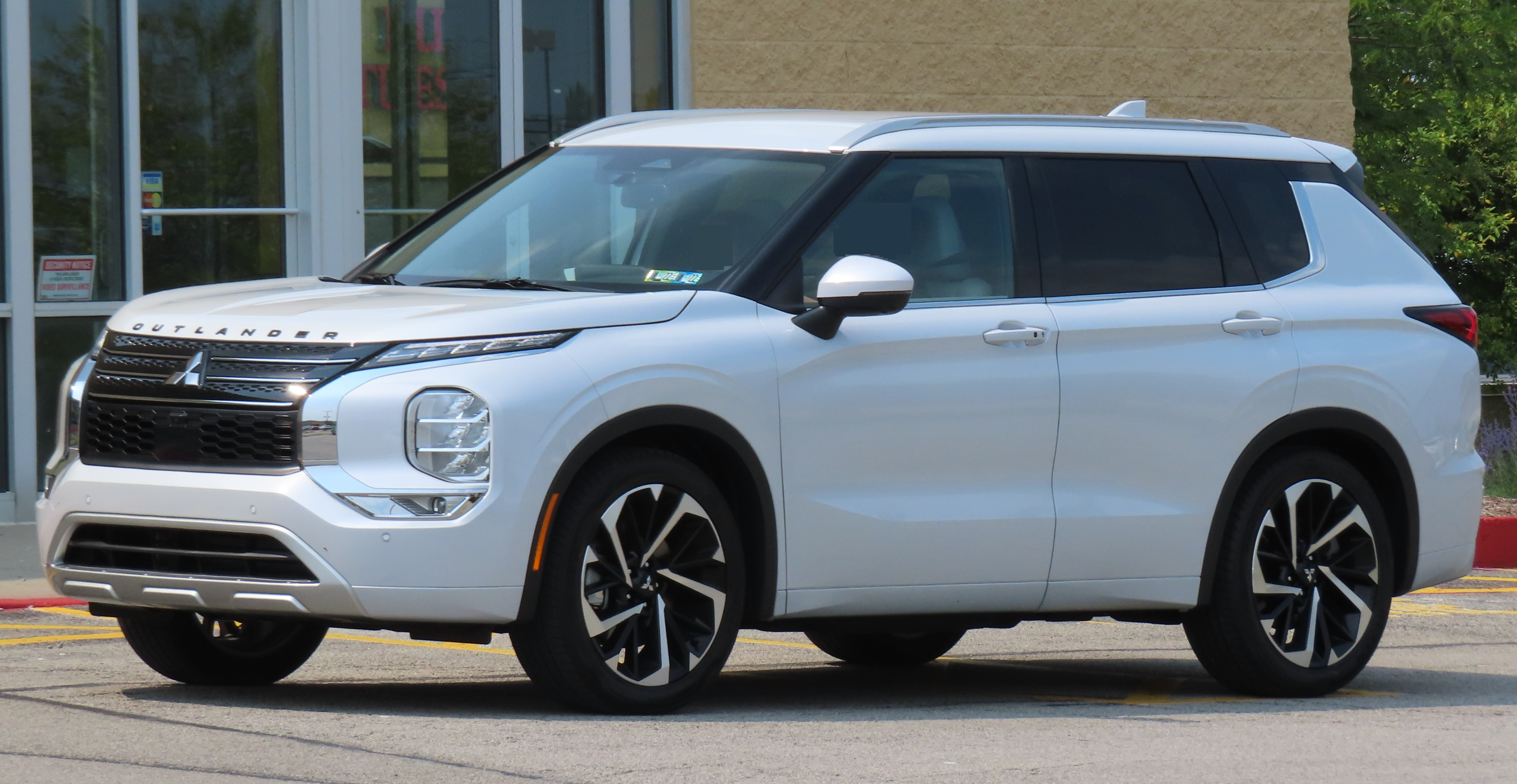
Outlander

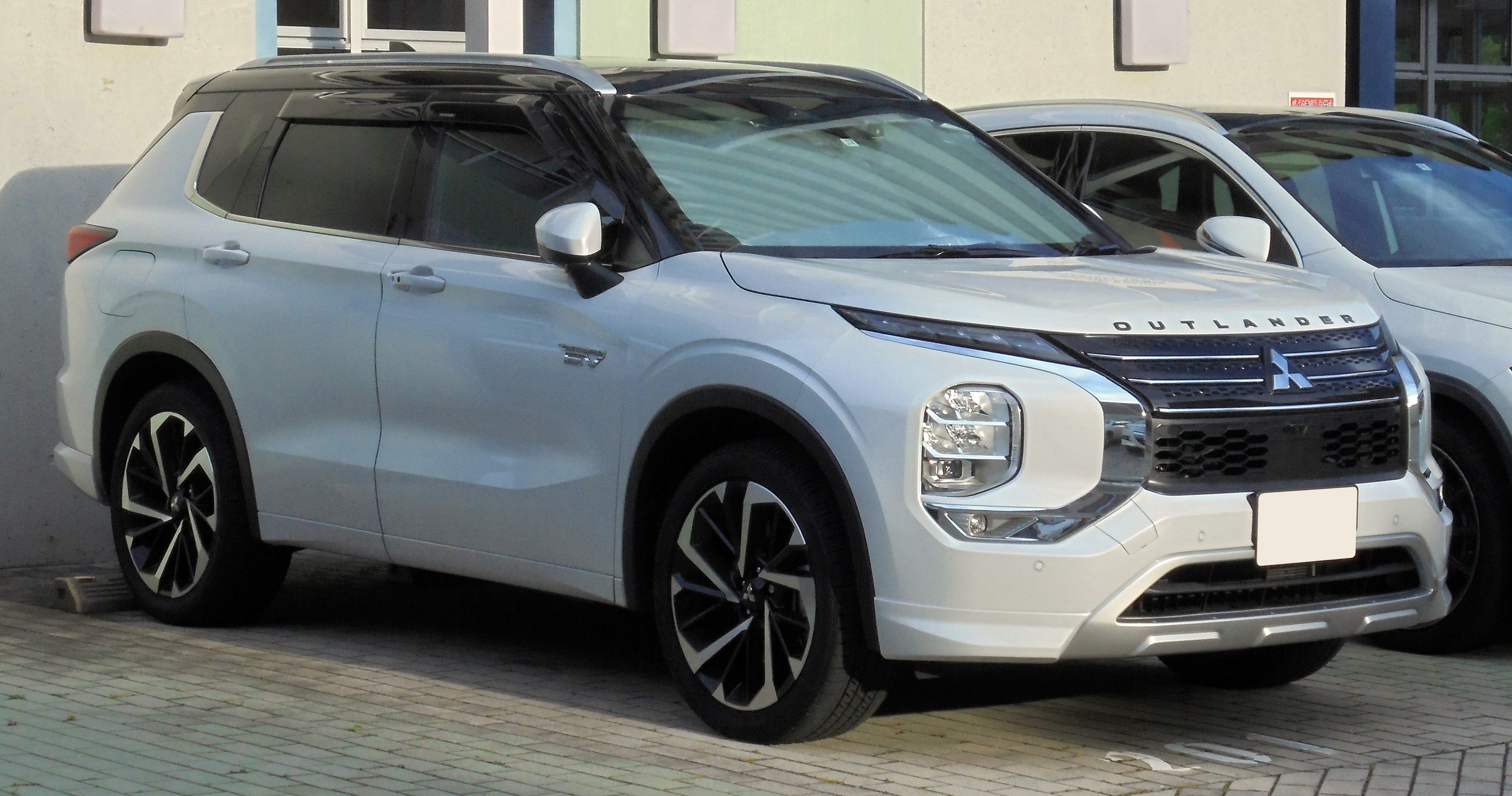
Outlander PHEV

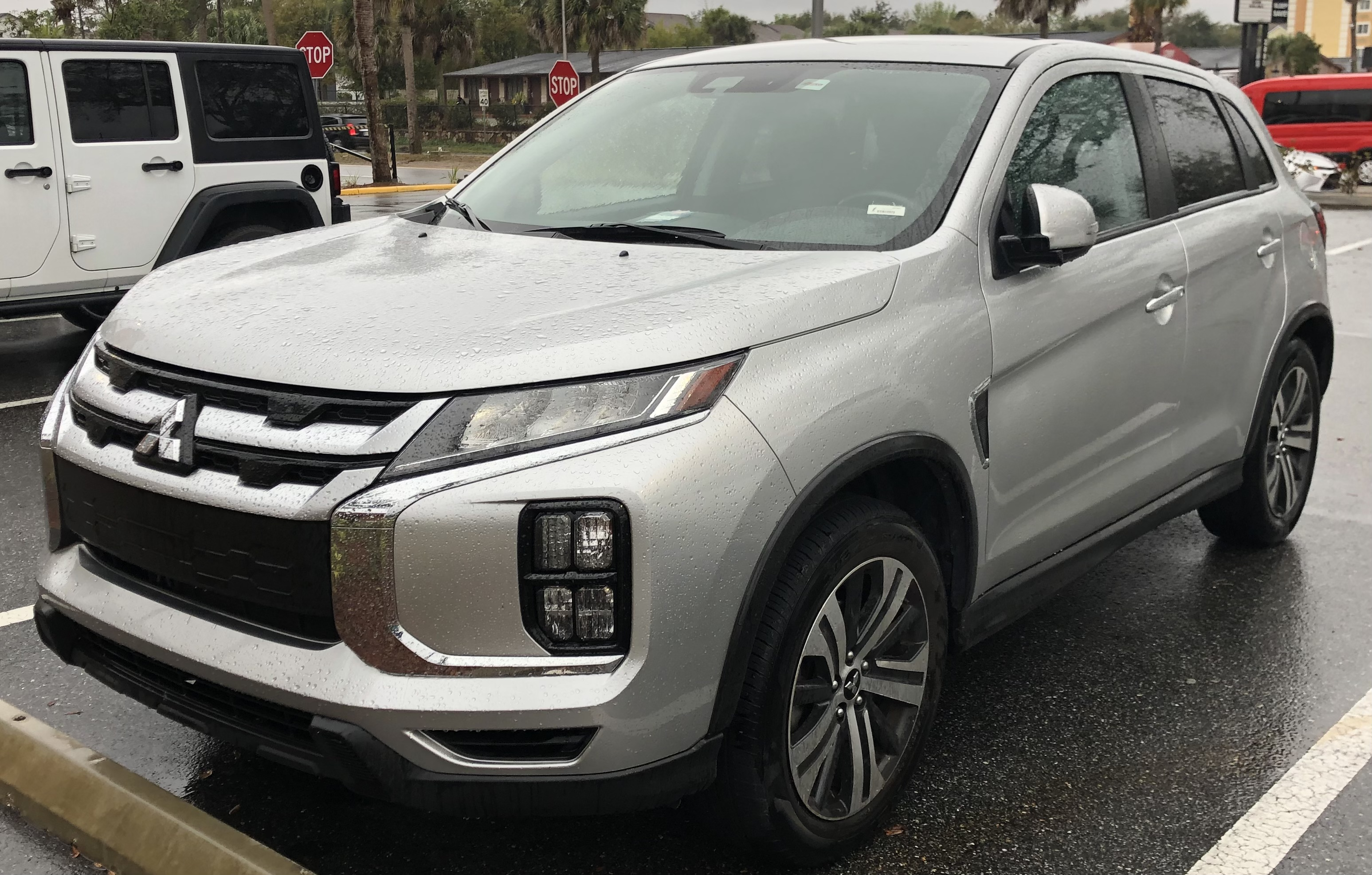
Outlander Sport

== Past notable vehicles ==
3000GT 1990-1999	Eclipse 1990-2012	Galant 1989-2012	Lancer 2002-2017	Lancer Evolution 2003-2015	Montero 1990-2006	Raider 2006-2009

== Controversies ==
In 1994 MMNA was the subject of two lawsuits brought against it. The first, filed by 29 women in December 1994, accused the company of fostering a climate of sexual harassment at its Normal, Illinois plant. Then, in April 1996 the Equal Employment Opportunity Commission (EEOC) filed a class action suit on behalf of approximately 300 other women who worked at the plant. Mitsubishi initially denied any problems at its plant but later hired former U.S. Labor Secretary Lynn Morley Martin to recommend changes to its policies and practices. The 1994 suit was settled for $9.5 million in August 1997, and an agreement with the EEOC was reached later that year as well.
