= Plymouth X2S =

Overview
- Manufacturer: Diamond Star Motors; Mitsubishi Motors; DaimlerChrysler
- Production: 1988

Body and chassis
- Class: Sports car

The Plymouth X2S, also known as the Mitsubishi X2S is the concept vehicle for the original Diamond Star Motors triplet vehicles, the Eagle Talon, the Plymouth Laser, and the Mitsubishi Eclipse, which were the first models produced by the joint-venture from 1989. It is nearly identical to the 1st generation DSMs, except for a dual exhaust which exits out the rear bumper, and more aggressive-looking body panels. A concept convertible X2S was produced along with the coupe, but only the coupe made it into production. The Mitsubishi Eclipse Spyder was later added to the line-up in 1996.

== Drivetrain ==
The X2S is powered by a 16-valve, DOHC 2.0L turbocharged, intercooled four-cylinder engine built by Mitsubishi. The engine made 199hp at 5500 rpm and 189 lb-ft of torque at 5000 rpm. This was the same engine in the first Diamond Star Motors production vehicles. It has a front-wheel-drive and manual transmission.

== Current Location ==
The Plymouth X2S is currently being stored at the DaimlerChrysler Detroit Office Warehouse. It has been seen stored outside, in an L-shaped area on the south side of the building.

== Photos ==
Photos of the vehicle were unveiled to the public in April 1988 issue of Road & Track Magazine.
