= Dodge Daytona =

Motor vehicle by Chrysler, 1984–1993

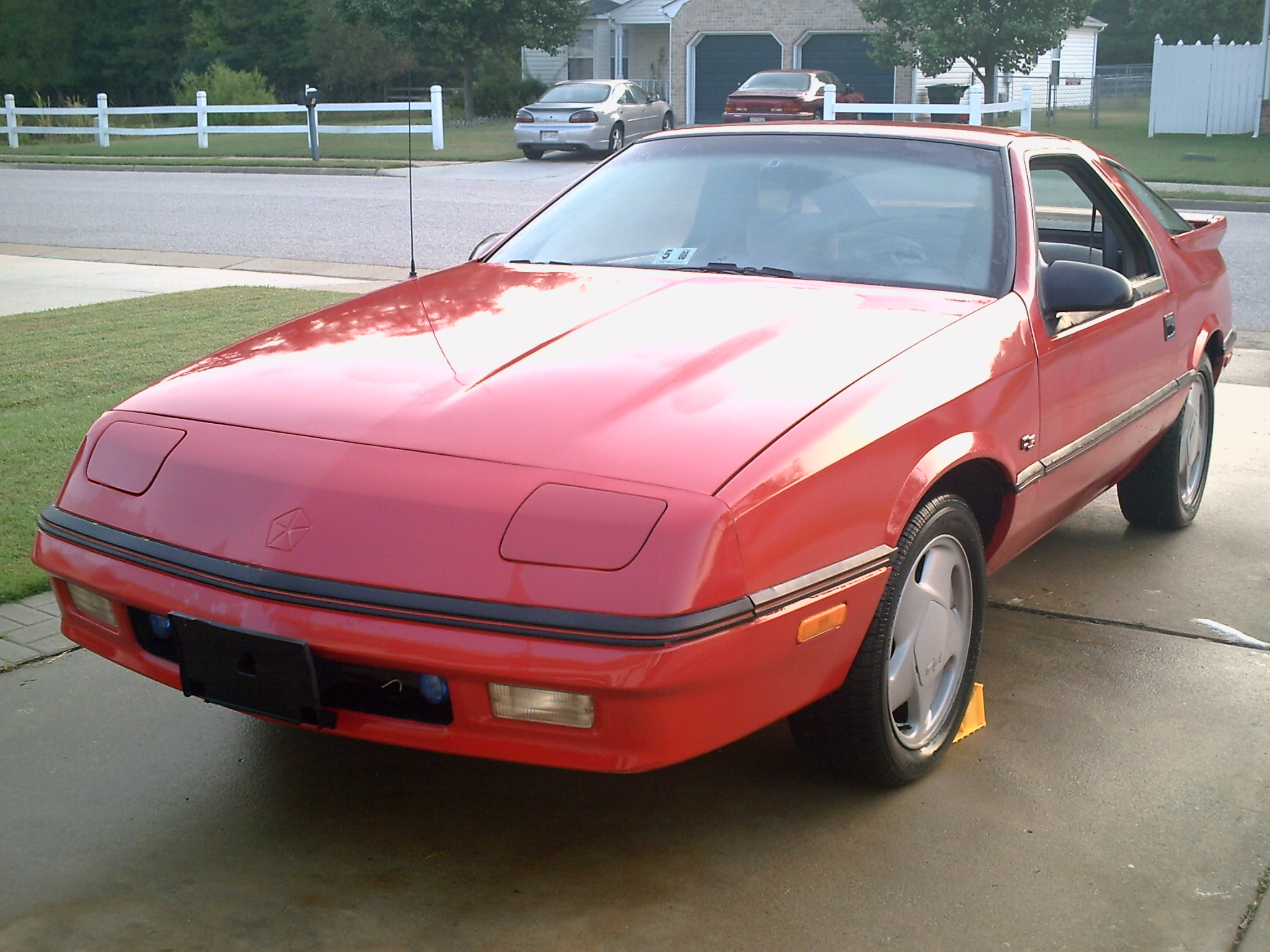
- 1991 Dodge Daytona C/S

Overview
- Manufacturer: Dodge (Chrysler)
- Also called: Chrysler Laser; Chrysler Daytona; Chrysler GS
- Production: October 1983–February 1993
- Model years: 1984–1993
- Assembly: United States: St. Louis, Missouri; United States: Sterling Heights, Michigan
- Designer: Bob Ackerman

Body and chassis
- Class: Sports car
- Body style: 3-door hatchback
- Layout: FF layout
- Platform: G-body

Powertrain
- Engine: 2.2 L K I4; 2.2 L Turbo I I4; 2.2 L Turbo II I4; 2.2 L Turbo III I4; 2.5 L K I4; 2.5 L Turbo I I4; 3.0 L Mitsubishi 6G72 V6
- Transmission: 5-speed manual 3-speed automatic 4-speed automatic

Dimensions
- Wheelbase: 1987–89: 97.0 in (2,464 mm); 1990–93: 97.2 in (2,469 mm)
- Length: 1987–1991: 179.2 in (4,552 mm); 1990–93 ES & IROC: 179.8 in (4,567 mm); 1992–93 Base: 179.0 in (4,547 mm)
- Width: 69.3 in (1,760 mm)
- Height: 1987–89: 50.1 in (1,273 mm); 1990–93: 50.3 in (1,278 mm); 1990–91 IROC & 1992–93 IROC R/T: 50.6 in (1,285 mm); 1992–93 IROC: 50.4 in (1,280 mm)

Chronology
- Predecessor: Dodge Challenger
- Successor: Dodge Avenger; Plymouth Laser; Chrysler LeBaron coupe (for Chrysler Laser)

The Dodge Daytona is an automobile which was produced by the Chrysler Corporation under their Dodge division from 1984 until 1993. It was a front-wheel drive hatchback based on the Chrysler G platform, which was derived from the Chrysler K platform. The Chrysler Laser was an upscale rebadged version of the Daytona. The Daytona was restyled for 1987, and again for 1992. It replaced the Mitsubishi Galant-based Challenger, and slotted between the Charger and the Conquest. The Daytona was replaced by the 1995 Dodge Avenger, which was built by Mitsubishi Motors. The Daytona derives its name mainly from the Dodge Charger Daytona, which itself was named after the Daytona 500 race in Daytona Beach, Florida.

== History ==
The Daytona originally used the 2.2 L Chrysler K engine in naturally aspirated or turbocharged form. Power outputs are 93 and 142 hp (69 and 106 kW) respectively. The 100-horsepower (75 kW), 2.5-litre K engine was added for 1986. In 1985, the 2.2-L Turbo I engine's horsepower was increased to 146 hp (109 kW). The 1984 Daytona was available in three trim lines: standard, Turbo and Turbo Z. Total production was 49,347. The Daytona Turbo was on Car and Driver magazine's 10Best list for 1984. Both the Daytona and Chrysler Laser were available with the Chrysler electronic voice alert system through 1987. A performance oriented "Shelby" version of the Daytona was introduced in 1987.

=== 1984 ===
The Daytona debuted with a 142 hp Turbo I motor. Many Turbo Z models were produced and were more luxurious than other years due to their use of Mark Cross leather, light up speakers, and rear amplifier switches. These options were dropped after 1984.

=== 1985 ===
Changes were minimal for the Daytona's second year of production. The Turbo Z model was no longer listed as a package but was now a model in its own right. The wraparound spoiler, formerly exclusive to the Turbo Z model, was now offered on all three models. But the biggest change was under the hood: the 2.2 Turbo was given four more hp to 146 hp (109 kW), and a new shift linkage was added. Optional "Swiss cheese" wheels were replaced with new optional "pizza" wheels. All wheels now had five lug nuts (instead of four). Total production was 47,519.

=== 1986 ===
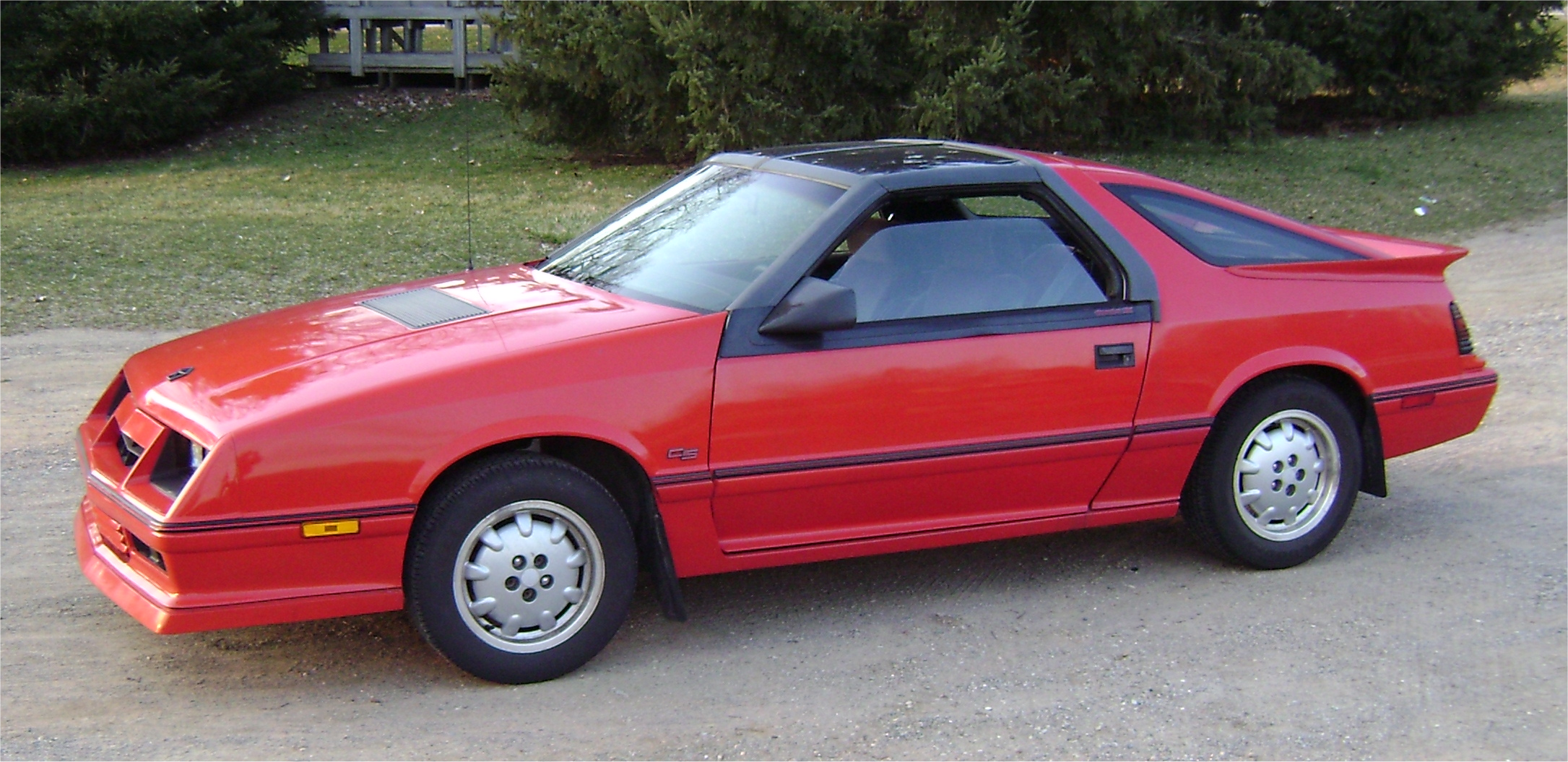
1986 Daytona Turbo Z CS (Carroll Shelby) with T roof

There were several changes for the 1986 Daytona. The middle "Turbo" model was dropped, leaving only two models, the base and Turbo Z. Engine changes were also made, including a new 2.5 L 100 hp (75 kW) four-cylinder engine for the base model. A new T-roof package was added to the option list, and 5,984 Daytona owners chose this option. The biggest addition was the C/S (Carroll Shelby) suspension package, available only as an option on the Turbo Z. This consisted of 32 mm (1.3 in) front and 28 mm (1.1 in) rear anti-sway bars, performance tuned struts, and 225/50VR15 Goodyear Eagle Gatorback tires. This package would foreshadow the Daytona Shelby of 1987 and beyond. Some 7,704 owners added this handling package to their Daytonas. Total production this year was 44,366.

=== 1987–1988 ===
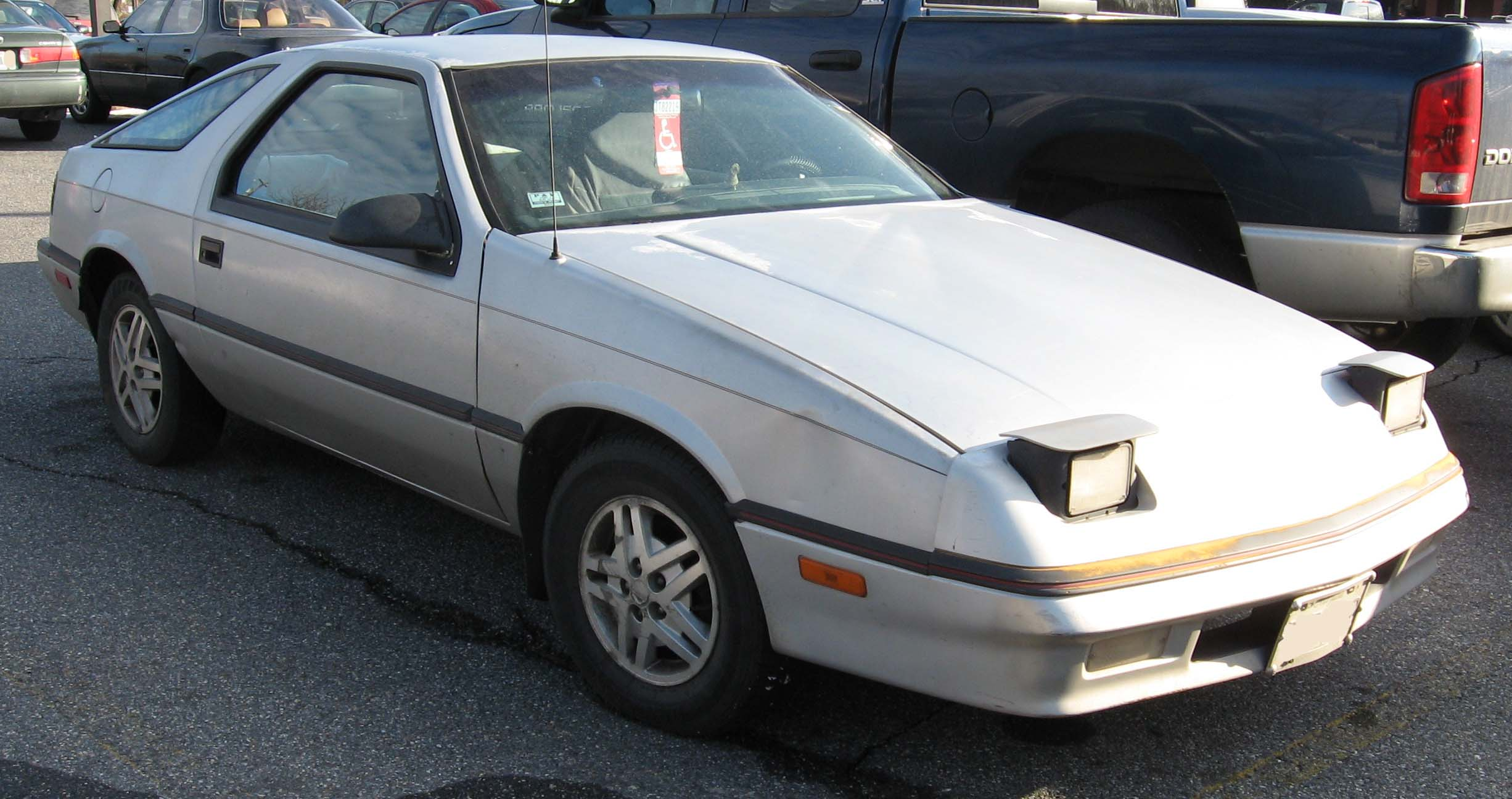
1987–1991 Dodge Daytona

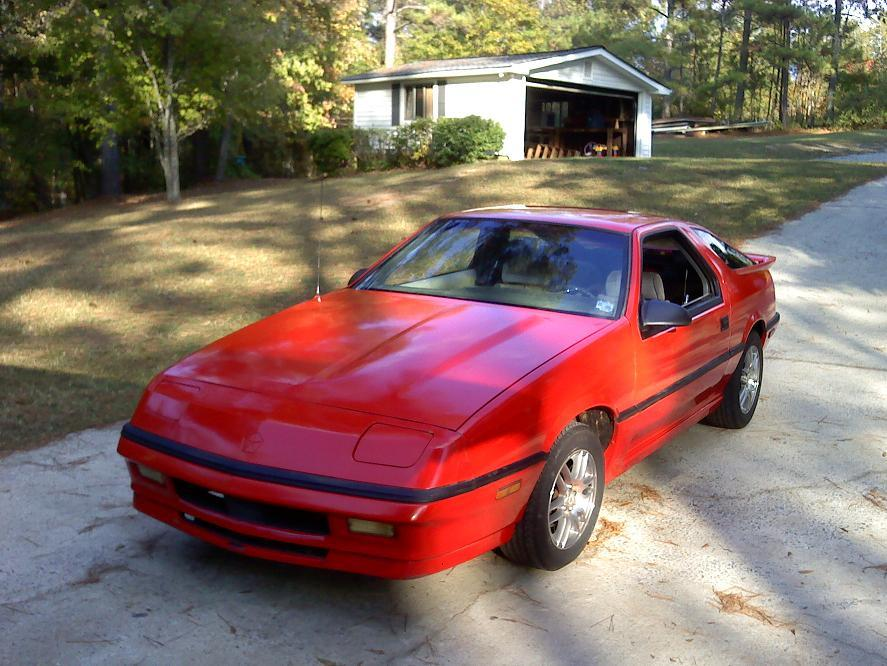
1987 Dodge Daytona Shelby Z

For 1987, the Daytona was restyled externally, and featured pop-up headlights. New in 1987 was a Shelby Z trim level with an available Chrysler developed Turbo II intercooled version of the 2.2 L Chrysler K engine, as well as a heavy-duty A555 transaxle with Getrag gears. The engine produces 174 hp (130 kW) and 200 lb⋅ft (271 N⋅m) of torque. The Shelby Z also featured numerous suspension upgrades, including a larger diameter front sway bar and disc brakes on all four wheels. This version was sold in Europe under the name Chrysler GS Turbo II. A more luxury-oriented Pacifica trim line was also added to replace the Chrysler Laser, which was dropped in mid-year 1986. Among the optional equipment was a leather interior, eight-way power enthusiast driver's seat (with mechanical thigh and lumbar controls), digital-instrument cluster, and a twelve-button trip computer (with instant fuel ratings as well as trip averages and estimated-travel times). In 1988, the C/S package was revived. However, this time the C/S was only available on the base-model Daytona. In order to reduce weight and produce a lighter Daytona, the C/S came without the ground effects and other features that were on the Shelby. The AGB model C/S had a Turbo I 2.2 L engine, which was available with either an automatic or manual transmission.

==== Decepzione ====
Following the Chrysler takeover of Lamborghini, product programs general manager Jack Stavana introduced a program to fit a Lamborghini Jalpa V8 into a Daytona. The motor was linked to an all-wheel drive (AWD) system designed by Lotus UK and the car was called the Decepzione. Despite its performance and media buzz generated by articles in Automobile magazine, the project was discontinued because of the engine's oil pan having just 1.5 inches (38.1 mm) of ground clearance, necessitated by the comparatively tall engine block.

=== 1989–1991 ===
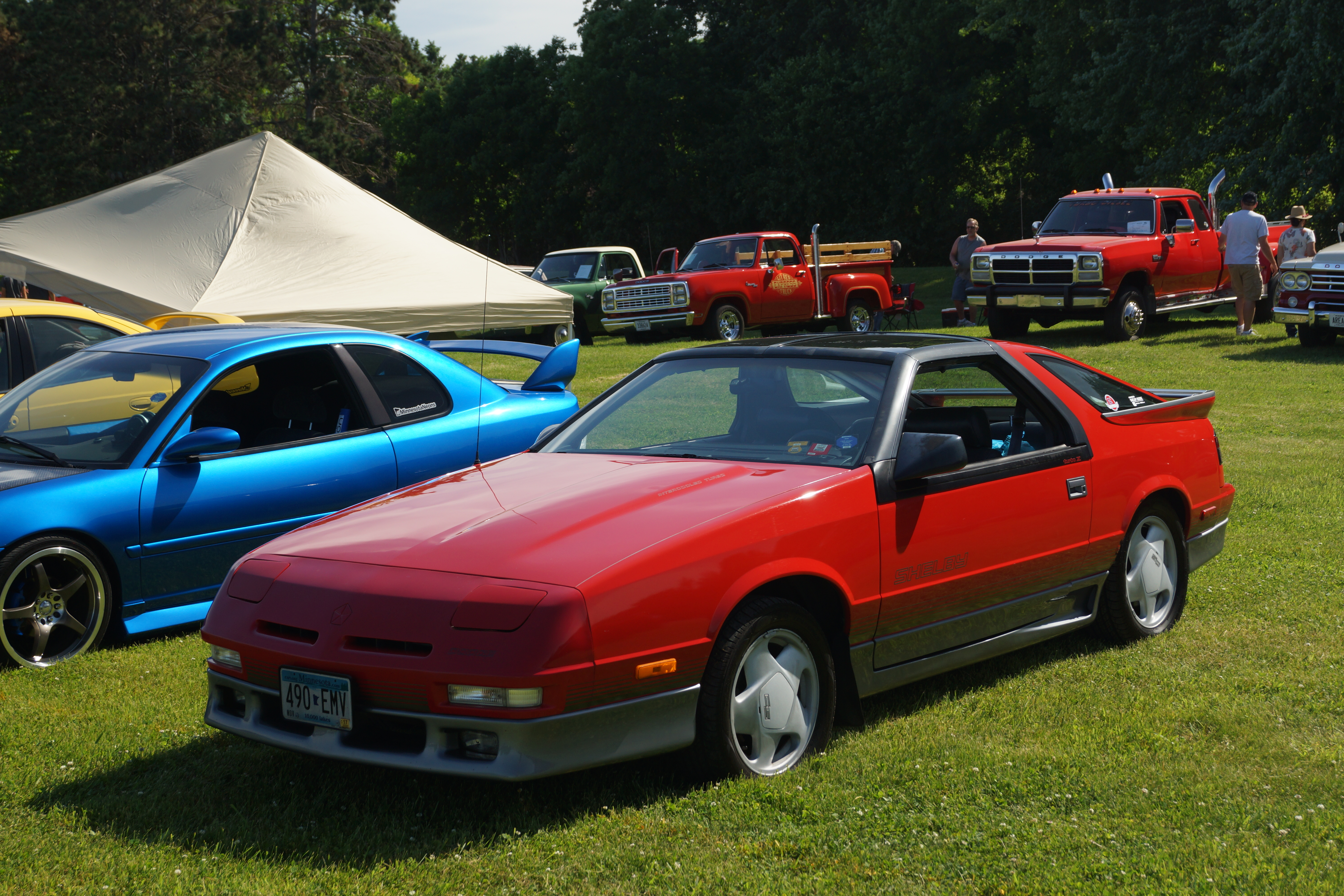
1989 Dodge Daytona Shelby

For the 1989 model year, the ES model was introduced. The ES model was an appearance package/equipment group offered on base models in order to attract the "average" Daytona buyer’s eye without a major price hike. It featured silver contrasting ground effects, along with "snowflake" patterned alloy wheels. The 2.2 L Turbo I was replaced with the 2.5 L Turbo I, rated at 150 hp and 180 ft. lbs. of torque. Also introduced in 1989 was the AGS C/S Competition model, which was featured along with the regular AGB model. This new C/S model featured an intercooled 2.2 L Turbo II engine, along with many other features that were also on the Shelby. However, this model was only available with a manual transmission. The AGS C/S package would remain in availability until 1991. The AGB C/S Performance model had the 2.5 L non-intercooled Turbo I engine available with five-speed manual or three-speed automatic. A driver's side airbag was standard on the US-market models, optional on Canadian-market models.

For 1990, all Daytonas received an interior restyling, featuring a modernized cockpit-style wraparound dashboard. A variable nozzle turbocharger (VNT Turbo IV), borrowed from the 1989 Shelby CSX VNT, was offered in the Shelby model producing the same 174 hp (130 kW) as the Turbo II but eliminated turbo lag and improved drivability. Also for 1990, a 3.0 L SOHC Mitsubishi V6 was made available.

For 1991, the 2.2 L turbocharged engine was dropped in favor of the new 2.5 L "high torque" turbocharged engine. Although sporting a lesser power output of 152 hp, this engine offered 210 ft. lbs. of torque, exceeding that of the Turbo II. Also new was the addition of an IROC model with either the 3.0 L V6 or turbocharged 2.5 L engine. Visually, IROC models differed from lesser models, having a ground effects kit and alloy wheels, among other differences. The IROC decals where added in halfway through 1991 even though all Shelby Daytonas from 1991 were considered to be IROCs. There is no difference between a 1991 Shelby and an IROC besides the decals and the letter "J" in the VIN sequence; on 1991 Daytona Shelbys, the VIN has the sequence G74J and IROC models have the sequence G743.

=== 1992–1993 ===
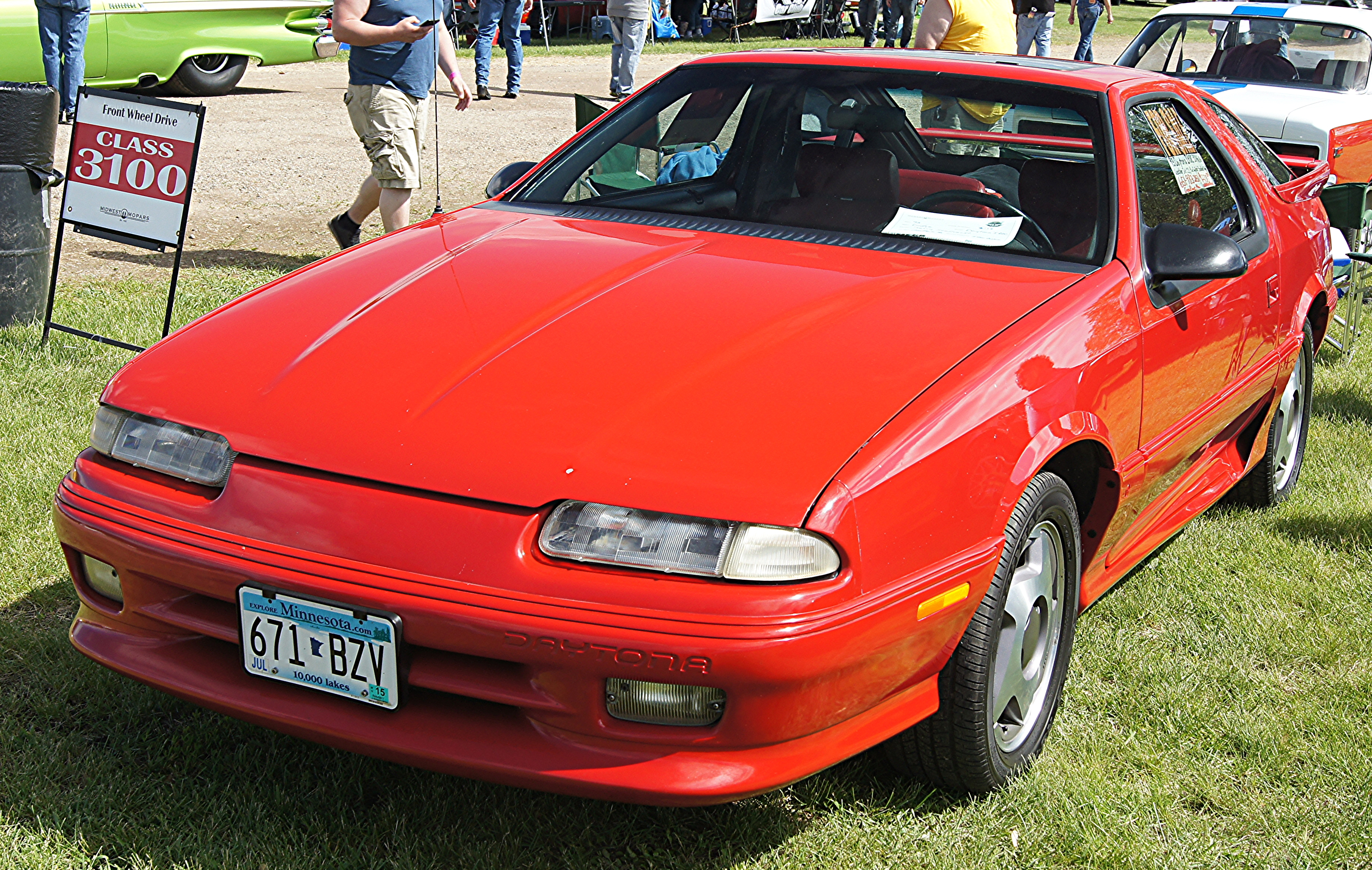
Dodge Daytona (1992 facelift)

For the 1992 model year, production was moved from the St. Louis, Missouri plant to the Sterling Heights, Michigan plant. The Daytona also received a thorough facelift, which was previewed by the Dodge Daytona R/T concept introduced two years earlier in 1990. The facelift replaced the pop-up headlights with flush-mounted rounded ones and added a new grille and rear fascia. Window surround moldings on the doors were also new, and rounder than the sharp angles of the moldings on 1984 to 1991 models. The 1992 model also displayed the new Dodge "ram head" emblem on the hood and below the taillights. While the 3.0 L V6 became an option on lower end models, it was the standard engine on IROC models. Optional on the 1992 IROC was the 2.5 L "High Torque" Turbo, available as a very rare option (less than 230 produced). Also available on the IROC was the new R/T performance package, which featured a 224 hp (167 kW) Turbo III version of the 2.2 L four-cylinder, but with a Lotus designed DOHC cylinder head and direct ignition system instead of a distributor-type ignition system; this engine was shared with the Dodge Spirit R/T. Although the Shelby trim was discontinued after 1991 (due to the end of Carroll Shelby's involvement with Chrysler), a small number of 1992 Daytona IROCs were produced bearing the Shelby name. These IROCs featured "Shelby" decals which were added at the dealership or later to help boost sales. All were 2.5 Turbo cars as they featured the Shelby Performance Package sales code. These were superseded by the IROC package. Shelby versions were mainly "Chrysler" branded Daytonas which were sold overseas and were part of an early run of IROCs. These were the last production vehicles produced by Chrysler to bear the Shelby name. Production of the Daytona ended on February 26, 1993 without an immediate replacement. The 1995 Dodge Avenger eventually took the Daytona's place.

Production Figures:

Dodge Daytona Production Figures
	Yearly Production
1984	49,347
1985	47,519
1986	44,366
1987	33,104
1988	66,677
1989	69,998
1990	38,488
1991	17,523
1992	10,937
1993	9,062
Total	387,021

== Chrysler Laser ==
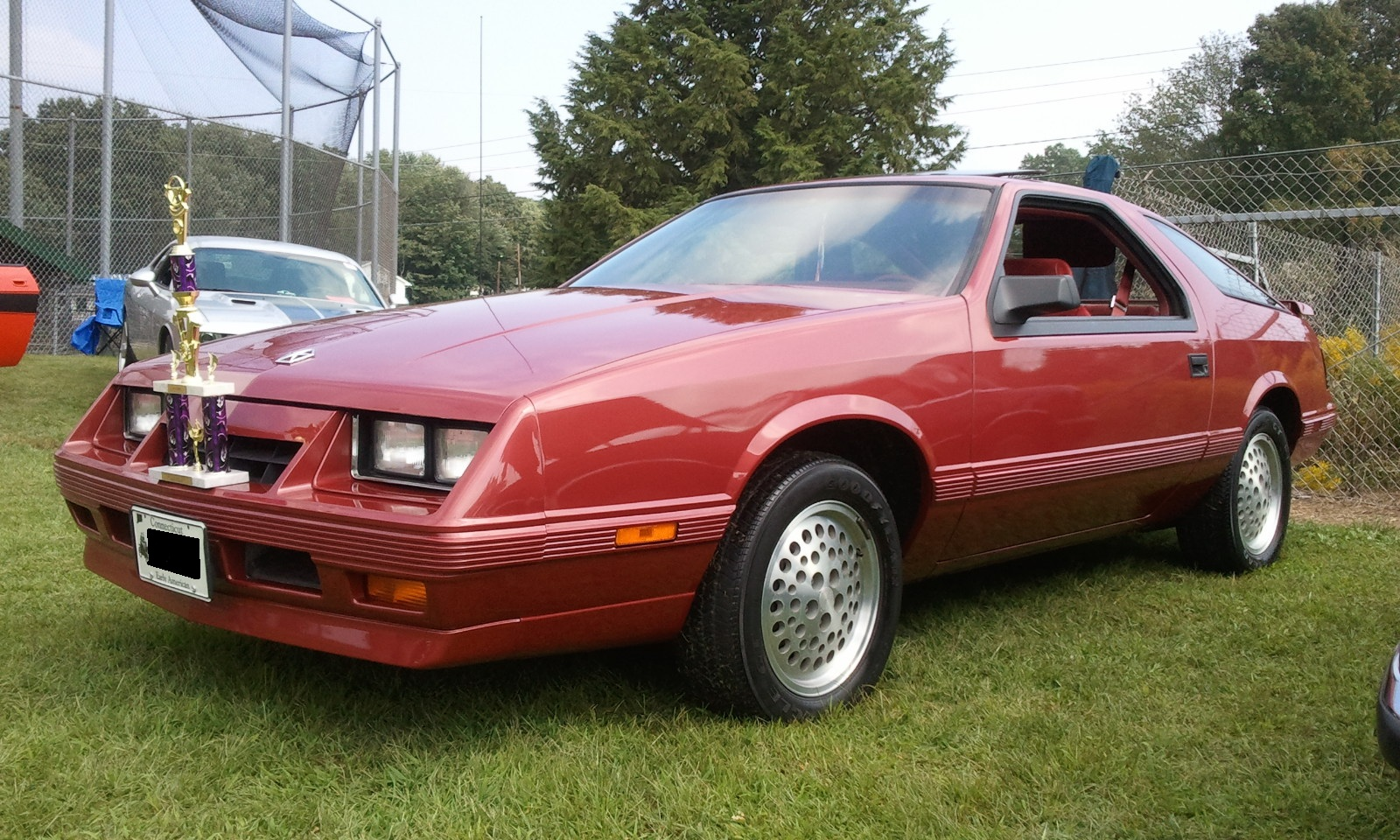
1985 Chrysler Laser XE

The Chrysler Laser was billed as the Chrysler brand's first sports car, while the 1950s and 1960s Chrysler 300 letter series coupes and convertibles were very powerful and fast at the time. The Laser was a virtual clone of the Dodge Daytona, but came only in the upscale trim version. It was produced from 1984 to 1986. The Laser emphasized European luxury, and was intended to be an "executive personal luxury coupe". The Laser was sleek, low-slung, and aerodynamic, with a drag coefficient of 0.35. The car had a large rear hatchback, with a rear deck-lid spoiler. The 1984 Laser was available in two trim lines: standard and XE. In mid-1985, the XT trim was added as the top-of-the-line version. The standard, XE and XT trim lines would continue until the Laser’s demise in mid-1986. After 1986, the Daytona was exported to Canada as the Chrysler Daytona, officially ending Canadian Daytona sales under the Dodge marque. The turbo version of the Laser could be recognized by its use of black hood louvers. The 2.2 L Turbo I engine was available as standard equipment in the XE and XT trim lines and optional on the standard model. The Laser was replaced by the Mitsubishi built Chrysler Conquest, a rear-wheel drive vehicle which competed directly against the Toyota Celica Supra. The Laser name was silently terminated after the first half of 1986 model year, then resurrected for the 1990 model year as the Plymouth Laser, built by Diamond Star Motors, a joint venture between Chrysler and Mitsubishi. The rebranded Laser shared its body and chassis with the Eagle Talon and Mitsubishi Eclipse.

In 1987, the Chrysler LeBaron coupe was restyled as a more proper sports car, removing Chrysler's need for the Laser. However, the Laser’s luxury performance image would be carried over into the 1987 Dodge Daytona Pacifica as well as the Lancer Pacifica and other Dodge vehicles styled by Chrysler's Pacifica Studios.

The Laser was specified to have an estimated 22 mpg_{‑US} (11 L/100 km; 26 mpg_{‑imp}) city/35 mpg_{‑US} (6.7 L/100 km; 42 mpg_{‑imp}) highway fuel mileage. Chrysler offered a five-year or 50,000-mile (80,000 km) warranty, or a protection plan with outer body rust-through protection, based on United States Automobile Club tests. Mark Cross leather seats and a six-way power option were available as options.

Notable features of the Chrysler Laser XE included:

- A dashboard with digital readouts for the speedometer, tachometer, odometer, temperature, oil pressure, voltage, and fuel
- An electronic monitoring system situated near the top of the center console. This monitoring system checked 22 separate functions on the car, such as an open door, low fuel, or a blown taillight, and would give a digital readout of the situation, along with an audio message produced by a synthesized voice.
- An electronic navigator, which would give information on fuel mileage, miles traveled, distance to destination, and elapsed driving time

=== Production numbers ===
- 1984: 59,858 (Laser: 33,976/Laser XE: 25,882)
- 1985: 50,866 (Laser: 29,221/Laser XE: 18,193/Laser XT: 3,452)
- 1986: 36,672 (Laser: 14,134/Laser XE: 15,549/Laser XT: 6,989)
