= Eagle Medallion =

Car model produced by Renault and marketed by American Motors Corporation

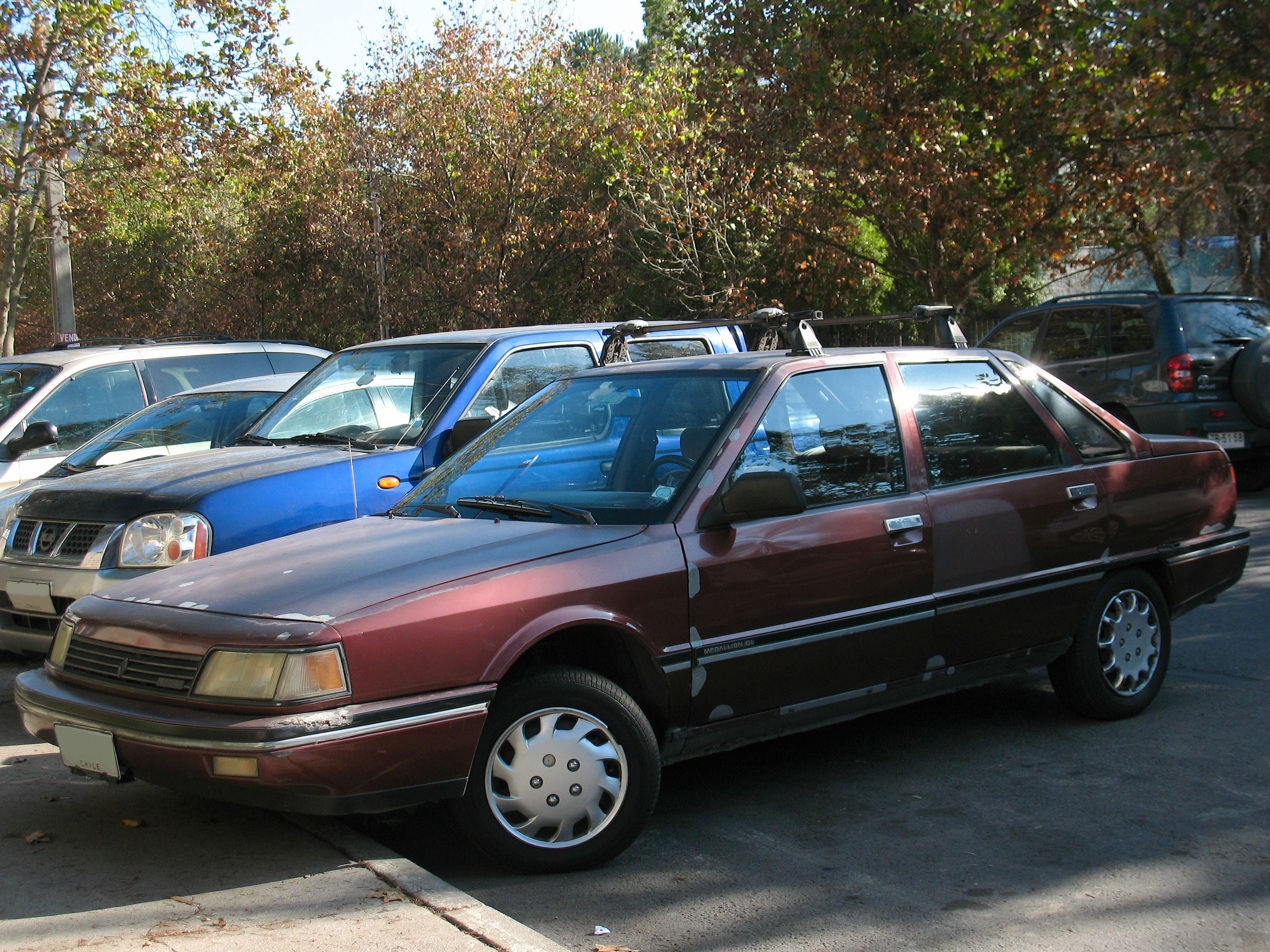
- 1988 Renault Medallion 2.0 DL

Overview
- Manufacturer: Eagle
- Also called: Renault Medallion (1988)
- Production: 1987–1989
- Model years: 1988–1989
- Assembly: France: Maubeuge (MCA)
- Designer: Giorgetto Giugiaro, Italdesign

Body and chassis
- Class: Mid-size
- Body style: 4-door sedan; 4-door station wagon
- Layout: Longitudinally mounted front-engine, front-wheel drive
- Related: Renault 21

Powertrain
- Engine: 2.2 L Douvrin I4
- Transmission: 5-speed manual; 3-speed automatic

Dimensions
- Wheelbase: Sedan: 102.4 in (2,600 mm); Wagon: 108.3 in (2,750 mm)
- Length: Sedan: 182.2 in (4,628 mm); Wagon: 190 in (4,826 mm)
- Width: 67.5 in (1,714 mm)
- Height: Sedan: 55.7 in (1,415 mm)
- Curb weight: Sedan: 2,588 lb (1,174 kg); Wagon: 2,736 lb (1,241 kg)

Chronology
- Predecessor: Renault 18i/Sportwagon; AMC Concord
- Successor: Eagle/Dodge 2000GTX (Canada); Dodge Spirit (U.S.)

The Eagle Medallion, also marketed as the Renault Medallion, is a rebadged and mildly re-engineered North American version of the French Renault 21 marketed by American Motors Corporation under the Renault brand for the 1988 model year, and by Chrysler's Jeep/Eagle division for the 1989 model year.

The front-engine, front-wheel drive, four-door D-segment, or mid-size Medallion was launched in North America on 1 March 1987. The Medallion was imported from France, sharing its platform with the Renault 21. Just eight days after the North American introduction of the Medallion, Renault initiated the sale of its stock in American Motors to Chrysler on 9 March 1987.

== History ==
The Renault 21 was introduced in Europe in 1986 to compete in the large family-size market, such as the VW Passat. Its design was the work of Giorgetto Giugiaro. Modified to meet United States requirements for safety and emissions, as well as being rebadged as the Medallion, it became a captive import for Renault's corporate partner, American Motors Corporation (AMC). It went on sale on 1 March 1987 as a 1988 model and filled the market segment gap for AMC/Renault dealers following the slow-selling Renault 18i/Sportwagon and the venerable AMC Concord. Both the 18i sedan and Concord had been discontinued after the 1983 model year, while the Sportwagon version of the 18i was marketed through 1986. Therefore, from 1984 until 1987, AMC/Renault dealers offered no sedan larger than the small C-segment Alliance. The larger D-segment Medallion sedan was thus important to dealers by offering a broader product line to buyers.

The Medallion was an Americanized version of the Renault 21, "a highly successful car in the European market." The Medallion was the second entry in a three-model marketing effort to expand market coverage for AMC/Jeep/Renault dealers beyond the four-wheel-drive Jeep utility vehicles. The first product in that plan was the C-segment Renault Alliance that launched for the 1983 model year, while the third was the E-segment Eagle Premier, which launched ten months after the D-segment Medallion. AMC/Renault was planning to sell between 40,000 and 45,000 Medallions annually.

Badged as the Renault Medallion at its press launch in the winter of 1986, retail sales began on 1 March 1987 - just eight days before Chrysler agreed to buy Renault's shares in American Motors - as an early 1988 model. The Medallion retained its Renault branding after the Chrysler buyout, through the end of the 1988 model year, despite Chrysler's formation of the Jeep/Eagle Division in the fall of 1987. The Medallion was launched as a 1988 Renault model before Chrysler's buyout of AMC and before the separate Eagle marque existed. The new corporate owner waited until the beginning of the 1989 model year to rebrand the Medallion as an Eagle - Chrysler's first new brand since 1955, to avoid selling the Medallion under both the Renault and Eagle nameplates during 1988. As an Eagle, the cars did not include Chrysler's "Pentastar" logo, but prominently featured the Eagle head logo.

The cars were marketed as "Eagle Medallion" for the 1989 model year and sold through the newly formed Jeep-Eagle division. As a distinct Chrysler subsidiary, the nearly 1,200 AMC-Jeep-Renault dealer organization would initially remain independent. As part of the buyout, Chrysler would continue AMC's program for U.S. distribution of the new Renault Medallion for five years, but not to sell the originally contracted number of the French imports.

== Design ==
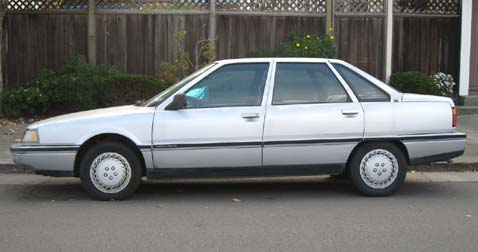
Side

Eagle Medallion Front

Eagle Medallion Rear

The Medallion was built in Maubeuge using the platform of the European market Renault 21, and imported from France. It was re-engineered for the U.S. and Canadian markets and differed from the Renault 21 in numerous features, trims, frontal styling, more substantial bumpers and safety-related features, as well as powertrain availability. The final assembly of options and trim was performed at a facility at the U.S. port of entry.

The front-wheel drive Medallion used the 2.2 L I4 engine that also powered the European Renault 25. It was mounted in a traditional longitudinal (front-back) configuration, driving the front wheels through either a 5-speed manual transmission or a 3-speed computer-controlled automatic. The longitudinal engine placement was somewhat unusual for a front-wheel drive car of this era, as the transverse engine layout is typically more space-efficient. However, Audi, SAAB, and Subaru used longitudinal engines with front-wheel-drive in this era, as well.

It was unusual that Renault designed the R21 to use transverse-mounted sub-2 liter engines, and longitudinal engines over 2 liters, which included all Medallion versions. Renault did this for two reasons: 1) The larger, more powerful engines required stronger gearboxes that could not be made to fit into the transaxle assembly typical to transverse powertrains, and 2) The longitudinal engine/transmission layout allowed Renault to use equal-length half-shafts from a centrally mounted gearbox, which reduced torque steering that would have otherwise been brought on by the increased power generated by the larger engines. The longitudinal engine R21s and Medallions thus had slightly shorter wheelbases than the transverse engine R21s. Product plans also called for a four-wheel drive Medallion to be imported in late-1988.

All Medallions had an aluminum 132 cu in (2.2 L) overhead cam I4 engine with Bendix multi-point fuel injection. The engine was rated at 103 hp (77 kW; 104 PS) at 5000 rpm and 124 pound force-feet (168 N⋅m) at 2500 rpm, achieving United States Environmental Protection Agency (EPA) fuel economy ratings of:

42 mpg_{‑US} (5.6 L/100 km; 50 mpg_{‑imp}) highway, 27 mpg_{‑US} (8.7 L/100 km; 32 mpg_{‑imp}) city, 33 mpg_{‑US} (7.1 L/100 km; 40 mpg_{‑imp}) combined, with the manual transmission, and
33 mpg_{‑US} (7.1 L/100 km; 40 mpg_{‑imp}) highway, 22 mpg_{‑US} (11 L/100 km; 26 mpg_{‑imp}) city, 26 mpg_{‑US} (9.0 L/100 km; 31 mpg_{‑imp}) combined, with the automatic.

The Medallion featured four-wheel independent suspension with MacPherson struts in the front with negative offset for stability and inclined lower wishbones for anti-dive effect, while the rear suspension is controlled by a V-section cross-member with four transverse torsion bars and inclined shock absorbers.

When the original European Renault 21 models were shown in 1986, they featured a different design compared to the contemporary cars of the era with more rectilinear traditional designs. The new Renault 21 design most closely resembled the aerodynamic look of the Audi 100 models introduced in 1983. The Medallion was described as having a "crisp look in contemporary wedge/aerodynamic styling." One automobile journalist judged the station wagon version as "arguably the most stylish compact wagon on the market."

The interior of the Medallion was spacious compared to similar cars in the compact segment, which AMC compared it to. The total volume index of the sedan was rated at 115 cubic feet (3,256 L). This put the Medallion in the mid-size car class according to EPA market segments (those between 110 and 120 cu ft (3,115 and 3,398 L) of passenger and luggage space). The sedan was also notable for its rather commodious trunk.

The station wagon was typically French in design, built on a longer wheelbase than the sedan. The wagon was rated at 100 cu ft (2,832 L) passenger area and 42 cu ft (1,189 L) of cargo volume behind the second row of seats. The Medallion station wagon seats "five adults in true comfort - and will accept an additional two kids" with the optional bench seat for the cargo area. This was a front-facing third-row seat, such as in the Oldsmobile Vista Cruiser and Ford Freestyle.

== Model years ==
=== 1988 ===
Medallion sedans were offered in base DL and uplevel LX sedans, as well as a DL wagon, for the long 1988 model year. Standard equipment on all Medallions included a tachometer, digital clock, AM/FM stereo, tinted glass, tilt steering wheel, power steering, power brakes, and a driver's seat-height adjuster for the reclining front seats. The station wagon also included a locking storage bin, as well as an adjustable roof rack and a rear-window wiper. George C. Scott was the spokesperson for Renault products at the time and was featured prominently in commercials for the 1988 Renault Medallion, touting its new, larger size and competitive power, interior room, and warranty coverage.

Exterior styling showed many unusual features, including slightly skirted rear wheel arches, fixed chromed door handles with hidden squeeze-type actuators, and a decklid that wrapped over the tops of the rear fenders. At the front, the Medallion featured flush-mounted composite headlamps - a first for an AMC vehicle - mounted on either side of a flush grille with 3 horizontal black bars and a prominent Renault diamond logo. Medallion DL sedans offered a different taillight lens pattern than uplevel LX sedans did, with smoked clear reflector lenses continuing inward from the Medallion's reversing lights, and surrounding the upper portion of the decklid-mounted rear license plate depression. The LX sedans showed red lenses in this area instead. A power sunroof option on LX models was available later in the 1988 model year. Medallion station wagons had a 5.9-inch (150 mm) longer wheelbase, and rear doors were much longer than those of their sedan counterpart, to improve optional third seat ingress and egress. While unusual for its class in the North American market, the wagon's uniquely longer wheelbase (more than 2 in (51 mm) longer than the much larger Eagle Premier's) was in keeping with French station wagon tradition to maximize interior space for passengers or cargo. This design was also used on the competing Peugeot 504 and 505.

The new Renault Medallion station wagon was reviewed by Kiplinger's Personal Finance magazine as "surprisingly comfortable, with a load of standard features for its relatively modest $10,693 base price." The "powerful engine allows it to whiz through city traffic with ease" and the wagon's interior was "spartan," but "spacious and comfortable."

A week-long review of an automatic transmission equipped 1988 Medallion by The Milwaukee Sentinel described it as an "eye-appealing alternative for those shopping for a compact four-door sedan" offering "peppy" performance with an engine that "purred contently at highway speeds" while offering a smooth ride in both the city and on the highway returning an actual combined 23 mpg_{‑US} (10 L/100 km; 28 mpg_{‑imp}) fuel economy, but the sedan's low weight at 2,420 lb (1,098 kg), was criticized as too light on open roads in the wind and the insulation to reduce road noise seemed inadequate. The EPA estimated fuel efficiency for the station wagon at 21 mpg_{‑US} (11 L/100 km; 25 mpg_{‑imp}) in the city, 30 mpg_{‑US} (7.8 L/100 km; 36 mpg_{‑imp}) for highway, and 24 mpg_{‑US} (9.8 L/100 km; 29 mpg_{‑imp}) combined.

A long-term test by Popular Mechanics found the Medallion "low on flash, high on comfort" especially on long-distance journeys and along the roughest roads in New York City, and the editors came to regard it as a "pretty nice car." Other automotive guides recommended the Medallion for its comfortable ride and interior roominess, as well as summarizing that Chrysler does not "have a domestic model in this category that's quite as nice."

American Motors offered a special optional warranty program exclusively on the Medallion for the 1988 model year called Ultra Plan, which included scheduled maintenance services. After the Chrysler buyout of American Motors, Chrysler took on responsibility for marketing the 1988 Renault Medallion and supported its financing through Chrysler Credit Corporation until the end of the 1988 model year.

=== 1989 ===
For 1989, Chrysler focused on the advanced technology incorporated in the Eagle models. The 1989 Medallions were also covered by Chrysler's new "7/70 Protection Plan" that was a comprehensive warranty on the entire vehicle for seven years or 70,000 miles (110,000 km). The rear of the 1989 Medallions now featured an "imported for Eagle" badge and the terms of the AMC buyout included the continued sales of Renault-built cars in the U.S. However, Chrysler decided to cease importing the Medallions from Renault at the end of the 1989 model year. This also ended the potential revival of a four-wheel-drive Eagle station wagon.

== Marketing ==
The Eagle name came from the innovative all-wheel drive AMC Eagle line, but the Medallion was a standard passenger car and its sales were also hindered by marketing missteps. Automotive reviews of the Medalion were favorable, but the model was hindered by poor launch into the North American market because of AMC's limited marketing resources. The newly reconfigured Chrysler-Jeep-Eagle dealers also had to deal with the sudden departure of Renault from the market along with a transition to the Chrysler corporate system. The Medallion was also overshadowed by numerous domestic and imported competitors "that were far easier to sell customers into if they were in the market for a sedan or station wagon of this size."

There were also industry rumors of problems at Chrysler with the takeover of AMC that further compromised the Medallion. Kiplinger's Personal Finance magazine raised the question of continued commitment and service for the Medallion after Chrysler's buyout of AMC, but also noted that an expected letter of intent between Chrysler and Renault indicated that Chrysler "would support the vehicle for a minimum of five years." Another problem was Chrysler's announcement of plans to phase out the Medallion sedan in favor of a four-wheel-drive wagon by 1990. However, the Eagle division in the U.S. went without a 4-wheel-drive station wagon model until the launch of the 1992 Eagle Summit Wagon. A four-wheel-drive wagon, the Eagle Vista, was available in Canada from 1989 through 1991.

The Medallion entered into a highly competitive market segment, with total U.S. sales at 25,672 spread over three calendar years. This reflects the struggles the Medallion line faced, with Renault exiting from U.S. market shortly after launch, and Chrysler only wanting to continue sales of highly profitable Jeep models.

The Medallion was ranked as "a damn good car — winning numerous accolades and enjoying a 9-year model run outside the States." Although "it was actually a very nice car to drive," Chrysler discontinued the Medallion soon after purchasing AMC. Robert Lutz, the head of the Chrysler Corporation at the time, said in his 2003 book Guts that the Medallion, and its larger linemate, the Premier were "sales proof" in that no matter how attractive and competitive the cars were, customers in large enough number to ensure success would not take notice.

Chrysler was focused on "import intenders," rather than working with an independent Renault. As a result, the Eagle models became badge engineered cars sourced from its Japanese partner, Mitsubishi Motors, a relationship it had since 1971. At the time, Chrysler was investing in the Diamond-Star Motors manufacturing joint venture and building a new plant in Normal, Illinois, with an annual capacity of almost a quarter-million vehicles. In 1986, Honda introduced their luxury brand Acura with the Acura Legend and Acura Integra thereby further competing in a crowded market segment.

The smaller Eagle Summit made by Mitsubishi was also marketed by Jeep-Eagle dealers, primarily for Alliance and Encore owners to trade into. Still, with the Medallion "they were stuck with for a couple of years due to legal issues with Renault."

The imported Medallion also competed with Chrysler's numerous domestic Dodge, Plymouth, and Chrysler models. This may have also contributed to a lack of enthusiasm within the company for properly marketing the Medallion - as well as the larger Premier.

While the first-generation Summit and the much larger Premier were both replaced, the Medallion line had no successor in the U.S. market, despite the appearance of several D-segment midsize concepts in later years: the Eagle Jazz, a radically shortened front-wheel drive fastback, and the Eagle Optima, an aerodynamic all-wheel-drive sedan. In Canada, the Medallion was replaced by the Mitsubishi Galant-based Eagle 2000GTX.
