= Sno*Drift 2006 =

Sno*Drift 2006 was a car rally held on January 27–29 January as part of the Rally America ProRally and ClubRally series around Atlanta, Michigan. It was the 19th Sno*Drift event held, and the 16th to be held as part of a national series.

== Competitors ==
Forty six teams began the national event. In order of start they were:

	Driver	Co-driver	Car No.	Class	Vehicle
1	Andrew Pinker	Robbie Durant	606	Group N	2004 Subaru WRX STi
2	Ken Block	Alessandro Gelsomino	43	Open	2006 Subaru WRX
3	Travis Pastrana	Christian Edstrom	199	Open	2006 Subaru WRX
4	Andrew Comrie-Picard	Rod Hendricksen	20	Open	1997 Mitsubishi Evo IV
5	Chris Gilligan	Joe Peterson	27	Open	1997 Mitsubishi Evo IV
6	Henry Krolikowski	Cindy Krolikowski	44	Open	2000 Subaru WRX STi
7	Eric Langbein	Jeremy Wimpey	153	PGT	2002 Subaru WRX
8	Norman LeBlanc	Keith Morison	616	PGT	2002 Subaru WRX
9	Robert Borowicz	Mariusz Borowicz	64	Open	2002 Subaru WRX
10	Tanner Foust	Scott Crouch	429	PGT	2002 Subaru WRX
11	Peter Reilly	Phil Assad	987	Open	1994 Volkswagen Golf
12	Cary Kendall	Scott Friberg	26	Open	1990 Eagle Talon
13	Bob Olson	Ryan Johnson	93	PGT	2002 Subaru WRX
14	Jake Himes	Matt Himes	535	PGT	1990 Mitsubishi Eclipse
15	Patrick Moro	Pamela McGarvey	59	PGT	2002 Subaru WRX
16	Greg Drozd	Chris Gordon	84	PGT	2001 Subaru Impreza
17	Eric Burmeister	Dave Shindle	42	Group 5	2001 Mazda Protege
18	Travis Hanson	Terry Hanson	523	PGT	1990 Toyota Celica
19	Bryan Pepp	Jerry Stang	67	PGT	2002 Subaru WRX
20	Tom Young	Jim LeBeau	133	PGT	2004 Subaru WRX
21	David LaFavor	Robert LaFavor	532	PGT	1990 Eagle Talon
22	Tim Smigowski	Christiana Smigowski	540	PGT	1991 Mitsubishi Eclipse
23	Adam Markut	John Nordie	684	PGT	1992 Eagle Talon TSI
24	Kyle Sarasin	Stuart Sarasin	550	Open	1991 Eagle Talon
25	Michael Merbach	Jeff Feldt	98	Production	1990 Volkswagen Jetta
26	Wojciech Okula	Adam Pelc	12	PGT	2002 Subaru WRX
27	Kazimierz Pudelek	Mariusz Malik	16	PGT	2000 Subaru Impreza RS
28	Erik Zenz	David Parps	646	Open	1988 Mazda 323 GTX
29	Jon Hamilton	Ken Sabo	72	Group 5	2000 Volkswagen Golf TDI
30	Evan Moen	Heath Nunnemacher	478	Group 2	2000 Acura Integra R
31	Pete Hascher	Scott Rhoades	598	Group 5	1993 Honda Prelude
32	Greg Woodside	Tom Woodside	680	Group 5	1987 Dodge Shadow
33	Yurek Cienkosz	Lukasz Szela	21	PGT	2002 Subaru Impreza RS
34	Sans Thompson	Craig Marr	49	Production	2000 Dodge Neon
35	Paul Koll	Matt Wappler	744	Group 2	1987 Volkswagen GTI
36	Matt Bushore	Andy Bushore	548	Group 2	1985 Volkswagen Jetta
37	Jim Stevens	Marianne Stevens	491	Production	1992 Suzuki Swift GT
38	Jimmy Brandt	John Atsma	584	Group 5	1987 Volkswagen Golf
39	Jim Kloosterman	Dan Kloosterman	500	Open	1988 Mazda 323
40	Carl Seidel	Jay Martineau	690	Production	1988 Volkswagen Golf GTI 16v
41	Joe Sladovich	Kent Gardam	619	Group 2	1989 Volkswagen Golf GTI
42	Ryan Haveman	Josh VanDenHeuvel	910	Group 5	2003 Dodge Neon SRT-4
43	Jon Miller	Tom McCabe	601	Group 2	1991 Nissan Sentra
44	Karen Purzycki	Bob Pierce	624	Group 2	1980 Ford Fiesta
45	Eric Duncan	Matt Duncan	169	Group 2	1992 Honda Civic CX
46	Mike Gagnon	Bob Martin	480	Production	2000 Ford Focus ZX3
