= Chrysler D platform =

1990 car platform

Chrysler's D platform is the name used by Chrysler for the platform derived from the Mitsubishi Galant and used by the front-wheel drive and all-wheel drive Diamond Star Motors cars in the 1990s. The original D platform debuted in 1990 and was refreshed in 1995 as the PJ platform. Another DSM platform derived from the Galant, the FJ platform, debuted in 1995 for use in the Chrysler Sebring and Dodge Avenger.

== BD ==
- 1990–1994 Mitsubishi Eclipse/Plymouth Laser/Eagle Talon

== PJ ==
- 1995–1999 Mitsubishi Eclipse
- 1995–1998 Eagle Talon

== FJ ==
- 1995–2000 Chrysler Sebring/Dodge Avenger coupes

== ST-22 ==
- 2000–2005 Mitsubishi Eclipse
- 2001–2005 Chrysler Sebring/Dodge Stratus coupes

== See also ==
- Chrysler platforms
- Diamond Star Motors

Chrysler originally used the title D platform in 1957–1973 for the large RWD Imperial.
