= Eagle (automobile) =

Discontinued American automobile brand

- Product type: Passenger and sports cars, luxury sedans
- Current owner: Chrysler Corporation
- Produced by: Chrysler Corporation
- Introduced: 1988
- Discontinued: 1998
- Related brands: Chrysler, Dodge, Mitsubishi
- Markets: United States

Eagle was a brand of the Chrysler Corporation following the purchase of American Motors Corporation (AMC) in 1987 and marketed through the end of the 1998 model year. It was aimed at the enthusiast driver and promoted as more "European" than the automaker's similar models.

Chrysler took the "Eagle" name from the four-wheel drive AMC Eagle models that were introduced for the 1980 model year. This was the last of American Motors' wholly U.S.-designed vehicles, and they have since been described as the first modern mass-production crossover vehicles produced in the U.S. because the "crossover" term had not been coined.

The Eagle name also appeared on several Jeep trim packages and unique models that included the J-10 pickup trucks, the wide-track Cherokee SJ, as well as the CJ-5 and CJ-7 models starting in 1976. American Motors also launched an entirely new front-wheel-drive sedan, the Eagle Premier that was developed with Renault, AMC's French partner before Chrysler purchased AMC.

Various imported and domestic-built vehicles were marketed, primarily by former AMC dealers along with Jeep products, until the brand was discontinued in 1998. The 1993 through 1997 Eagle Vision sedan sold in respectable numbers, with 115,699 built, while the sporty Eagle Talons were made in two generations from 1990 until 1998, with more than 200,000 produced. Most significantly, the Eagle Premier was the basis for Chrysler's successful series of "LH" models that were introduced for the 1993 model year.

== Origin ==
Following the introduction of General Motors' Saturn brand automobile, Chrysler promised a similar new brand designed to take Saturn on with innovative design and building methods. A press release by then Chrysler Chairman Lee Iacocca indicated that the company was working on a car that would be known as the "Liberty" which aimed to achieve significant cost savings. However, these plans never reached fruition. However, Popular Mechanics soon reported that the AMC-developed Premier would replace Chrysler's Liberty project attempts at using the K-car platform. The Liberty name was later applied by Chrysler for a Jeep model marketed in the U.S. starting with the 2002 model year, replacing the AMC-designed Cherokee XJ line.

The main objective of Chrysler acquiring American Motors was the long-established Jeep vehicles, but Renault forced the company to take on the contractual obligations of the passenger car models as part of the deal. Another major factor was that, due to state franchise laws, Chrysler could not start selling Jeeps through their existing dealer networks, nor could ex-AMC dealers begin to sell other Chrysler products. Thus, the Eagle marque was born.

Under new ownership, Chrysler quickly discontinued the domestic-built front-wheel drive Alliance and Encore that were developed under Renault (plans by AMC to import the Renault Espace minivan and the Alpine GTA halo car were also scrapped), but continued to build the four-wheel drive AMC Eagle crossover. It was now called Eagle Wagon and marketed into the 1988 model year until production ended in December. This meant the Brampton Assembly (AMC) manufacturing capacity could be used for making more Jeeps. Moreover, Chrysler kept AMC's long-established Eagle brand by continuing to import the mid-sized Renault 21 (renamed Eagle Medallion) as well as starting production of the Renault 25-based full-size sedan that was developed by AMC (renamed Eagle Premier).

== Marketing ==
To consolidate the marketing and maintain distribution through AMC dealerships following the 1987 acquisition, the Jeep-Eagle division of Chrysler Corporation was formed. Chrysler's initial problem was that unlike the Big Three, which had multiple brands under their corporate name, American Motors had sold passenger cars under its corporate initials of "AMC" since 1970. Thus, without having a separate brand from the now-defunct company, Chrysler management looked to re-brand the legacy vehicles inherited by purchasing AMC under the Eagle name instead of trying to fold those outside-designed products into Chrysler's existing distribution structure. A limiting factor is that almost all states "have dealership-friendly franchise regulations" that do not allow manufacturers flexibility because the laws provide dealerships territorial exclusivity, including protection from new competition, as well as limit dealership franchise termination to the point that even "gross inefficiency and poor financial condition are not legitimate grounds for termination."

Two of Eagle's first models, the Eagle Premier and the Eagle Medallion, were designed by AMC in cooperation with its former corporate partner (and 46.4 percent owner), Renault. The remainder of the brand's cars were rebadged versions of cars sold by other Chrysler Corporation divisions, as well as some captive imports produced by Mitsubishi Motors. At one point, an Eagle variant of Chrysler's popular AS platform minivan was in the planning stages, but this variant never made it to market.

Unlike Chrysler, Dodge, and Plymouth branded automobiles, the Eagle models lacked the Chrysler Corporation "pentastar" logo. Instead, all models prominently featured the Eagle head logo.

Throughout its history, the Eagle brand needed more product recognition, although its Premier was technically more advanced than anything offered by Chrysler. Most of Eagle's models were available in Chrysler-Plymouth, Dodge, and Mitsubishi dealerships under different guises. Chrysler was in financial difficulty at the end of the 1980s and did not have the funds to spread to its new automotive division. Moreover, Jeep vehicles were popular and profitable, so most of the division's marketing resources flowed to the Jeep product range. Since Jeep's products had better recognition and higher profit margins, many dealers emphasized Jeeps. They considered the Eagle line of passenger cars to distract that business. Their sales and service expertise was primarily in the four-wheel drive Jeeps and AMC's Eagle all-wheel-drive models.

Furthermore, the dealership network was realigned following Chrysler's acquisition of AMC. Some former AMC/Jeep dealers were consolidated with Chrysler-Plymouth franchises. Up to this point, Chrysler-Plymouth outlets needed a sport utility vehicle (SUV) to sell, and adding the Jeep line helped dealers offer customers a range of vehicles in a rapidly growing market segment. The merger may have helped the individual dealerships that signed on. Still, it caused the nascent Eagle division and its largely derivative models to compete unfavorably for attention with Chrysler's and Plymouth's often similar, but longer-established and better-recognized lines of passenger cars.

== Phase out ==
The Eagle brand was phased out in stages. In 1996, Chrysler discontinued the Mitsubishi Mirage-based Eagle Summit, having discontinued the nearly identical Dodge Colt and Plymouth Colt models after the 1994 model year. After a decade of slow sales, Chrysler announced the discontinuation of the Eagle brand in September 1997, and the last 1998 Eagle Talon rolled off the line after that. In 1997, the Eagle Vision was discontinued at the end of its design cycle. However, the similar Dodge Intrepid and Chrysler Concorde were redesigned for 1998 and continued through 2004. Only the Mitsubishi Eclipse-based Eagle Talon remained for 1998, after which it and the Eagle brand were discontinued.

Chrysler had initially planned to redesign the Eagle Vision for 1999. Prototypes were spotted wearing the Eagle logo. Vision production continued into September 1997 to provide dealers with enough stock of the older car to carry them through to the new car's introduction. However, Chrysler executives decided to pull the plug on the Eagle brand just a few months later. The car they were working on went on to be marketed as the Chrysler 300M.

The AMC name disappeared with Chrysler's acquisition of the independent automaker, "but the Eagle name carried on, worn by various Renault- and Mitsubishi-sourced models through the 1990s when it was finally retired in 1998." Those Eagle cars failed because the automaker did not have a coherent marketing strategy for the mix of models and they also lacked effective promotional efforts in the automotive marketplace. In the end, "Chrysler wasn't fully committed to the nameplate and also left consumers confused about what an Eagle was -- if they knew the name at all."

== Eagle cars marketed by Chrysler ==
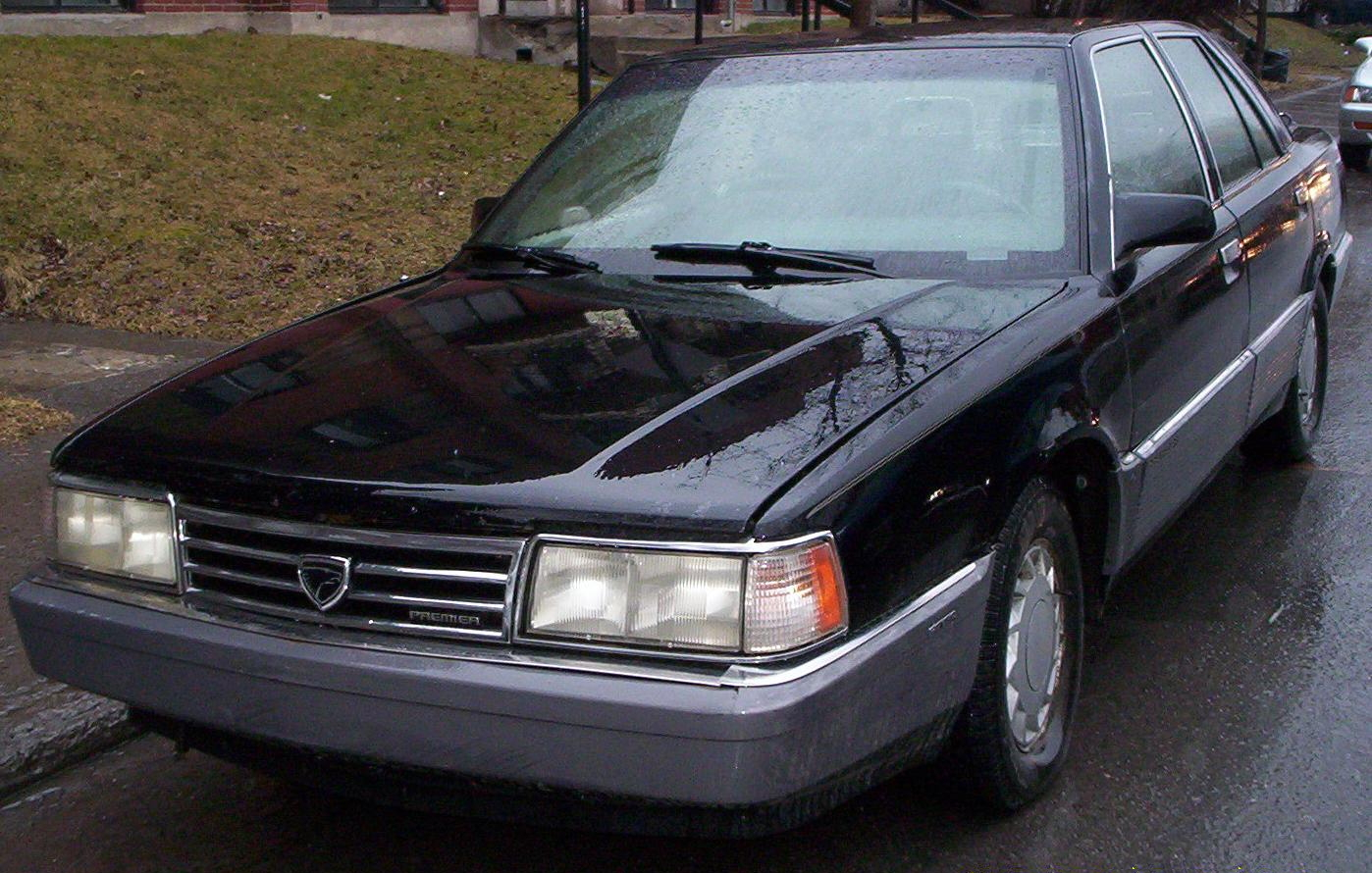
Eagle Premier

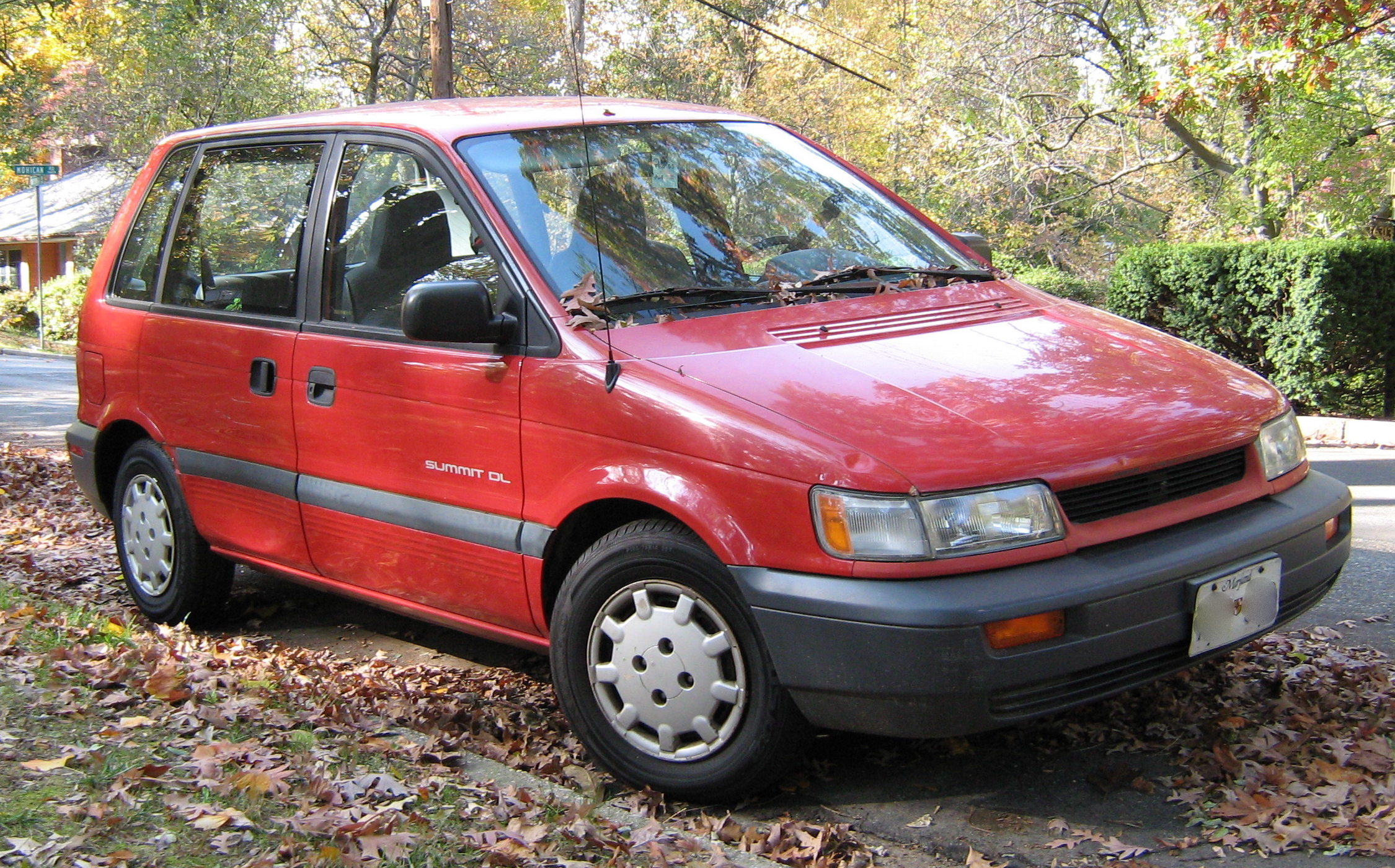
Eagle Summit wagon

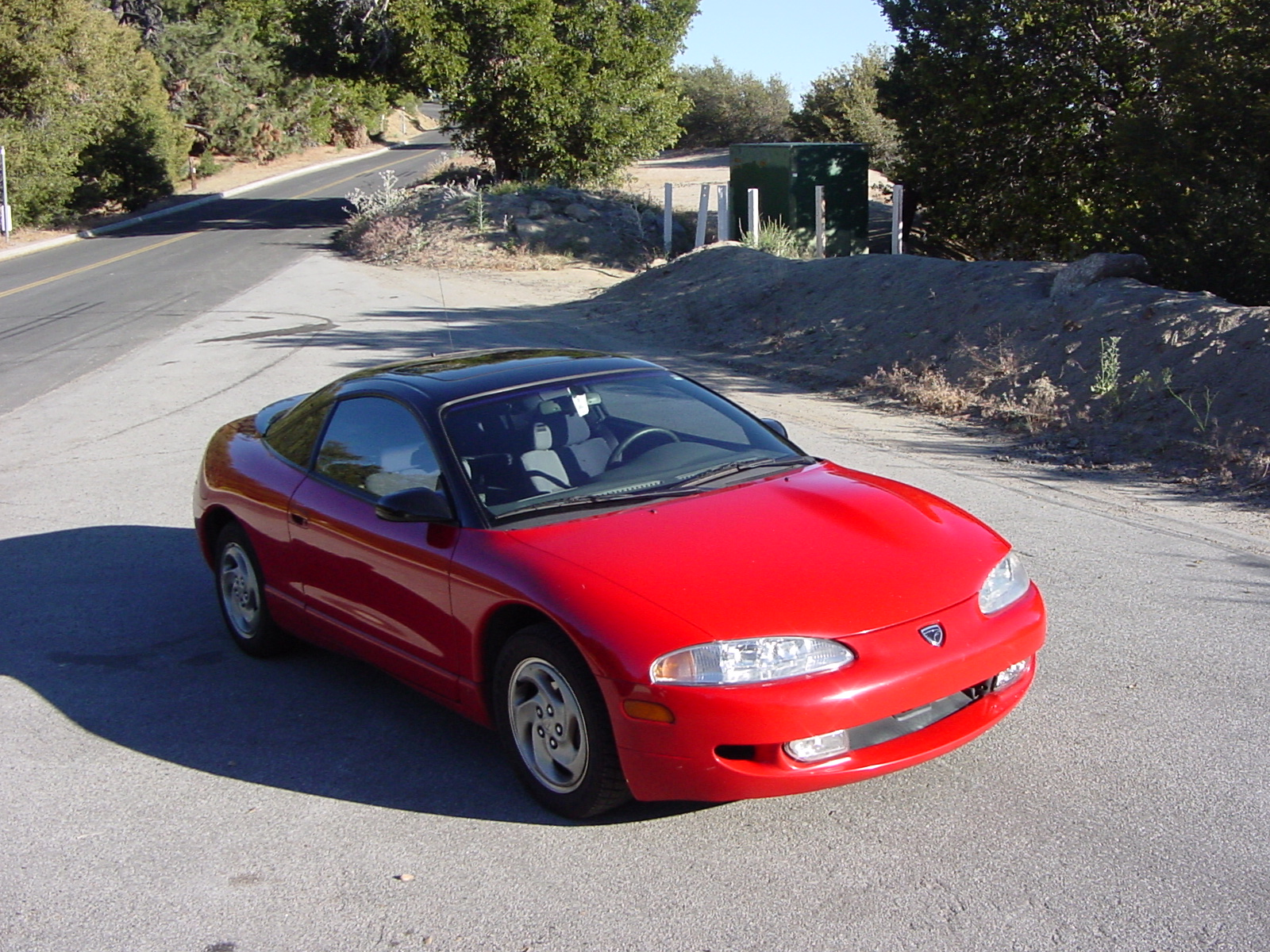
1995 Eagle Talon

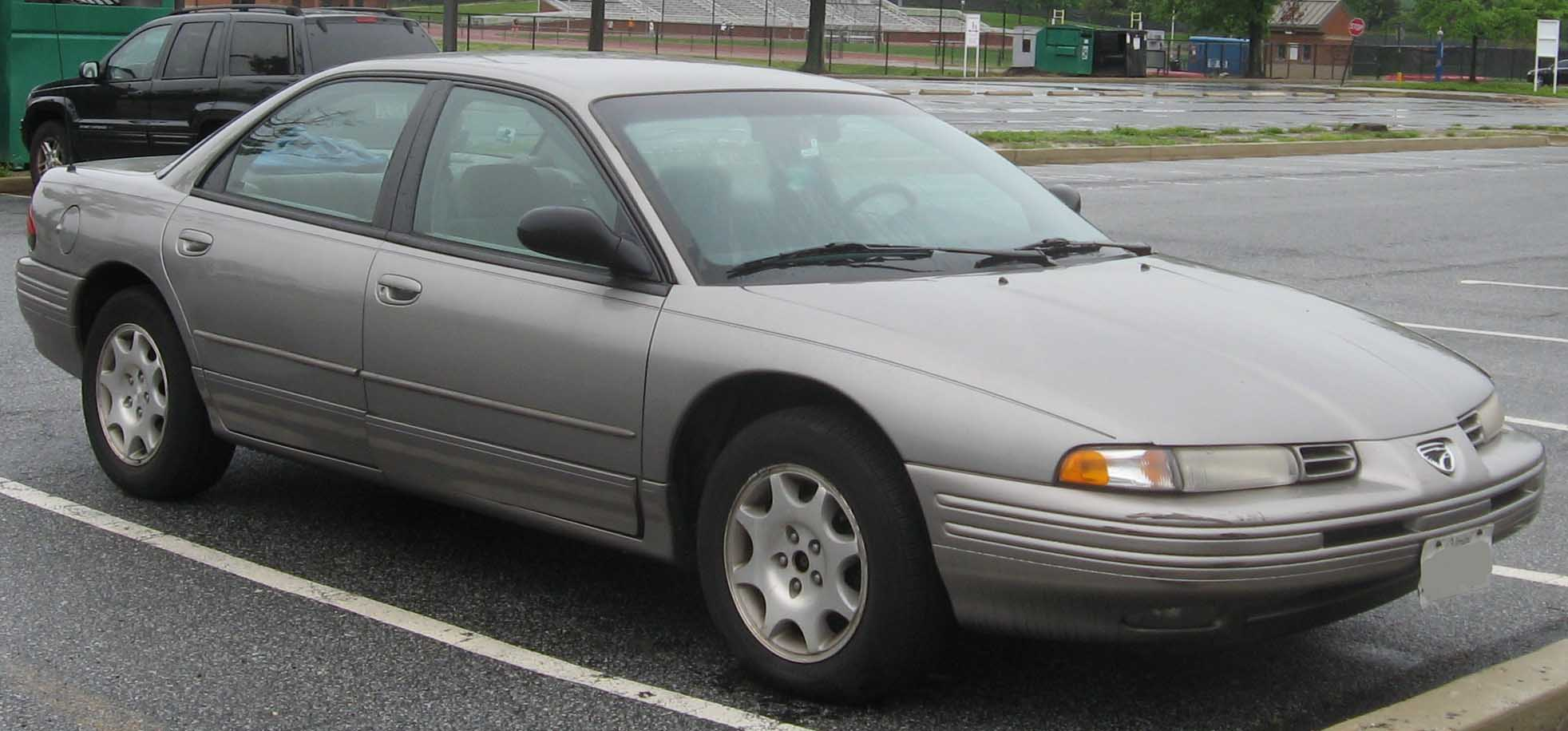
Eagle Vision

- Eagle Wagon (1988)

The continuation of the AMC Eagle line after Chrysler acquired AMC in only the station wagon body style. Production of the crossover vehicle ended on December 14, 1987. According to the National Automobile Dealers Association NADA Guide, Chrysler's "Eagle was spawned from the buyout of American Motors and their AMC Eagle model."

- Eagle Medallion (1989)

Also badged as the Renault Medallion in March 1987 as an early 1988 model, this car was imported from France, rebadged as an Eagle for the 1989 model year only, and was similar to the Renault 21.

- Eagle Premier (1988–1992)

Designed by AMC, the Premier was briefly badged as the Renault Premier before launch. Unusual (for an FWD car) in having a longitudinal engine mounting (to accommodate a future AWD version), it shared several parts with the Renault 25, and spawned a rebadged version named Dodge Monaco (1990–1992); this platform was the basis for the 1993 LH cars.

- Eagle Vista (1988–1992)

Two models were offered. The two-door hatchback and four-door sedan were rebadged Mitsubishi Mirages, and the station wagon (badged as either an Eagle Vista or a Dodge/Plymouth Colt Vista) was a rebadged Mitsubishi Chariot. These cars were marketed only in Canada.

- Eagle Summit (1989–1996)

Coupe, sedan, and wagon models were available. The coupe and 1987-1991 sedans were rebadged Mitsubishi Mirages, while the wagon was a rebadged Mitsubishi Expo LRV. The 1991-1996 sedan was a rebadged Dodge/Plymouth Colt.

- Eagle Talon (1990–1998)

Like the Plymouth Laser and the Mitsubishi Eclipse, the Talon was Eagle's halo car and outsold its Plymouth cousin. (see also Diamond Star Motors)

- Eagle 2000GTX (1991–1992)

A rebadged Mitsubishi Galant four-door sedan. Marketed also as a Dodge only in Canada.

- Eagle Vision (1993–1997)

One of Chrysler's three original LH-cars. It was marketed in Europe as the Chrysler Vision.

== Concept car ==
The Eagle Optima was a 1990 concept car. It was a four-door sedan that used cab forward design and was powered by an experimental, 32-valve all-aluminum V8 engine with all-wheel drive. The Optima was on the show circuit to judge consumer reaction to the thinly disguised version of the LH platform sedans that were to be introduced for the 1993 model year. Two earlier concept cars emphasizing the cab-forward designs that led to the LH-based 1993 Eagle Vision were the 1987 Lamborghini Portofino and the 1989 Chrysler Millennium.

At the 1995 Detroit Auto Show, Chrysler showed the Eagle Jazz Concept, a midsized 4-door liftback sedan based on a shortened LH-car platform. In the US, the Eagle Division had done without a midsized D-segment offering since Chrysler stopped importing Medallions from France in 1989. However, unlike other Chrysler concepts of the era, the Jazz did not lead to a production Eagle model as the Optima before it had.
