= Plymouth Laser =

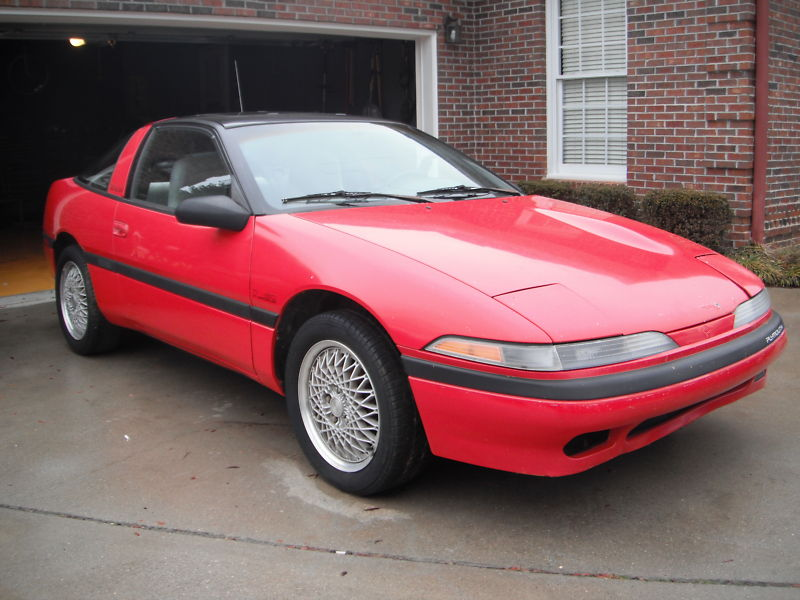

Overview
- Manufacturer: Diamond Star Motors
- Production: 1989–1994
- Model years: 1990–1994
- Assembly: United States: Normal, Illinois (Diamond-Star Motors)

Body and chassis
- Class: Sports car (S)
- Body style: 3-door liftback
- Layout: Transverse front-engine, front-wheel drive / all-wheel drive
- Platform: Chrysler D platform
- Related: Mitsubishi Eclipse; Eagle Talon

Powertrain
- Engine: 1.8 L Mitsubishi 4G37 I4; 2.0 L Mitsubishi 4G63 I4; 2.0 L Mitsubishi 4G63T turbo I4
- Transmission: 5-speed manual 4-speed automatic

Dimensions
- Wheelbase: 97.2 in (2,469 mm)
- Length: 1993-94: 172.8 in (4,389 mm); 1990-92: 170.5 in (4,331 mm)
- Width: 1993-94: 66.7 in (1,694 mm); 1990-92: 66.5 in (1,689 mm)
- Height: 51.4 in (1,306 mm)
- Curb weight: 2,531 lb (1,148 kg)

Chronology
- Predecessor: Plymouth Conquest; Chrysler Laser

The Plymouth Laser is a two-door 2+2 sports coupe sold by Plymouth from 1989 until 1994. The Laser and its siblings, the Mitsubishi Eclipse and Eagle Talon, were the first vehicles produced under the newly-formed Diamond-Star Motors, a joint venture between the Chrysler Corporation and the Mitsubishi Motors Corporation.

== Overview ==
Introduced as "the first Plymouth of the '90s" in advertising, the Plymouth Laser debuted in January 1989 as a 1990 model. The company produced a Chrysler Laser model from 1984 to 1986. The 2-door hatchback was based on the Dodge Daytona model prior to the name badge moving, to the Plymouth brand. Commercials for the 1990 Laser featured R&B singer Tina Turner who appeared in a series of 1990 promotional ads for Plymouth. With three available engines, two transmission offerings, and sporty "aero" styling, the Laser was the most performance-oriented Plymouth since the Barracuda, Duster, and Road Runner muscle cars of the 1970s.

Despite its close resemblance to its Mitsubishi and Eagle siblings, it has several unique styling cues intended to set it apart from the other two. Apart from badging, Lasers sport a race-inspired look, with a plastic panel in the place of a grille, a full rear light-bar, a bulge on the hood for 2.0 L engine models (not necessarily turbocharged), and available stylish "lace" patterned alloy wheels. Rallye Sport (RS), models are set apart from the base models by their black roof with body-colored targa band, power steering, lower bodyside accent striping, and dual power mirrors, as well as an array of options not available on base Lasers.

Base model Lasers carry a 92 hp (69 kW) 1.8 L four-cylinder engine, whereas a 135 hp (101 kW), 2.0 L 16-valve DOHC four-cylinder engine was optional with the Laser RS. The top-of-the-line RS Turbo came equipped with a 2.0 L DOHC 16-valve turbocharged 4-cylinder engine rated at 195 hp (145 kW). A 5-speed manual transmission was standard. A 4-speed automatic was optional, except with the turbocharged engine, which could only be ordered with the manual transmission until 1991 models debuted.

== Model history ==
=== Model year changes ===
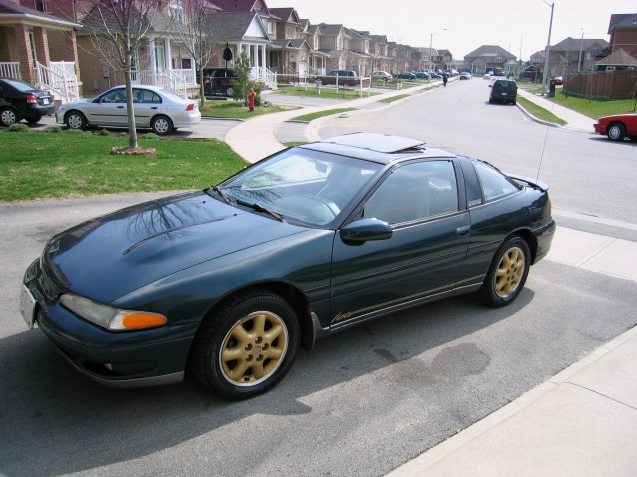
1993 Plymouth Laser (post facelift)

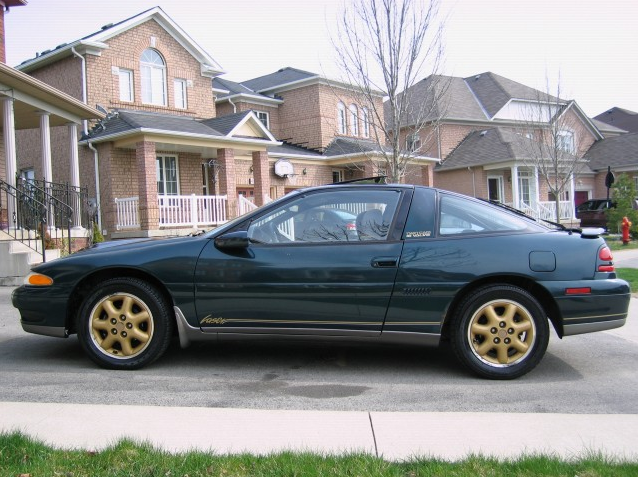
1993 Plymouth Laser RS Gold Edition

1990: the Plymouth Laser was released in January 1989 as a 1990 model. Three models were initially offered: base, RS, and RS Turbo. The similar Mitsubishi Eclipse was also released in 1989, and the Eagle Talon soon followed. The RS models, among other options could be equipped with a factory-installed CD player, a first such option on any Plymouth.

1991: the Laser received anti-lock brakes (ABS), and the turbocharged engine could now be ordered with an automatic transmission.

1992: the Laser received cosmetic changes for 1992, and a new all-wheel-drive (AWD) model joined the lineup. The RS Turbo AWD came only with a manual transmission, while the front-wheel drive version could still be ordered with an automatic. There was also a freshening to the hood and front and rear fascias. The pop-up headlights were removed in favor of multi-form fixed headlights, making the car look more aerodynamic. The rear lightbar was replaced by two separate taillights. The RS model came with alloy wheels and other cosmetic differences. The RS could also be ordered with the Gold Package, which featured gold-trimmed wheels, pin stripes, and graphics. Only a limited number of RSs with this package were built.

1993: AWD Lasers could now be ordered with an automatic transmission. With the automatic, the power rating of turbocharged models dropped to 180 hp (130 kW). All Lasers except for the base model could be equipped with ABS.

1994: Production of the Laser ended on June 3, 1994., due to poor sales. Nothing, including the price, was changed.

Production figures by model year:
1990	42,105
1991	30,198
1992	24,094
1993	14,300
1994	5,284 (production halted mid-year)
Total	115,981

=== Trim levels and prices ===
The original base prices for the Plymouth Laser. Figures are in United States dollars.

	Trim level			
Model year	Base	RS	RS Turbo	RS Turbo AWD
1990	$10,855	$11,900	$13,905	N/A
1991	$10,864	$12,770	$13,954	N/A
1992	$11,184	$13,332	$14,811	$16,853
1993	$11,542	$13,910	$15,444	$17,572
1994	$11,542	$13,910	$15,444	$17,572

=== Engines ===
Engine	Displacement	Power	Torque	Years
1.8 Inline 4	1,755 cm^{3} (107.1 cu in)	92 hp (69 kW) @ 5500	105 lb⋅ft (142 N⋅m) @ 3500	1990 - 1994
2.0 Inline 4	1,997 cm^{3} (121.9 cu in)	135 hp (101 kW) @ 6000	125 lb⋅ft (169 N⋅m) @ 5000	1990 - 1994
2.0 Inline 4 Turbo	1,997 cm^{3} (121.9 cu in)	180 hp (130 kW) @ 5500	195 lb⋅ft (264 N⋅m) @ 3000	1991 - 1994
2.0 Inline 4 Turbo	1,997 cm^{3} (121.9 cu in)	190 hp (140 kW) @ 6000	203 lb⋅ft (275 N⋅m) @ 3000	1990 - 1993
2.0 Inline 4 Turbo	1,997 cm^{3} (121.9 cu in)	195 hp (145 kW) @ 6000	203 lb⋅ft (275 N⋅m) @ 3000	1991 - 1994

== Awards ==
The Laser Turbo was on Car and Driver magazine's Ten Best list from 1989 through 1992.

== Discontinuation ==
The Plymouth Laser was not a major sales success. It did not sell as well as the Eagle Talon, and certainly not as well as the Mitsubishi Eclipse. Several factors influenced this. First, the Laser was a product of badge engineering, therefore it had to compete with two other cars that were virtually identical. Compounding the problem, it faced in-house competition from the Talon, as the Eagle brand was also owned by Chrysler. Where Plymouth was generally marketed as the value-oriented, mainstream brand, Chrysler was trying to market Eagle as their performance brand. Due to this, a much heavier amount of advertising was devoted to the Talon. The fact that the Laser was far different from any other product Plymouth was selling at the time did not help its popularity. In the early 1990s, Plymouth's bread and butter lineup still consisted of K-car-derived cars and minivans; the Laser simply did not fit into this group.

Due to these factors, the Laser was discontinued after a brief run of 1994 models. This failure of badge-engineering was just a preview of what would happen to the whole Plymouth marque in subsequent years. The Laser's discontinuation coincided with the introduction of its successor, the 1995 Plymouth Neon. The Neon was available as a two-door coupe and a four-door sedan and was a far better sales success than the Laser. The Mitsubishi Eclipse and Eagle Talon were both redesigned for 1995. The Talon became Eagle's last surviving model in 1998; the car and the Eagle marque were both dropped after that year. The Eclipse continued until the 2012 model year.

== See also ==
- Eagle Talon
- Mitsubishi Eclipse
- Diamond-Star Motors
