= Eagle Talon =

Sport compact car model marketed by Chrysler

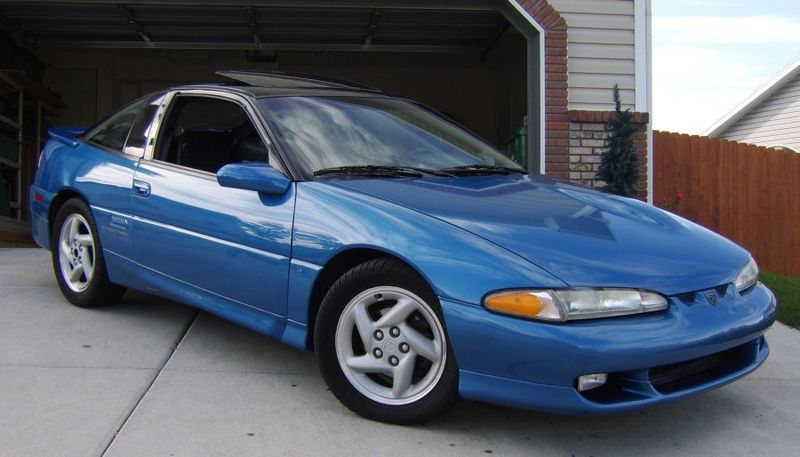
- 1994 Eagle Talon TSi

Overview
- Manufacturer: Diamond-Star Motors for Chrysler Eagle Division (1990–1998); DaimlerChrysler (1998)
- Production: 1989–1998
- Model years: 1990–1998
- Assembly: United States: Normal, Illinois (Diamond-Star Motors)

Body and chassis
- Class: Sport compact car
- Body style: 3-door coupe hatchback
- Layout: Transverse front-engine, front-wheel drive / all-wheel drive

Powertrain
- Transmission: 5-speed manual 4-speed automatic

Chronology
- Successor: Chrysler Sebring coupe Dodge Stratus coupe

The Eagle Talon is a sport compact hatchback coupé. It was manufactured as part of a joint venture between Chrysler and Mitsubishi in two generations starting from the 1990 model year.

The Talon was marketed by Eagle. The rebadged variants were the Plymouth Laser and Mitsubishi Eclipse.

The last model year for the Eagle Talon, as well as the Eagle division of Chrysler, was 1998.

== Characteristics ==
The Talon, Laser, and Eclipse were badge variants using the Chrysler D platform, manufactured at the DSM (Diamond-Star Motors joint venture between Chrysler and Mitsubishi) manufacturing plant in Normal, Illinois. All three vehicles were mechanically identical (when comparing the same option level), including engine, transmission, and drivetrain.

Cosmetically, differences between the three were found in wheels, availability of colors, taillights, front and rear bumpers, and spoilers. The Talon featured a two-tone body color with a black 'greenhouse' (roof, pillars, door-mounted mirrors) regardless of the body color. Available transmissions were a five-speed manual or a four-speed automatic. A hood bulge on the left-hand side of the car was needed for camshaft clearance when equipped with the 4G63 engine. All versions featured this hood design, including the base DL model.

== First generation (1990) ==
First generation
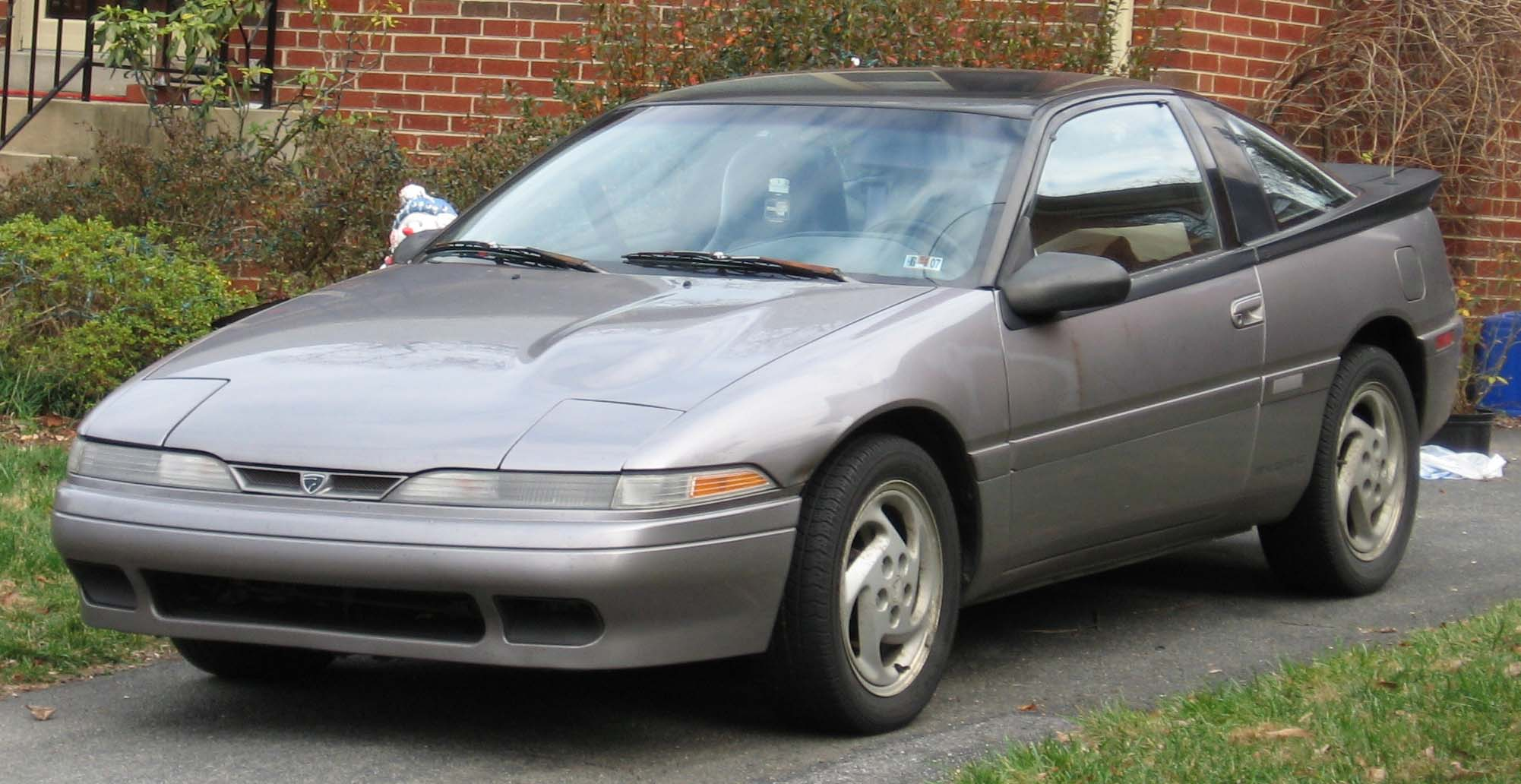
- 1990-1991 Eagle Talon

Overview
- Production: 1989–1994
- Model years: 1990–1994

Body and chassis
- Platform: BD-body
- Related: Mitsubishi Eclipse; Plymouth Laser; Mitsubishi Galant

Powertrain
- Engine: 1.8 L 4G37 I4; 2.0 L 4G63 I4; 2.0 L 4G63T turbo I4

Dimensions
- Wheelbase: 97.2 in (2,469 mm)
- Length: 1990–91: 170.5 in (4,331 mm); 1990–91 TSi: 172.4 in (4,379 mm); 1992–94: 172.8 in (4,389 mm)
- Width: 1990–91: 66.5 in (1,689 mm); TSi and AWD: 66.9 in (1,699 mm); 1992–94: 66.7 in (1,694 mm)
- Height: 51.4 in (1,306 mm); AWD & 1990–91 TSi: 52.0 in (1,321 mm)

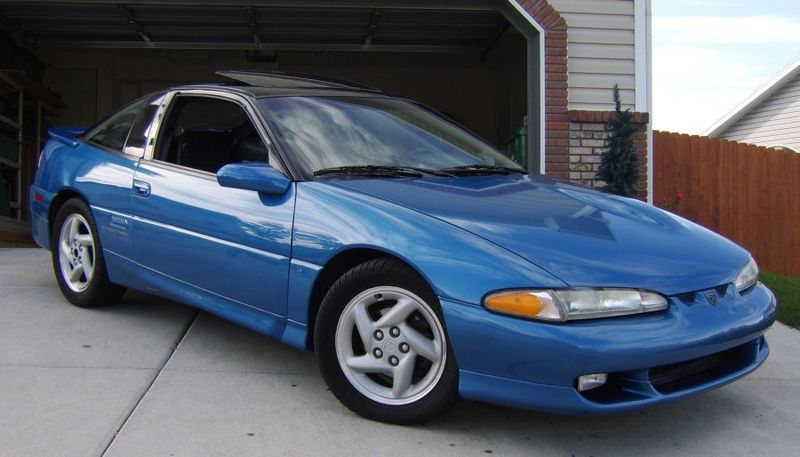
1992-1994 Eagle Talon

The first-generation Talon was released in mid-1989 as a 1990 model and continued through 1994. This era of DSM vehicles is referred to as the first-generation, or "1G". However, there were two 1G styles. The 1990 and 1991 "1GA" models featured pop-up headlights and a "6-bolt" engine, while the 1992 through 1994 "1GB" models featured exposed composite-style headlights with integrated turn signals and a "7-bolt" engine. (Note: The bolts refer to the number of bolts on the flywheel that connect to the crankshaft.)

The 1993 and 1994 base model DL was front-wheel drive and included a 92 hp (69 kW; 93 PS) 1.8 L engine (4G37). The ES model (or just the base Talon before 1993) included a naturally aspirated 2.0 L 135 hp (101 kW; 137 PS) Mitsubishi 4G63 engine. The TSi and TSi AWD models used the same engine but added an intercooled Mitsubishi 14b turbocharger producing 11 psi (0.8 bar), rated at 195 hp (145 kW; 198 PS) on TSi AWD models. The front-wheel-drive TSi model was rated at 190 hp (142 kW; 193 PS) due to a restrictive exhaust system, and the automatic transmission versions were rated at 180 hp (134 kW; 182 PS) due to a smaller 13g turbo. The 1990 turbo models were only available with a five-speed manual transmission.

All 1G Talons (and DSMs) built after VIN xxxxxxxxNE005602 or from May 1992, received a freer revving "7-bolt" bottom-end engine that was also used in the new 1992 Mitsubishi Lancer Evolution. The engine included lighter connecting rods, a 7-bolt lighter crankshaft, as well as a larger one-piece crankshaft girdle and bracing.

=== 1G trim levels ===
- Eagle Talon base – 1990–1992
- TSi FWD Turbo – 1990–1994
- TSi AWD Turbo – 1990–1994
- DL – 1993–1994
- ES – 1993–1994

=== Production numbers ===
- 1990: 32,708
- 1991: 33,537
- 1992: 27,945
- 1993: 26,740
- 1994: 24,040

Total: 144,970

=== Awards ===
The Eagle Talon TSi and TSi AWD were on Car and Driver magazine's 10 Best list for 1990, 1991 and 1992. Talon models also shared the "10 Best" designation with the other Mitsubishi versions from 1989 through 1992.

== Second generation (1995) ==
Second generation
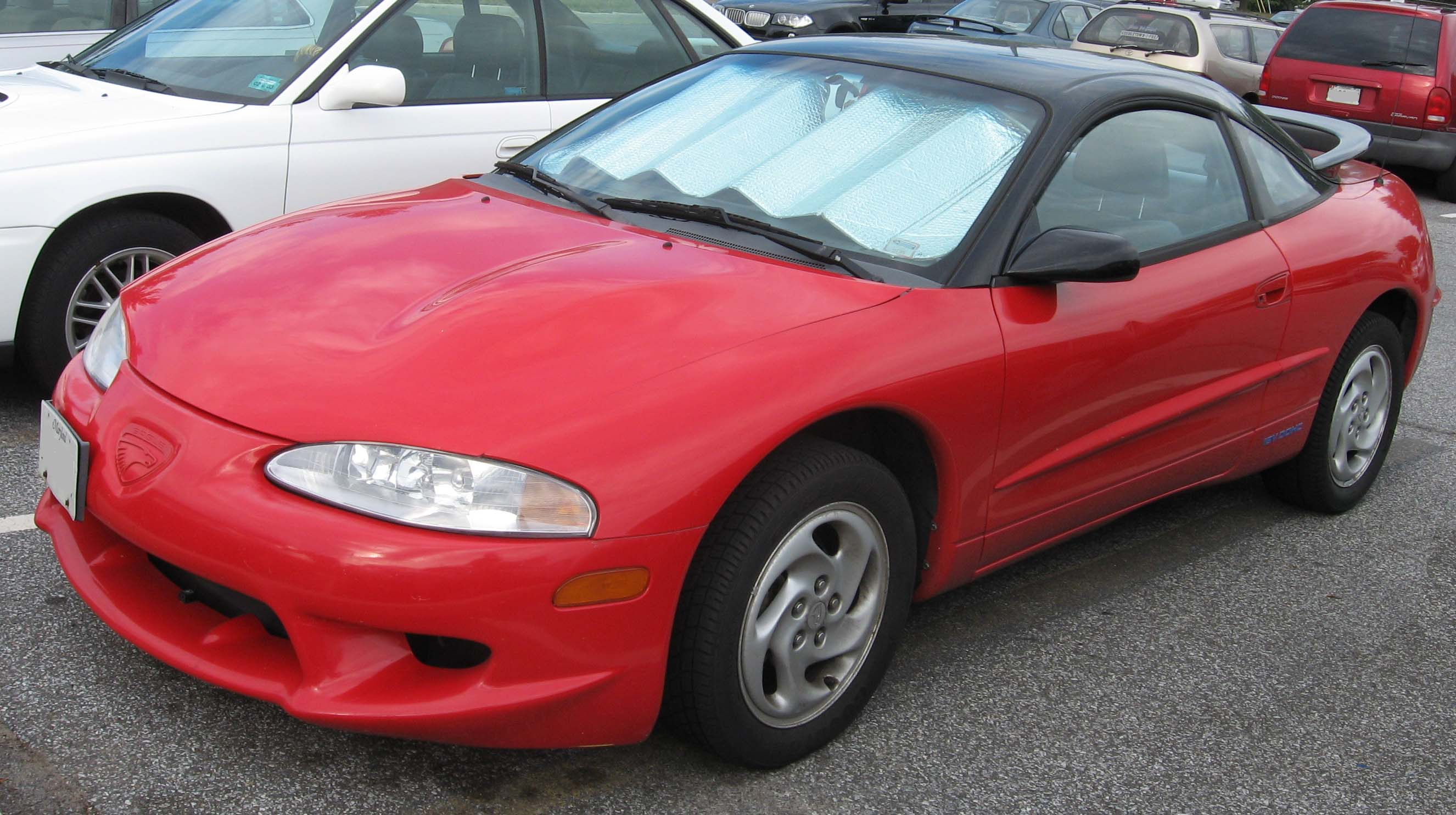
- 1997–1998 Eagle Talon

Overview
- Production: 1995 – February 10, 1998
- Model years: 1995–1998

Body and chassis
- Body style: 2-door coupe
- Platform: PJ-body
- Related: Mitsubishi Eclipse

Powertrain
- Engine: 2.0 L 420A I4; 2.0 L 4G63T turbo I4

Dimensions
- Wheelbase: 98.8 in (2,510 mm)
- Length: 1995–96: 172.2 in (4,374 mm); 1997–98: 174.8 in (4,440 mm)
- Width: 1995–96: 68.7 in (1,745 mm); 1997–98: 69.9 in (1,775 mm); ESi: 68.3 in (1,735 mm)
- Height: 49.8 in (1,265 mm); AWD: 50.5 in (1,283 mm)

The second-generation (or "2G") Eagle Talon was introduced in 1995 simultaneously with its Mitsubishi Eclipse counterpart, while the Plymouth Laser version was discontinued. Mechanically, the new Talon and Eclipse models were almost identical to the engines in the turbocharged versions with an increase in output due to a redesigned intake and exhaust, higher 8.5:1 (vs. 7.8:1) compression pistons, and new turbocharger. The new T25 turbocharger, sourced from Garrett, had a boost increase to 14 psi (1.0 bar) of peak boost and was smaller than the previous Mitsubishi built 14b turbo that was on 1G models. The T25 spooled up faster than the previous turbocharger to increase the turbo response and reduce turbo lag.

While the 1G had MacPherson struts in the front, the 2G had double wishbone in the front and multilink suspension in the rear. The double-wishbone suspension improved the roll-camber curve in the front for better handling.

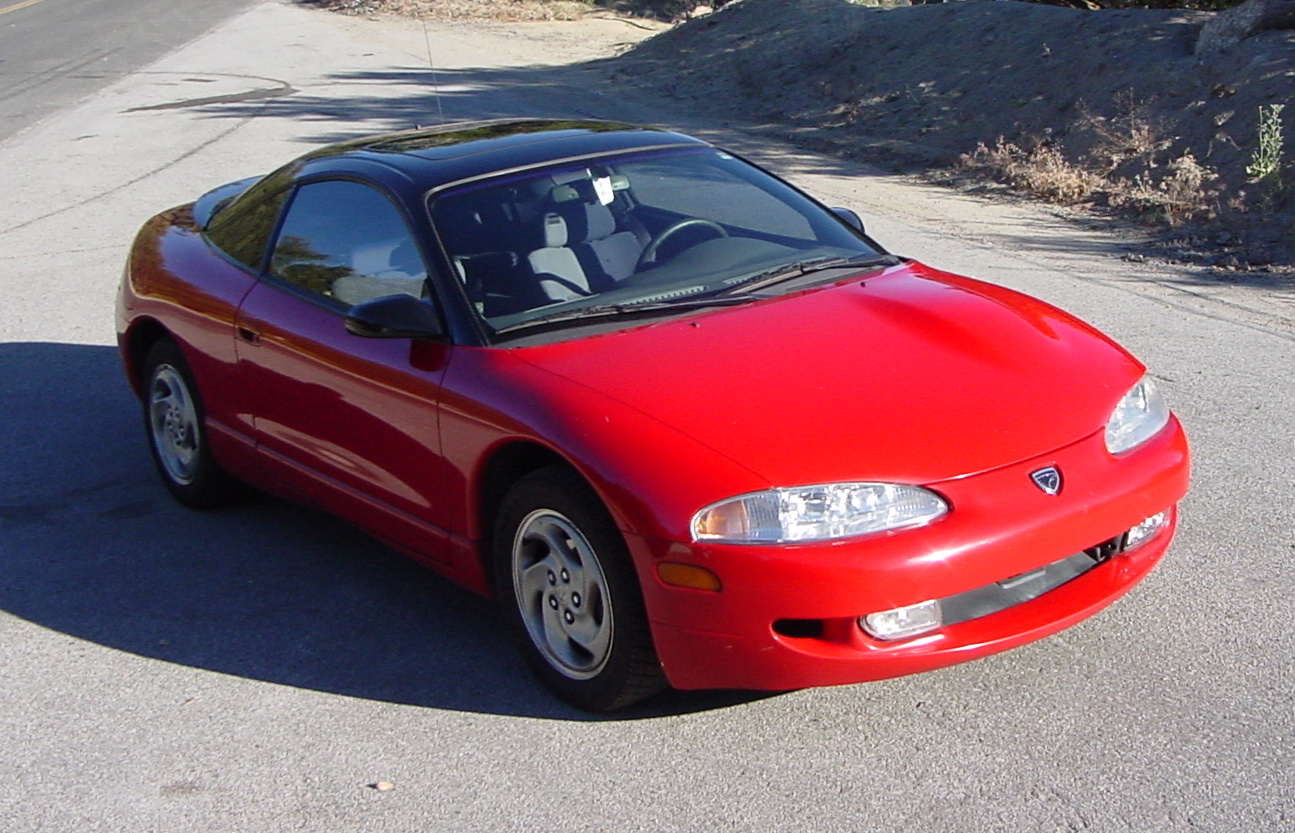
1995 Eagle Talon TSi

The differences between the Eagle Talon and its Mitsubishi equivalent were more substantial than in the first-generation models. The rear fascia of the Talon featured a bumper cap with a dip in the middle to allow for a high-mounted rear license plate; rear light clusters incorporating amber turn signals (the Eclipse used red turn signals); reverse lights as part of the main rear tail light clusters (the Eclipse's reverse lights were mounted separately and lower around the mid-mounted license plate); and a sickle-shaped rear spoiler for the TSi and TSi AWD version mounted at the base of the rear window that was painted black regardless of body color (the Eclipse used a body-colored, conventional "basket handle" spoiler mounted on the rear deck). ESi models (non-turbo) did not receive side skirts, while TSi and TSi AWD models received side skirts that had the words "16V DOHC TURBO" embossed on the sections behind the doors and ahead of the rear wheels. Minor differences in the front bumper included the lack of a body-colored splitter in the central air intake compared to the Eclipse, slightly differently shaped fog lamps, and the entire air intake section was recessed into the bumper cover compared to the flush intakes of the Eclipse. The Talon featured a black roof while the Eclipse had a body-colored top. Lastly, the "Eagle" and either "ESi", "TSi", or "TSi AWD" badges were embossed, body-colored plastic that was glued to the rear bumper below the taillights on the Talon, while the Eclipse used simple stickers placed on the hatch to denote make and trim level.

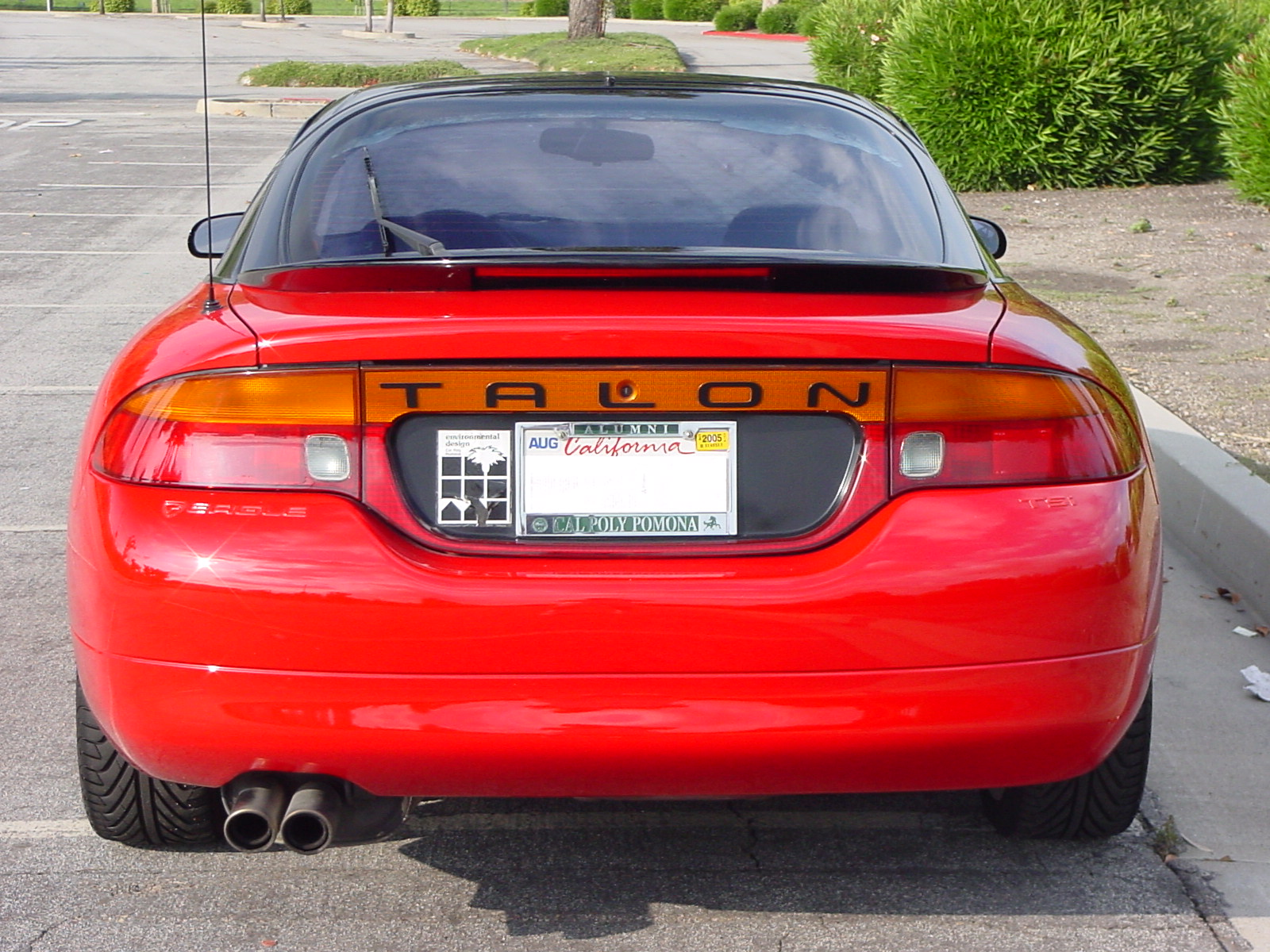
1995 Eagle Talon TSi. Amber turn signals, integrated reverse lights, and bumper cap comprise the rear fascia

For the 1997 model year, a design update occurred for both the Talon and the Eclipse that is sometimes referred to as "2Gb". The front and rear fascias were heavily revised to incorporate more aggressive-looking features. At the front, a larger air intake was created and the "Eagle" emblem was enlarged and embossed into the center of the bumper cap (as opposed to a badge that inset into a similarly shaped hole). A new high-mount spoiler replacing the previous flush-mounted "sickle" spoiler. Side skirts were dropped from TSi and TSi AWD models. Embossed lettering "16V DOHC TURBO" was added between the doors and rear wheels. All badging on the sides and rear of the car was now changed to contrasting colors instead of body-colored. Plastic moldings on the bumper caps and doors were added. The TSi and TSi AWD models' aluminum wheels were increased to 17 in (432 mm) and the styling was angular replacing the 16 in (406 mm) curved design of the wheel's five-spokes.

The TSi and TSi AWD models again featured an intercooled turbocharged engine, now replacing the 14B Mitsubishi turbo with a Garrett T25 model. Although the T25 was a smaller turbo, it spooled faster at a lower rpm resulting in increased low-end acceleration performance. The TSi AWD model retained the all-wheel drive drivetrain.

=== Engines ===
- ESi – 2.0 L DOHC 2.0 L Chrysler 420A engine naturally aspirated I4, 140 hp (110 kW) at 6000 rpm and 130 pound-feet (180 N⋅m) at 4,800 rpm
- TSi / TSi AWD manual transmission – DOHC 2.0 L Mitsubishi 4G63 turbo I4, 210 hp (157 kW) at 6,000 rpm and 205 lb⋅ft (278 N⋅m) at 3,000 rpm
- TSi / TSi AWD automatic transmission – DOHC 2.0 L Mitsubishi 4G63 turbo I4, 205 hp (153 kW) at 6,000 rpm and 220 lb⋅ft (298 N⋅m) at 3,000 rpm

=== Standard equipment ===
ESi: 2.0 liter DOHC I4 engine, five-speed manual transmission, four-wheel disc brakes, driver and passenger airbags, variable-assist power steering, cloth reclining front bucket seats, folding rear seat, front console with storage and armrest, tinted glass, tachometer, coolant temperature gauge, trip odometer, map lights, dual remote mirrors, visor mirrors, AM/FM radio, digital clock, remote fuel door and hatch releases, tilt steering column, intermittent wipers, rear wiper/washer, rear spoiler, color-keyed bodyside moldings, 195/70R14 tires, and wheel covers.

TSi added: turbocharged engine, sport-tuned exhaust system, upgraded suspension, driver's seat lumbar support adjustment, split-folding rear seat, leather-wrapped steering wheel and manual gearshift handle, power mirrors, turbo boost and oil pressure gauges, cassette player, lighted visor mirrors, rear defogger, cargo-area cover, cargo net, lower bodyside cladding, fog lamps, 205/55/R16 tires, and alloy wheels.

TSi AWD added: permanent all-wheel drive, cruise control, power door locks and windows, 215/55/VR16 tires.

=== Optional equipment ===
Eagle offered option packages and equipment that could be added individually. Option Packages:

- Pkg 21B/22B, ESi: Air conditioning, cruise control, rear defogger, power mirrors, cassette player, cargo area cover, front floor mats. Pkg 22B requires a four-speed automatic transmission.
- Pkg 21C/22C, ESi: Pkg 21B/22B plus power windows and door locks, cargo net, upgraded interior trim. Pkg 22C required a four-speed automatic transmission.
- Pkg 23P/24P, TSi: Air conditioning, cruise control, power windows and door locks, front floor mats. Pkg 24P required automatic transmission.
- Pkg 25S/26S, TSi AWD: Air conditioning, front floor mats. Pkg 26S required automatic transmission.
- Pkg 25L/26L, TSi AWD: Pkg 25S/26S plus power driver's seat, leather/vinyl front upholstery, CD/cassette player with graphic equalizer, power sunroof, remote keyless entry with a security alarm. Pkg 26L required automatic transmission.

Optional Equipment:

- Four-speed automatic transmission, ESi, TSi, TSi AWD. TSi AWD included 205/55/VR16 tires.
- Anti-lock brakes
- Limited-slip differential, TSi AWD
- Air Conditioning
- Remote keyless entry with security alarm, ESi w/ Pkg 21C/22C, and TSi AWD w/ Pkg 25S/26S
- Rear defogger, ESi
- Cassette/CD Player, ESi w/ Pkg 21C/22C, TSi w/ option pkg, TSi AWD w/ Pkg 25S/26S. Credit back w/ pkg 25L/26L.
- Cassette/CD player with a graphic equalizer (includes 8 Infinity speakers) TSi w/ option pkg, TSi AWD w/ Pkg 25S/26S
- Power sunroof, ESi w/ Pkg 21C/22C
- Leather/vinyl upholstery, TSi w/ option pkg, and TSi AWD w/ Pkg 25S/26S
- Power driver's seat, TSi w/ option pkg or TSi AWD w/ Pkg. 25S/26S
- Homelink, requires option pkg. (1996–1998 only)
- Alloy wheels, ESi w/ option pkg

=== Production numbers ===
- 1995: 25,066
- 1996: 15,100
- 1997: 9,788
- 1998: 4,308

Total: 54,262

=== Discontinuation ===
By 1998, the Talon was the last model in the declining Eagle lineup and the rarest Talon model year. Amid declining sales, Chrysler management decided to stop promoting the Eagle brand. The last Eagle Talon rolled off the assembly line on February 10, 1998.

== Eagle Jazz ==
In 1994, a concept car called the Eagle Jazz was developed for the 1995 automobile show circuit. "It was a sporty sedan with a rounded hatchback tail. Built into that was a hatch-within-a-hatch, so a driver could easily open the rear end to store cargo." It was considered by some to have "a strange resemblance to a 4-door Eagle Talon". Some of the Eagle Jazz concept designs and ideas resurfaced in the second-generation Chrysler Concorde.

== Motorsport ==
The Talon won the SCCA World Challenge touring car championship from 1990 until 1991 and the GT Touring championship from 1993 through 1995. Along with Oldsmobile (Achieva 1992–1994), Eagle is one of only two American brands to win the TC championship in the 1990s. As of 2020, GM's Oldsmobile Achieva and Chevy Sonic (TCB) have accomplished this feat, along with Chrysler's Eagle Talon. The Dodge Shelby Charger won SSA of the predecessor SCCA / Escort Endurance Championship in 1986, and its Eagle Talon TSI AWD won SSA in 1989.

- 1989 - AWD Turbo - Escort Endurance Class A Championship for co-drivers Bobby & Tommy Archer
- 1990 - FWD Turbo - Escort World Challenge Super Production Class Championship for driver Bobby Archer
- 1991 - FWD Non-Turbo - Escort World Challenge Super Production Class Championship for driver Mitch Wright
- 1992 - FWD Non-Turbo - Escort World Challenge Class D Championship for driver Neil Hanneman
- 1993 - FWD Turbo - Escort World Challenge Class B Championship for driver Willy Lewis
- 7 straight SCCA Pro Racing Championships - Eagle Talon HKS & Archer Racing dominated

== The TSi name ==
Before the introduction of the Talon, the TSi (Turbo Sport Intercooled) nameplate was used on the 1986 through 1989 Mitsubishi Starion wide-body versions that were marketed as Dodge, Plymouth, or Chrysler Conquest model.

The TSi nameplate was used on a version of the Jeep Grand Cherokee (ZJ) during 1997 and 1998. Marketed as a sportier model, the TSi featured a monochromatic paint scheme with indigo-blue accented trim, a styling feature that was previously available on the Talon.

The TSi name reappeared, as a high-performance model for the Chrysler Sebring sedan, for the 2005 and 2006 model years.
