= Diamond-Star Motors =

Automobile-manufacturing joint venture

Coordinates: 40°30′32″N 89°3′16″W

Mitsubishi Motors North America, Inc. Manufacturing Division
- Formerly: Diamond-Star Motors (1985–1995); Mitsubishi Motors North America (2002–2016)
- Type: Joint venture
- Industry: Automotive
- Founded: October 1985
- Founders: Chrysler Corp. Mitsubishi Motors
- Defunct: November 2015; 10 years ago
- Fate: Chrysler sold its equity stake to Mitsubishi in 1993, which became the sole owner Plant acquired by Rivian in 2017
- Headquarters: 100 N. Mitsubishi Motorway, Normal, Illinois 61761, United States
- Key people: Jerry Berwanger (EVP, COO); Hideyasu Tagaya (Chairman, MMNA)
- Products: Automobiles
- Brands: Chrysler; Dodge; Eagle; Mitsubishi; Plymouth
- Owner: Chrysler (1985–1993); Mitsubishi Motors (1985–2016); Rivian (2017-Present)
- Number of employees: 1,900
- Parent: Mitsubishi North America

Mitsubishi Motors North America, Inc. Manufacturing Division (originally, Diamond-Star Motors) was an automobile-manufacturing joint venture between the Chrysler Corporation and Mitsubishi Motors. The name came from the parent companies' respective logos: three diamonds (Mitsubishi) and a pentastar (Chrysler).

Diamond-Star Motors was officially renamed "Mitsubishi Motor Manufacturing of America, Inc." (MMMA) in 1995, four years after Mitsubishi took sole control of the plant, and from 2002 to 2016 its official name had been "Mitsubishi Motors North America", Inc.", and "Manufacturing Division".

In the automotive enthusiast community, DSM, especially used in the singular (e.g. a DSM) generally refers to the original first- and second-generation Mitsubishi Eclipse, Eagle Talon, and Plymouth Laser, which all shared the same Diamond-Star Motors vehicle platform.

In January 2017, Rivian acquired the plant and its manufacturing contents for $16 million, as its primary North American manufacturing facility.

== History ==
=== Background ===
The origins of Diamond-Star Motors can be traced back to 1970 when Chrysler took a 15 percent stake in Mitsubishi Motors, as part of MMC's strategy of expansion through alliances with foreign partners. The U.S. company began distributing Mitsubishis as Chrysler-, Dodge-, and Plymouth-branded captive imports (e.g. Dodge Colt), a successful venture as the compact cars met consumer demand for smaller and more fuel-efficient vehicles in the 1970s, filling a gap at the bottom of the Chrysler group's range.

By 1982, Chrysler was importing 110,000 Mitsubishis annually. However, a minor conflict was forming as the Japanese now wanted to sell directly through their own-branded dealerships. A voluntary import quota system was in place at this time, restricting the number of cars Japanese automakers could bring into the U.S. As the Japanese company began to open its own branded dealerships to sell directly, every imported Cordia, Tredia, and Starion sold by Mitsubishi had to be discounted from Chrysler's allocation. Another point of contention was that Chrysler had the right of first refusal of any Mitsubishi automobiles in the US market until 1990.

=== Incorporation ===
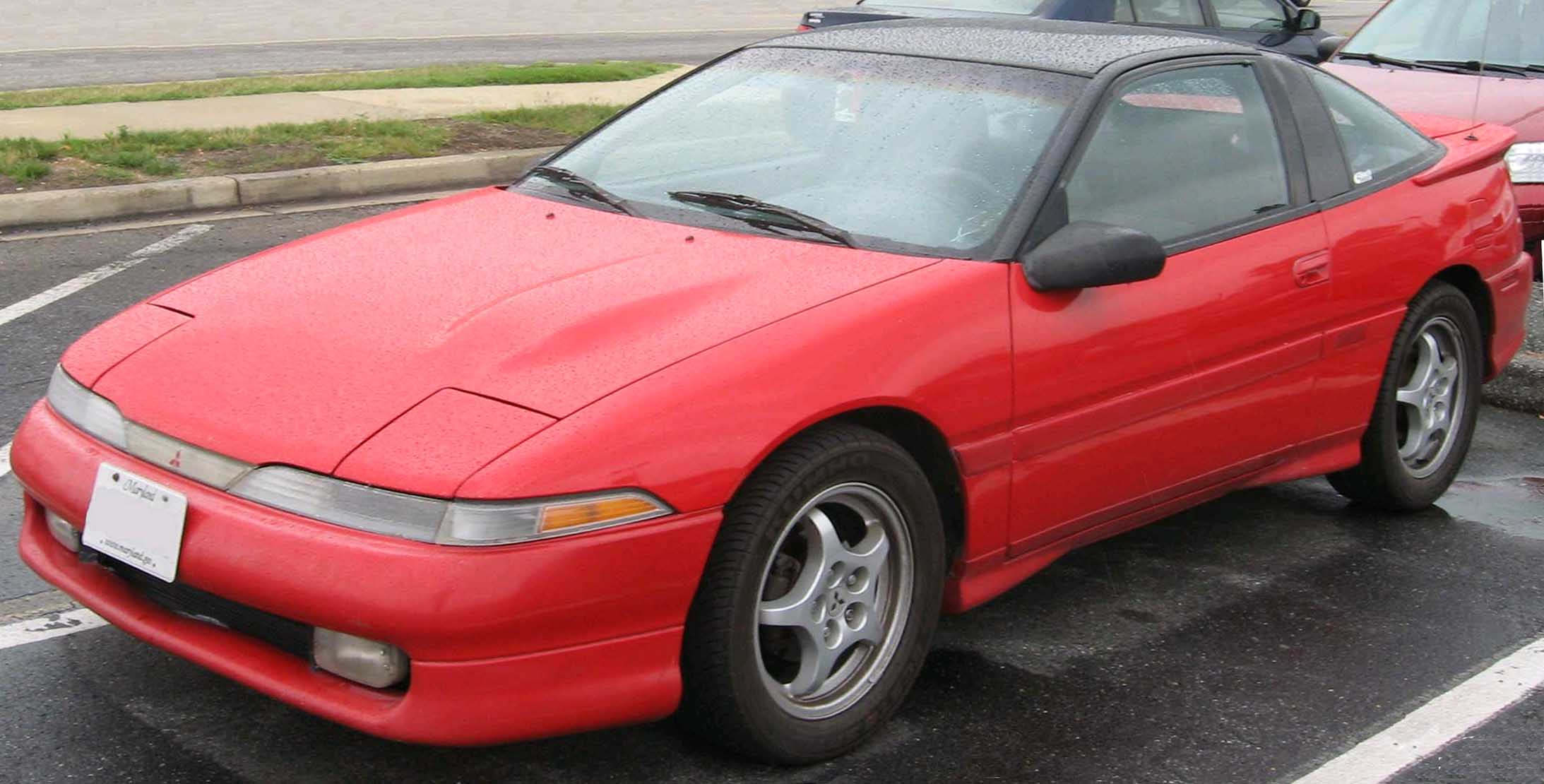
A 1990–91 Eclipse, the first Mitsubishi-badged vehicle built at the Diamond-Star Motors facility

In order to circumvent this, the two partners officially incorporated Diamond-Star Motors in October 1985. An incentive package worth US$274 million, and an intense and controversial lobbying effort by state and local government authorities, meant that Illinois won the new auto plant, and in April 1986 ground was broken on a 1,900,000 sq ft (180,000 m^{2}) production facility in the town of Normal. The plant was completed in March 1988, with an annual capacity of 240,000 vehicles. In 1989, the workers at the plant formed United Auto Workers Local 2488, and signed their first contract with the company.

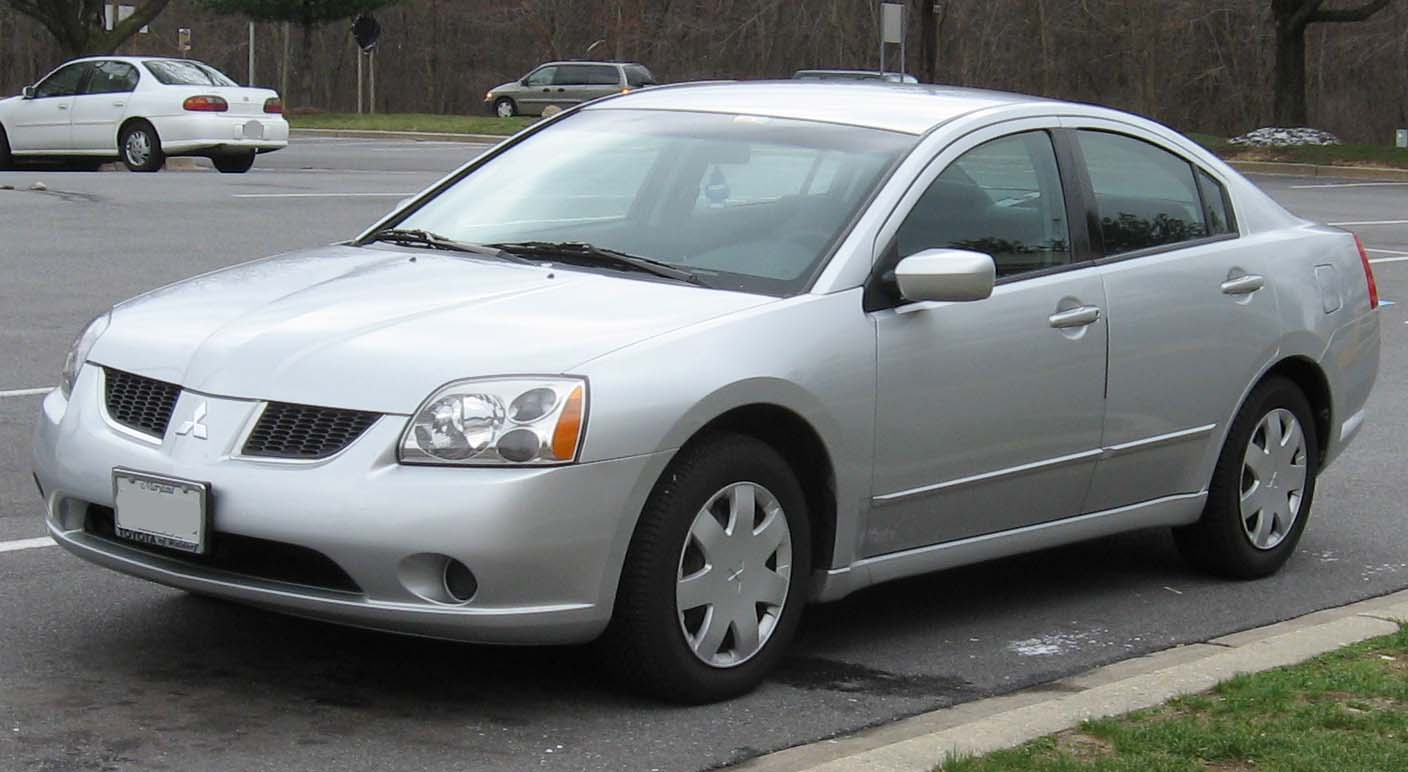
The ninth generation of the Galant sedan was originally designed and built exclusively for the North American market, and was MMMA's volume seller.

Initially, three models were produced at this facility. The Mitsubishi Eclipse, Plymouth Laser, and Eagle Talon were smaller 2+2 sports cars on a new co-designed platform. Models subsequently produced during the next decade included the Mitsubishi Mirage/Dodge/Plymouth Colt/Eagle Summit sedans, the Mitsubishi Galant, the Dodge Avenger Coupe/Chrysler Sebring Coupe, and the Dodge Stratus Coupe.

=== Departure of Chrysler ===
Initially Diamond-Star Motors was a 50–50 joint venture between Chrysler and Mitsubishi. However, in 1991 the Japanese company purchased its partner's interest, and thereafter the manufacture of Chrysler vehicles was on a contractual basis. Chrysler sold its equity stake to Mitsubishi in 1993, and Diamond-Star Motors was renamed Mitsubishi Motors Manufacturing America (MMMA) on July 1, 1995. Despite the departure, the two companies have maintained various co-operative manufacturing agreements since and considered all vehicles produced until 1995 as Diamond-Star Motors.

Formerly, the plant produced vehicles using the American-developed Mitsubishi PS platform, including the Endeavor, Galant, and Eclipse. An expansion in 2003 enlarged the plant to 2,400,000 sq ft (220,000 m^{2}). In mid-2012, the plant began producing the Mitsubishi ASX which is sold in United States as the Outlander Sport. Approximately 1,900 people worked in the highly mechanized plant, alongside approximately 1,000 robots.

=== Closure and sale of the plant to Rivian ===
In July 2015, Mitsubishi announced that it would end production at the plant in Normal. The plant had been operating well below capacity for several years. In 2014, it produced just over 61,000 vehicles out of a capacity of 240,000 vehicles annually. Production would shift to Japan, with Mitsubishi importing all vehicles sold in North America. Mitsubishi said it would try to sell the plant to preserve jobs, but that the plant would be closed by November if no buyer was found. Ultimately a buyer was not found in time, and production ended on the 30th of November. Most of the workers (900 out of 1200) were let go on that date, with the rest staying to build replacement parts until the final closure of the plant in May 2016. Eventually the plant was sold to Maynards Industries, an auctioning and liquidation firm, with ownership to transfer June 1, 2016.

In January 2017, Rivian acquired the plant and its manufacturing contents for $16 million, as Rivian's primary North American manufacturing facility. Rivian's acquisition of an almost production-ready facility instead of building a new factory was likened to Tesla's acquisition of the NUMMI plant in California.

In May 2024, Rivian announced a planned $1.5 billion expansion of the facility to produce the R2 midsize SUV, supported by an $827 million state incentive package over 30 years from the Illinois Department of Commerce and Economic Opportunity. The expansion spans more than 2.1 million square feet and includes a new 1.1 million-square-foot building for body shop, general assembly, and end-of-line operations, bringing plant capacity to approximately 215,000 vehicles annually.

== Production ==
Year	Vehicles
1988	2,206
1989	90,609
1990	148,532
1991	153,526
1992	140,156
1993	135,610
1994	170,318
1995	218,507
1996	193,013
1997	189,023
1998	157,364
1999	162,199
2000	222,414
2001	193,780
2002	204,234
2003	173,872
2004	113,253
2005	87,791
2006	92,499
2007	78,771
2008	59,018
2009	18,502
2010	29,375
2011	31,114
2012	47,837
2013	69,766
2014	61,974
2015	38,186
Total	3,283,449

(source: MMNA Production History and Facts and Figures 2016)
