= Sundancer (disambiguation) =

Sundancer is a proposed space habitat built by Bigelow Aerospace.

Sundancer may also refer to:

- A participant in the Native American ceremony known as the Sun Dance
- Sundancer, a cape from the web serial Worm.
- Sundancer (album), an album by Fair Warning
- "Sundancer", a song from the Keldian album Heaven's Gate
- "Sundancer", an episode of the television series The Adventures of the Galaxy Rangers
- Sundancer I and II, solar-powered cars built for The Solar Car Challenge
- AMC Sundancer, a vehicle conversion based on the two-wheel drive AMC Concord and four-wheel drive AMC Eagle
- MS Sundancer, a previous name of the ship MS Svea Corona
- Verilite Sundancer, an early name for the Verilite Sunbird
- Williams-Cangie WC-1 Sundancer, an American racing biplane design

== See also ==
- Sundance (disambiguation)
