= Sundance =

A Sun Dance is a Native American ceremony.

Sun dance or Sundance may also refer to:

== Places ==
Canada

- Sundance, Calgary, Alberta, a neighbourhood
- Sundance, Manitoba, a ghost town
- Sundance Peak, a mountain in Alberta

United States

- Sundance, New Mexico, a census-designated place
- Sundance, Wyoming, the county seat and largest community in Crook County
- Sundance Resort, a ski resort in Utah

== People ==
- Sundance (activist), American Indian civil rights activist and director of the Cleveland branch of the American Indian Movement
- Sundance (rapper) (born 1972), American rapper and radio personality
- Sundance, a Secret Service code name shared by Ethel Kennedy and Al Gore
- Sundance Bilson-Thompson, Australian physicist
- Sundance Head (born 1979), American country singer and season 6 American Idol contestant, and winner of season 11 of The Voice
- Sundance Kid (1867–1908), nickname of Harry Longabaugh
- Sundance Wicks (born 1980), American collegiate basketball coach

== Art, entertainment, and media ==
=== Films ===
- Butch Cassidy and the Sundance Kid (1969), an American Western film
- Sundance and the Kid (1969), a spaghetti Western film

=== Music ===
- "Sun Dance" (song), by Tomahawk
- Sun Dance (album), by Aimer
- Sundance (album), by Chick Corea
- The Sundance Kids, an Australian pop rock band

=== Sundance Group ===
- Sundance Group, an umbrella corporation run by Robert Redford with subsidiaries:
  - Sundance Film Festival, held annually in the Western United States
  - Sundance Institute, a center located in Utah's Wasatch Mountains that allows emerging filmmakers to cultivate their craft
  - Sundance TV (formerly known as Sundance Channel), an American digital cable and satellite television and film network owned by AMC Networks
  - Sundance Resort, a ski resort located outside of Provo, UT

=== Other arts, entertainment, and media ===
- Sundance (video game), released in 1979
- Sundance, a pony character in My Little Pony
- Butch Cassidy (TV series), a.k.a. Butch Cassidy and the Sundance Kids, a Hanna-Barbera animated series 1979

== Transport ==
- Sundance (charter vessel), on the River Thames
- Sundance, a call sign used by aircraft of the now-defunct WestAir Commuter Airlines
- Plymouth Sundance, a car made by Chrysler Corporation from 1987 to 1994
- Sun Dance 36, a French sailboat design

== Other uses ==
- Gaillardia pulchella, North American flowering plant
- Sundance Formation: a formation of rocks from North America's Jurassic period
- Sundance Sea: an ancient arm of the Arctic Ocean that extended through western North America
- Sundance Resources, an Australian mining company

== See also ==
- Sundancer (disambiguation)
