= AMC Concord =

Compact cars produced by American Motors Corporation

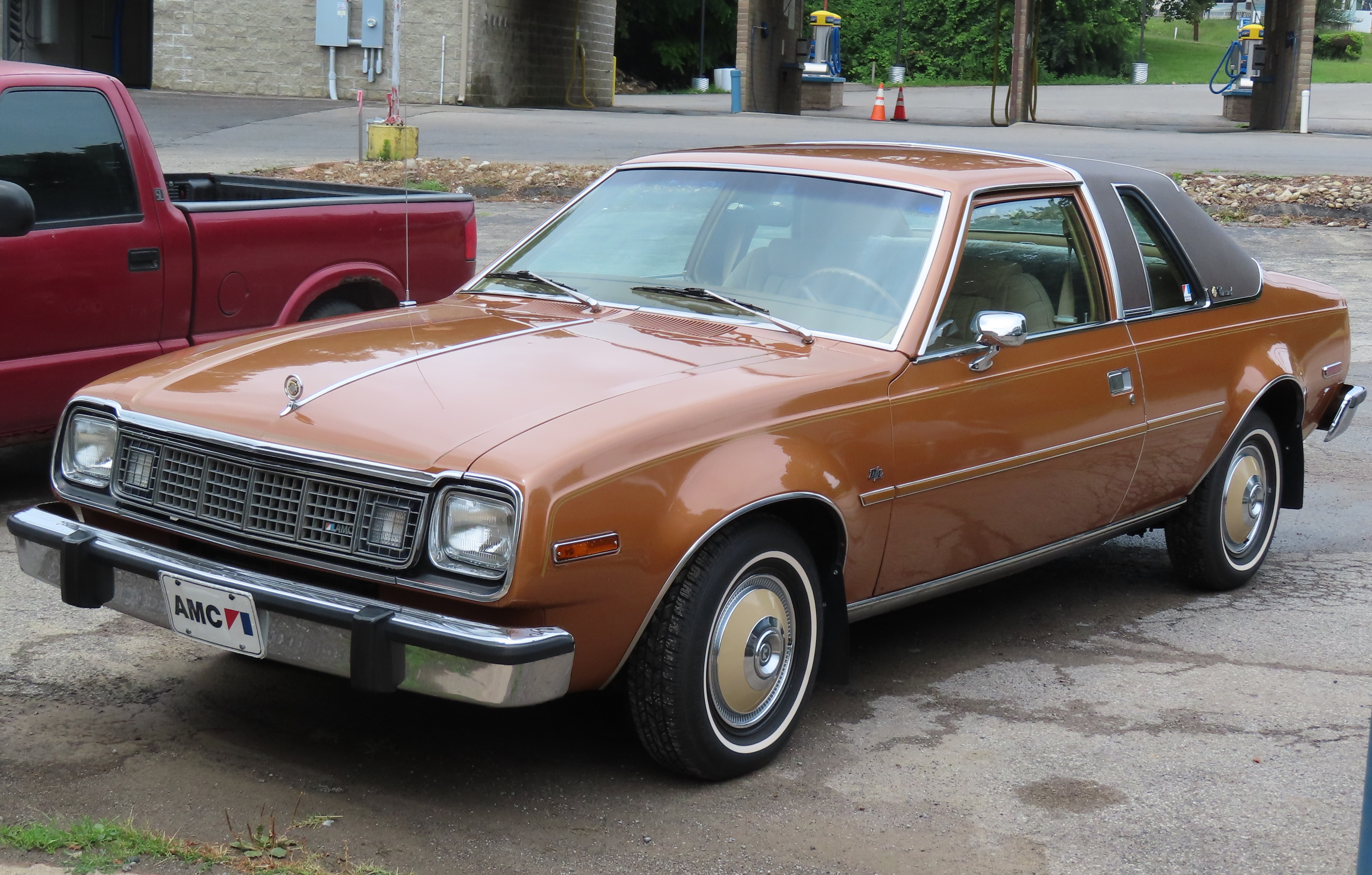
- 1978 AMC Concord D/L 2-door sedan

Overview
- Manufacturer: American Motors Corporation
- Also called: VAM American (Mexico); VAM Lerma (Mexico)
- Production: 1977–1983
- Model years: 1978–1983
- Assembly: United States: Kenosha, Wisconsin (Kenosha Assembly); Canada: Brampton, Ontario (Brampton Assembly); Mexico: Mexico City (VAM)
- Designer: Dick Teague

Body and chassis
- Class: Compact
- Body style: 4-door sedan; 2-door coupe; 2-door hatchback; 4-door station wagon; 4-door hatchback (Mexico); 2-door convertible
- Layout: FR layout
- Platform: AMC's "junior cars"
- Related: AMC Hornet; AMC Eagle; AMC Gremlin; AMC Spirit

Powertrain
- Engine: 122 cu in (2.0 L) Audi/VW EA831 I4; 151 cu in (2.5 L) GM Iron Duke I4; 232 cu in (3.8 L) I6; 258 cu in (4.2 L) I6; 282 cu in (4.6 L) I6 (Mexico); 304 cu in (5.0 L) V8; DC series traction (Solargen)
- Transmission: 3-speed TorqueFlite automatic; 3-speed manual; 4-speed manual; 5-speed manual

Dimensions
- Wheelbase: 108 in (2,743 mm)
- Length: 183.6 in (4,663 mm)
- Width: 71 in (1,803 mm)
- Height: 51.7 in (1,313 mm)
- Curb weight: 2,851 lb (1,293 kg) (base)

Chronology
- Predecessor: AMC Hornet
- Successor: Eagle Medallion

The AMC Concord is a compact car manufactured and marketed by the American Motors Corporation for model years 1978 through 1983. The Concord was essentially a revision of the AMC Hornet that was discontinued after 1977, but better equipped, quieter, and smoother-riding than the series it replaced. It was offered in four-door sedan, two-door coupe (through 1982), three-door hatchback (through 1979), and four-door station wagon with a rear liftgate. The Concord was AMC's volume seller from the time it appeared until the introduction of the Renault Alliance.

The car was available as a sports-oriented two-door hatchback AMX model without any "Concord" badges or identification for the 1978 model year, as well as the Concord Sundancer convertible during 1981 and 1982, an authorized conversion sold through AMC dealers.

Vehiculos Automotores Mexicanos (VAM) assembled and marketed modified Concord versions in Mexico as the VAM American, including a unique VAM Lerma model.

A battery electric (BEV) conversion of the Concord station wagon was sold independently from AMC by Solargen during 1979 and 1980.

== Origin and development ==
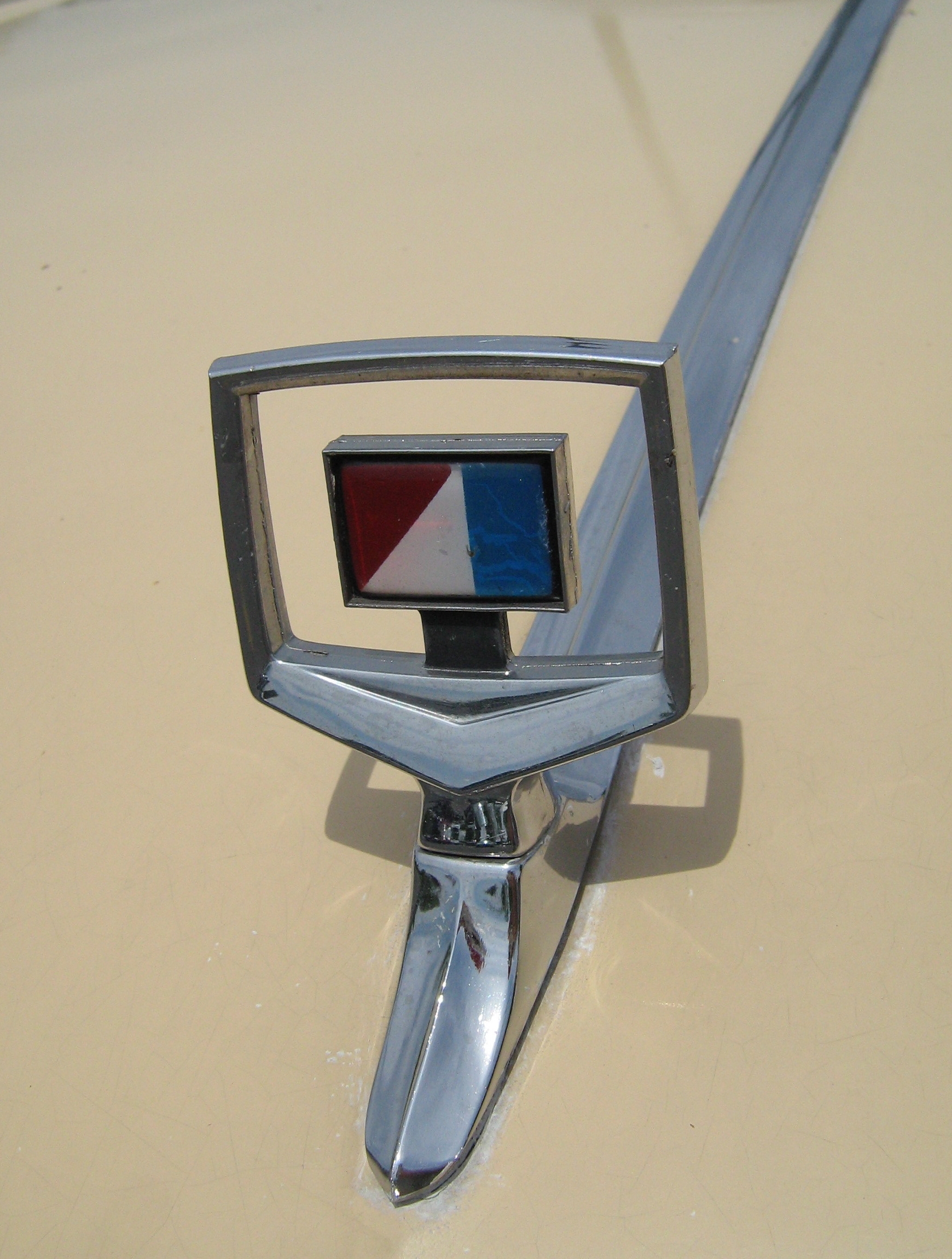
AMC Concord hood ornament

American Motors did not have the financial resources required to develop an entirely new car to replace its successful, but aging, Hornet. The competition was expected from the new Ford Fox platform (also introduced for the 1978 model year as the Fairmont and Zephyr). The rear-wheel drive GM A platform (RWD) intermediates, such as the Chevrolet Malibu, were to be downsized to the same 108-inch (2,743 mm) wheelbase as the Hornet for the 1978 model year as well, following the previous shrinking of full-size GM models. Therefore, the smallest domestic American automaker needed something fresh to continue competing in a class that had long been their core market segment. The 1978 Concord offered slightly revised styling, a higher level of appointments and features as well as a greater emphasis on workmanship and quality that was prompted by the growing success of cars imported from Japan. The transformation of the old Hornet into the new 1978 Concord included positioning the new model as an upscale luxury compact with a competitive starting price in the mid-US$4,000 range (adjusted only for inflation equivalent to US$19,745 in 2025 dollars).

The U.S. automobile industry has had a place "for a small company deft enough to exploit special market segments left untended by the giants" and under the leadership of "Gerald C. Meyers, AMC transformed the austere old Hornet into the more handsome Concord." Dick Teague, AMC's top car designer, utilized the facelifted 1977 Gremlin's front fenders with a new hood over a chrome six-section egg-crate grille incorporating white rectangular parking lights, as well as new rectangular headlights, bumpers, fiberglass rear fender end caps, rectangular tri-color taillights, and a stand-up hood ornament with a new Concord emblem. On cars with the optional D/L package, the roof featured an outlined quarter-vinyl cover in matching or contrasting colors.

The new model featured increased sound insulation and suspension upgrades to isolate the interior from vibration and noise. The new compact car's luxury ride - "aiming at a virtually noiseless boulevard ride" was engineered by isolating the front suspension and rear axle from the structure of the car. All Concord models included special insulation in the dashboard and front floor, as well as sound-deadening coatings to all areas where plastic components joined. Top models also came with molded fiberglass acoustical headlining and sound absorption pads behind all interior panels.

The Concord also came with numerous standard comfort and upscale features, gaining an inch (25.4 mm) of rear-seat headroom, as well as two additional inches (50.8 mm) of rear passenger legroom. An advantage of using the aging and heavy Hornet design was its body stiffness and safety performance. Crash tests conducted by the National Highway Traffic Safety Administration (NHTSA) showed the probability of injury in a struck vehicle to range from a low of nine percent for the four-door AMC Concord to a high of 97 percent for the two-door Nissan Sentra.

American Motors was increasingly turning to the rapidly growing four-wheel-drive market. Nevertheless, most of the press coverage for the 1978 model year "was focused on AMC's new Concord luxury compact car, which was a sign that even then reporters still considered automobiles more important than Jeeps." The new Concord was popular with consumers by outselling all the other AMC car lines combined during its 1978 inaugural year.

== Annual changes ==
=== 1978 ===
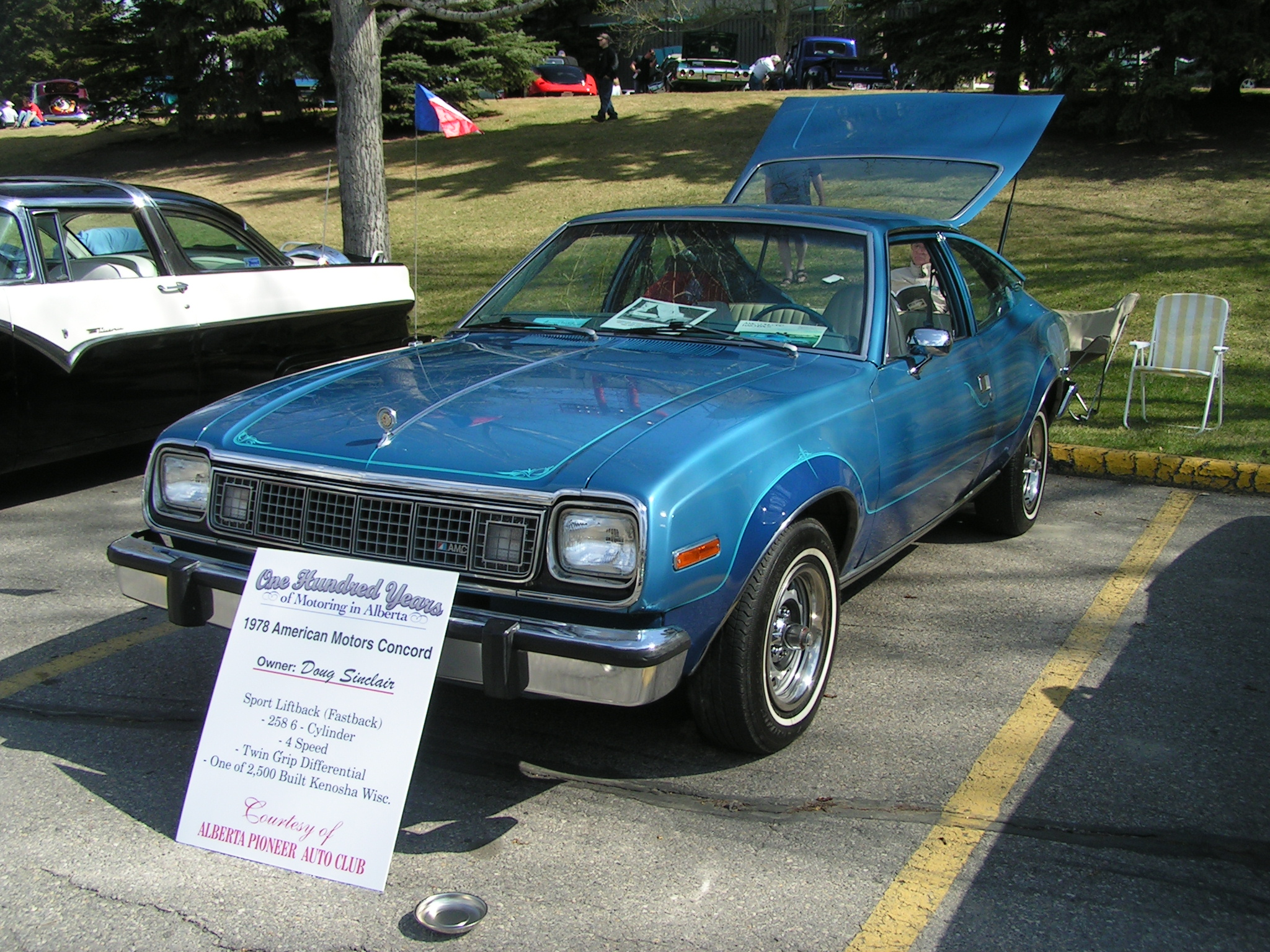
1978 AMC Concord DL Sport liftback

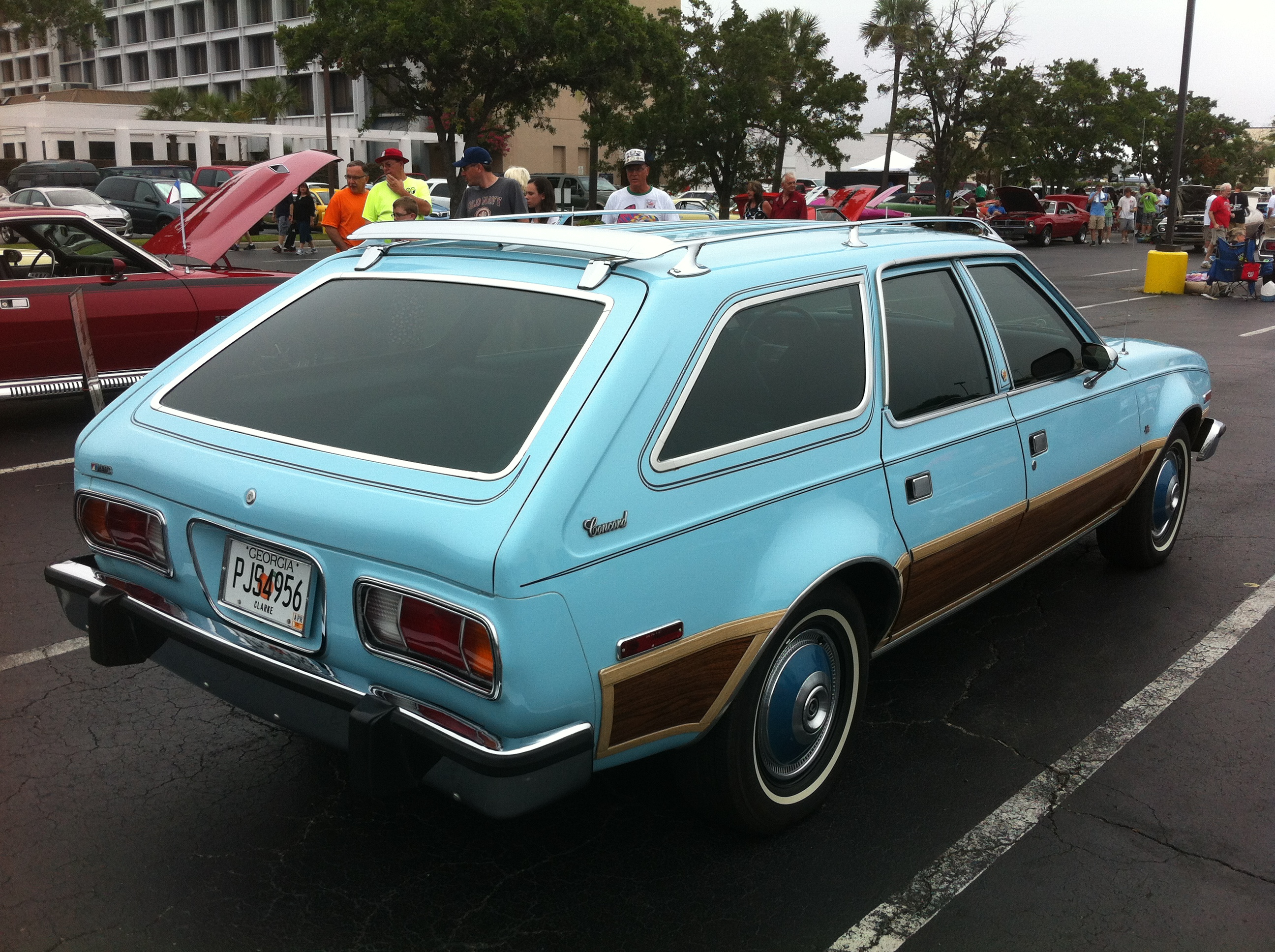
1978 AMC Concord DL station wagon

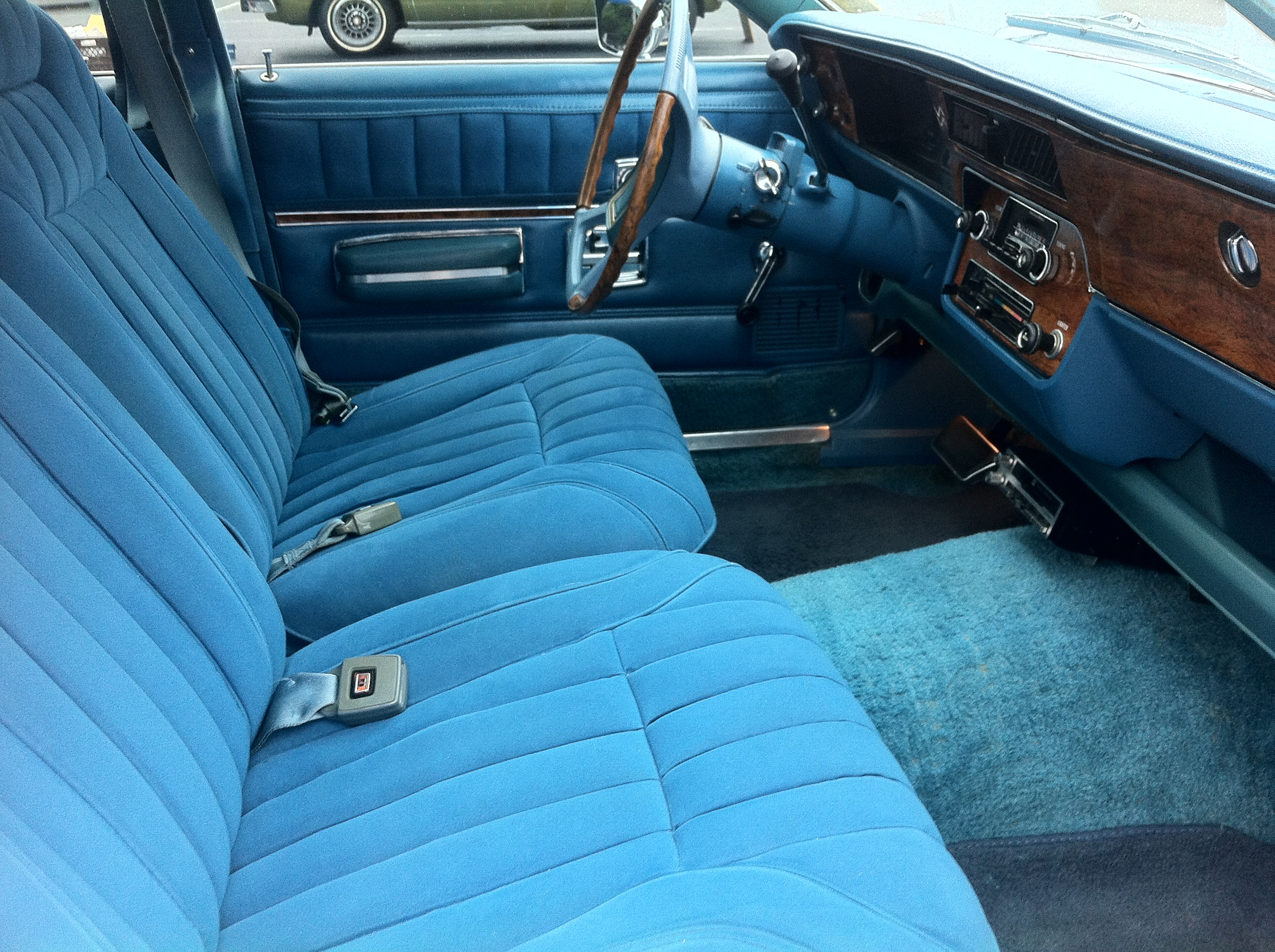
1978 velveteen cloth upholstery and woodgrain accents

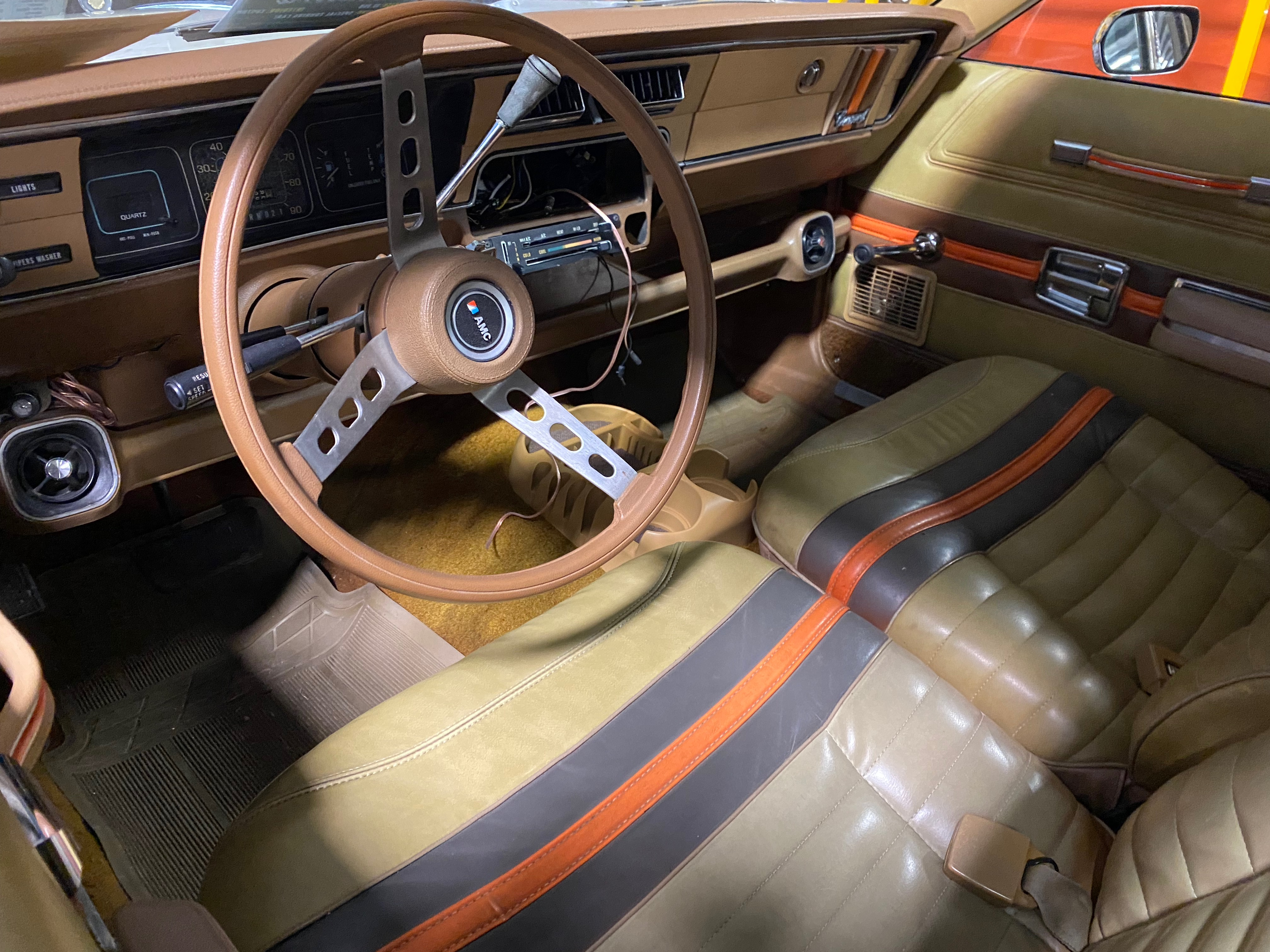
1978 Touring Wagon interior

In its initial model year, the Concord models were available in base and the top-line D/L in four body styles. The marketing focused on the D/L version with AMC's sales brochure dedicated exclusively to describing the elegant appointments and comfort features with no extra charge for all the luxury.

The base model sedan Concords retained the previous Hornet's two-door and four-door sedan rooflines. It incorporated the new front and rear-end styling, as well as numerous mechanical improvements. AMC targeted this model for fleet buyers.

The D/L models featured many of the luxury cues that were popular on cars in the 1970s. These included a "landau" vinyl roof with opera windows (coupe only), color-keyed wheel covers, reclining seats covered in velveteen cloth, and woodgrain instrument panel overlays. The D/L wagon also featured exterior simulated woodgrain trim and reclining seats in a leather-like perforated vinyl.

A "Touring Wagon" package was available exclusively on D/L wagons. It included a unique beige interior with orange and brown accents on the seat upholstery, door panels, dash trim, and exterior bodyside molding. The carpeting was extra thick (24 oz.), and the steering wheel was wrapped in beige leather. The D/L wagon's exterior wood trim was unavailable with this package. The exterior colors of the Touring Wagon were limited to Alpine White, Sand Tan, Golden Ginger, and Mocha Brown. The full-wheel covers had matching painted trim.

A "Sport" package was available on all models when equipped with the optional 258 cu in (4.2 L) I6 or the 304 cu in (5.0 L) V8 engine. This package included slot-style road wheels, wide rocker panel moldings, and bodyside tape stripes on the lower half of the vehicle that went up around the wheel fender flares. The interior featured brushed aluminum instrument panel overlays, custom door trim panels, and the extra quiet insulation package. Bucket seats in soft-feel vinyl were included, with individual reclining seats in vinyl or velveteen crush fabric optional in sedans and wagon models.

A unique AMX model was available only on the liftback body style and featured unique trim as well as performance enhancements. The AMX was featured as a separate model in AMC's full-line brochure. This version turned out to be a one-year-only as the AMX model was moved to the sub-compact Spirit platform for the 1979 model year.

The 232 cu in (3.8 L) AMC Straight-6 engine was standard, with the 258 cu in (4.2 L) six-cylinder and a 304 cu in (5.0 L) V8 being optional on the D/L models. Transmission options included a three-speed manual, a three-speed automatic, or a floor-shifted manual four-speed. A Concord with the V8 engine was tested by Car and Driver magazine and recorded acceleration from 0 to 60 mph (0 to 97 km/h) in 10.4 seconds and had a top speed of 100 miles per hour (160 km/h).

American Motors also introduced an optional Volkswagen/Audi-designed 2.0 L (122 cu in) I4 engine that was also available in the sub-compact Gremlin. The engine was the same as used in the Porsche 924, although the Porsche version was fitted with Bosch fuel injection instead of the carburetors on the AMC models. This engine provided improved economy, but was not as powerful as the standard six-cylinder engine. Because of the expense of acquiring the rights to the new 2.0 L engine, AMC did not offer this I4 as standard equipment.

American Motors marketed the Concord as a more economical alternative to larger luxury cars. At the time of Concord's introduction, the advertising tagline touted the car as "The luxury America wants, the size America needs." The most popular body style was the two-door coupe, accounting for almost half of total Concord production in 1978. The Concord outsold AMC's other passenger models (Pacer, Matador, and Gremlin) combined in its first year in the marketplace.

A Popular Science comparison of four new compact sedans concluded that AMC's aim "hit the mark" at car buyers switching to smaller cars. The AMC Concord earned "top honors for trim level" with its luxury, reclining seats covered in velvet-like fabric "front seats that would do a Cadillac proud", as well as its "in-line six is similar to a V8 in a number of respects, including smoothness, power, and noise levels." High-quality materials and attractive dash design "would have you thinking this was an expensive car were it for one thing: poor quality control." Compared to the Ford Fairmont, Plymouth Volaré, and Pontiac Phoenix, the 1978 compact cars offer more variety and "especially the Concord, are more refined than ever and make lots of sense as family cars."

Owners in a nationwide survey conducted by Popular Mechanics magazine responded that they liked their AMC Concords based on their combined 1,127,000 miles (1,813,731 km) of driving. Drivers reported "few and rather minor gripes". When asked to name their complaints, 30% of AMC Concord owners wrote none, thus beating the record of all the 17 automobiles surveyed by the magazine in 1977 by a wide margin - including the Honda Accord (with only an 18.9% "no complaints" rate).

=== 1979 ===
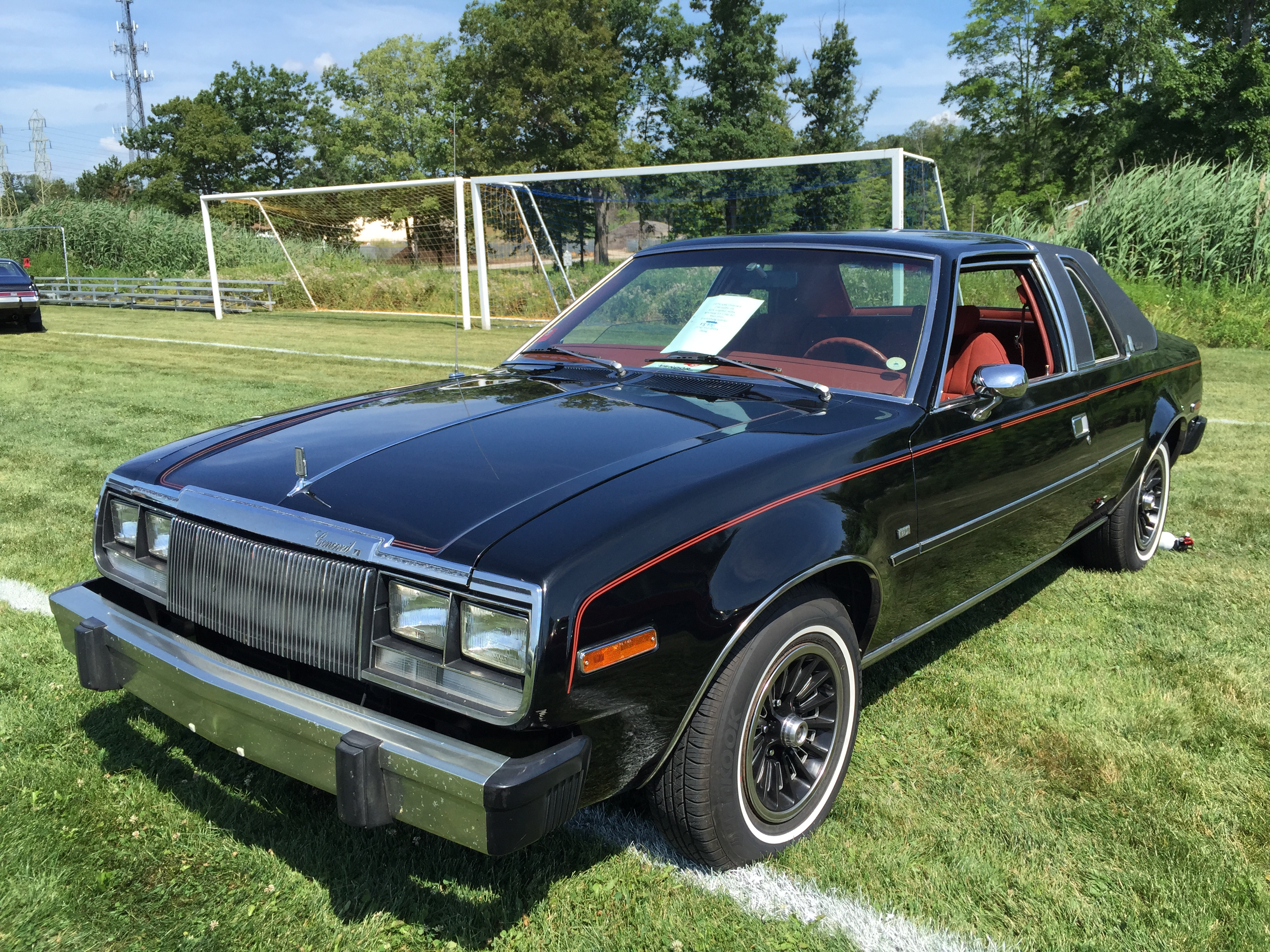
1979 AMC Concord D/L 2-door sedan

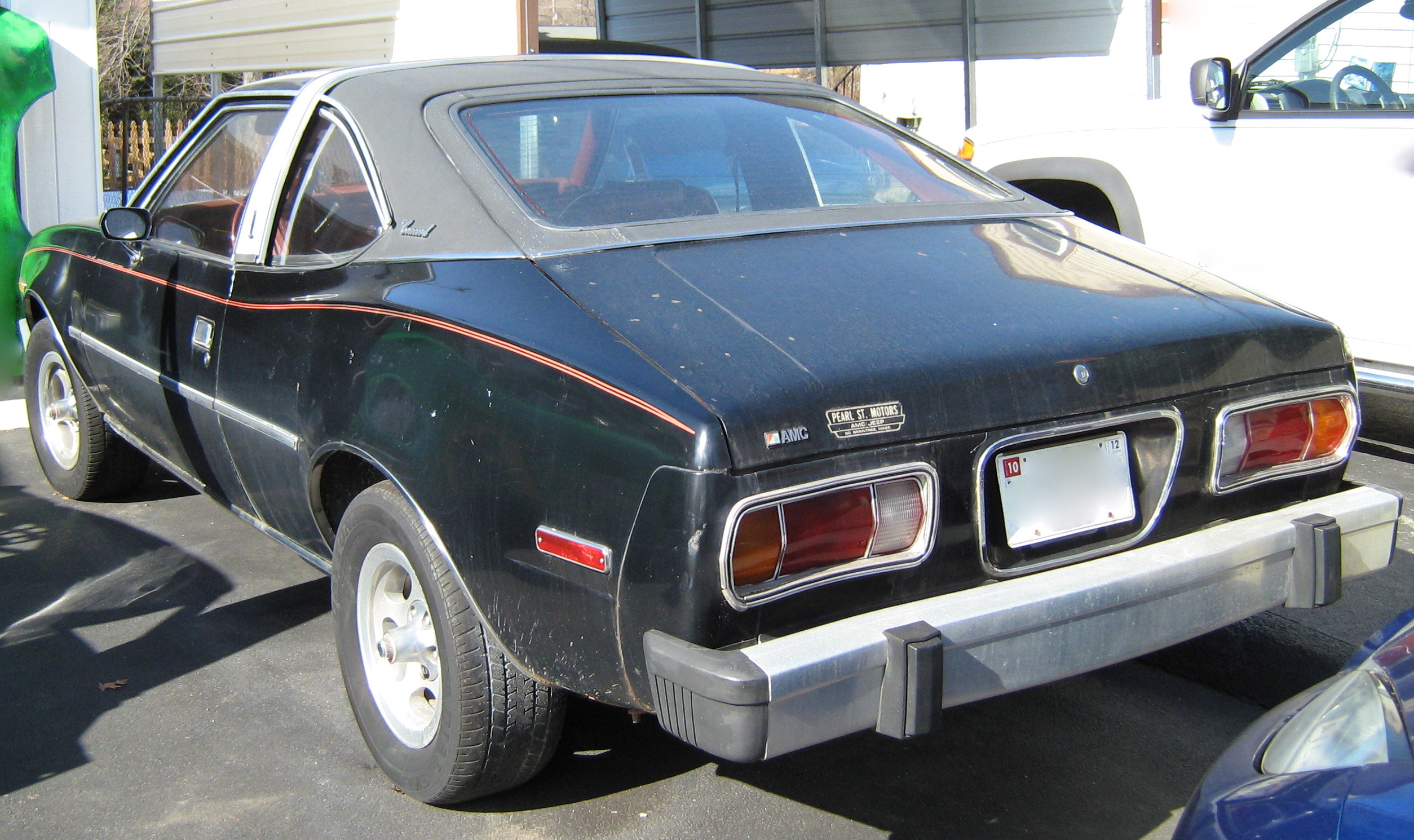
1979 AMC Concord D/L hatchback

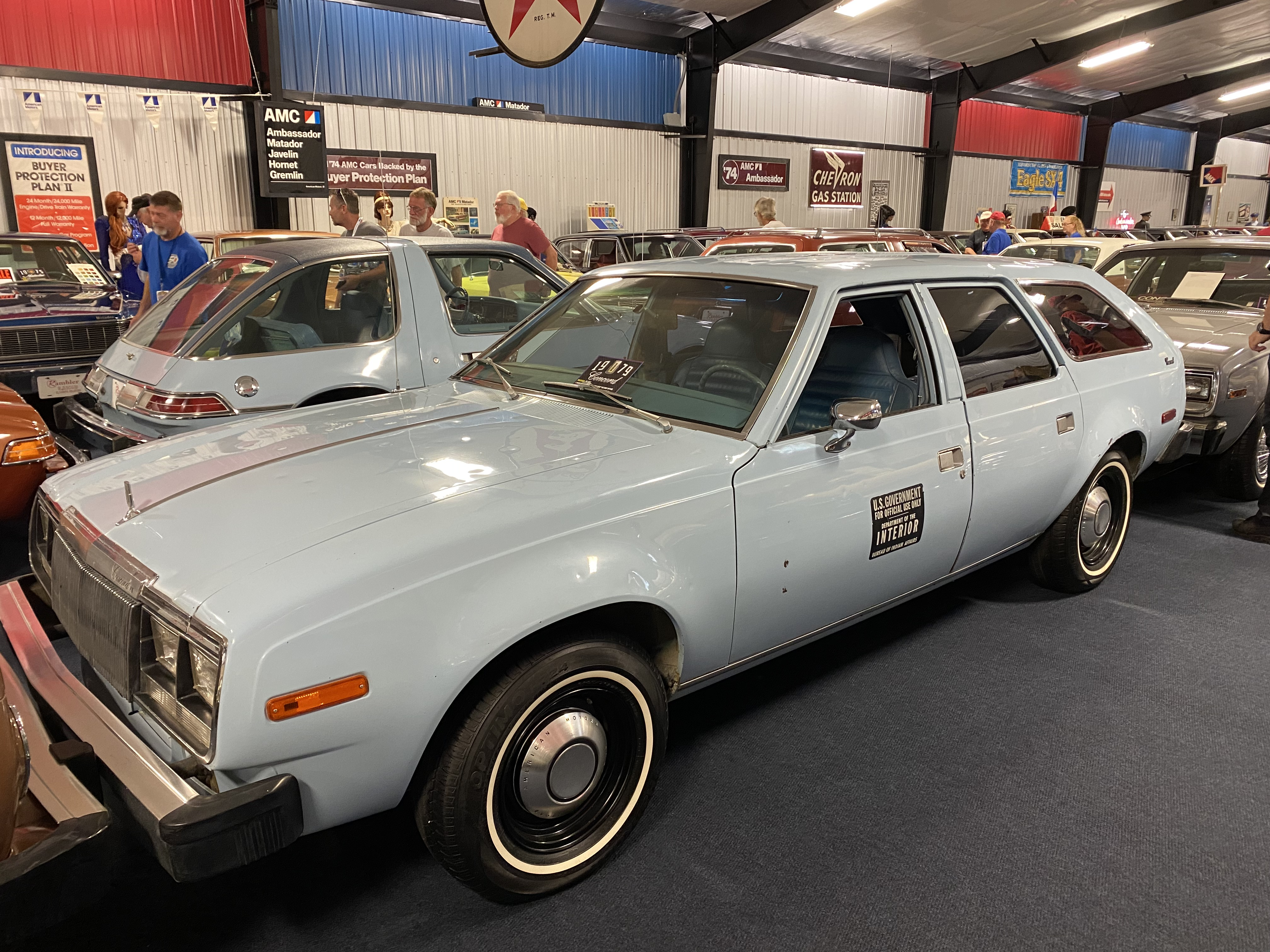
1979 AMC Concord wagon used by the US Department of Interior

The 1979 model year saw moderate upgrades to the Concord. Front-end styling changed appreciably with a "waterfall" grille with a delicate chrome vertical bar treatment, quad rectangular headlights atop slim, wide clear parking and signal lights, and lighter aluminum bumpers were new for 1979. The D/L sedan was given a new vinyl roof design which extended only over the rear passenger compartment. It was complemented by chrome trim that overlaid the B-pillar and wrapped over the vinyl roof at its leading edge. A thin trim piece at the roof's edge simulated a convertible's fold-down hinge point. The D/L package, now the middle trim level, was extended to the hatchback, which was given a brushed aluminum Targa-like roof band and a half-vinyl roof to differentiate it from the base model hatchback.

The 1979 model year also introduced the "Limited" model, available in the coupe, sedan, and station wagon models. It included leather upholstery, thick carpeting, full courtesy lighting, body-colored wheel covers, and a standard AM radio. The Concord Limited was well equipped for a compact car at the time.

Special-order versions of Concords were built to contracts and fleet customers that had minimal trim and options as well as rear-seat delete and rear doors with non-opening windows and no interior door handles.

The Sport package was dropped for 1979, as was the AMX version that became available in the new AMC Spirit liftback body. The three-speed manual transmission was a "downgrade" option for Concord in 1979. The 304 cu in (5.0 L) V8 engine was available, but not popular. The V8 with automatic transmission delivered 15 mpg_{‑US} (16 L/100 km; 18 mpg_{‑imp}) in the city and 21 mpg_{‑US} (11 L/100 km; 25 mpg_{‑imp}) on the highway, while the standard I6 was rated 18 mpg_{‑US} (13 L/100 km; 22 mpg_{‑imp}) in the city and 26 mpg_{‑US} (9.0 L/100 km; 31 mpg_{‑imp}) or better on the highway (depending on driving habits and transmission).

On 1 May 1979, AMC celebrated the 25th anniversary of the Nash-Hudson merger and released a limited number of specially appointed "Silver Anniversary" AMC Concords to commemorate the event. The limited production models received a two-tone silver metallic finish, silver vinyl roof, wire wheel covers, commemorative badges, and the interior upholstered in black or russet "Caberfae" corduroy.

A Popular Science road test of three traditional compact cars (AMC Concord, Ford Fairmont, and Plymouth Volaré) facing the challenge of GM's new front-wheel drive "X cars" (Chevrolet Citation and Oldsmobile Omega) summarized that AMC was committed to serve market segments not served by the other domestic automakers, and concluded that "Concord is the best-looking inside, and offers the plush feel of a big, expensive sedan."

The Concord line sales totaled more than 100,000 units during a year when the imported Japanese were gaining market share and new competing domestic models were changing to front-wheel drive.

=== 1980 ===
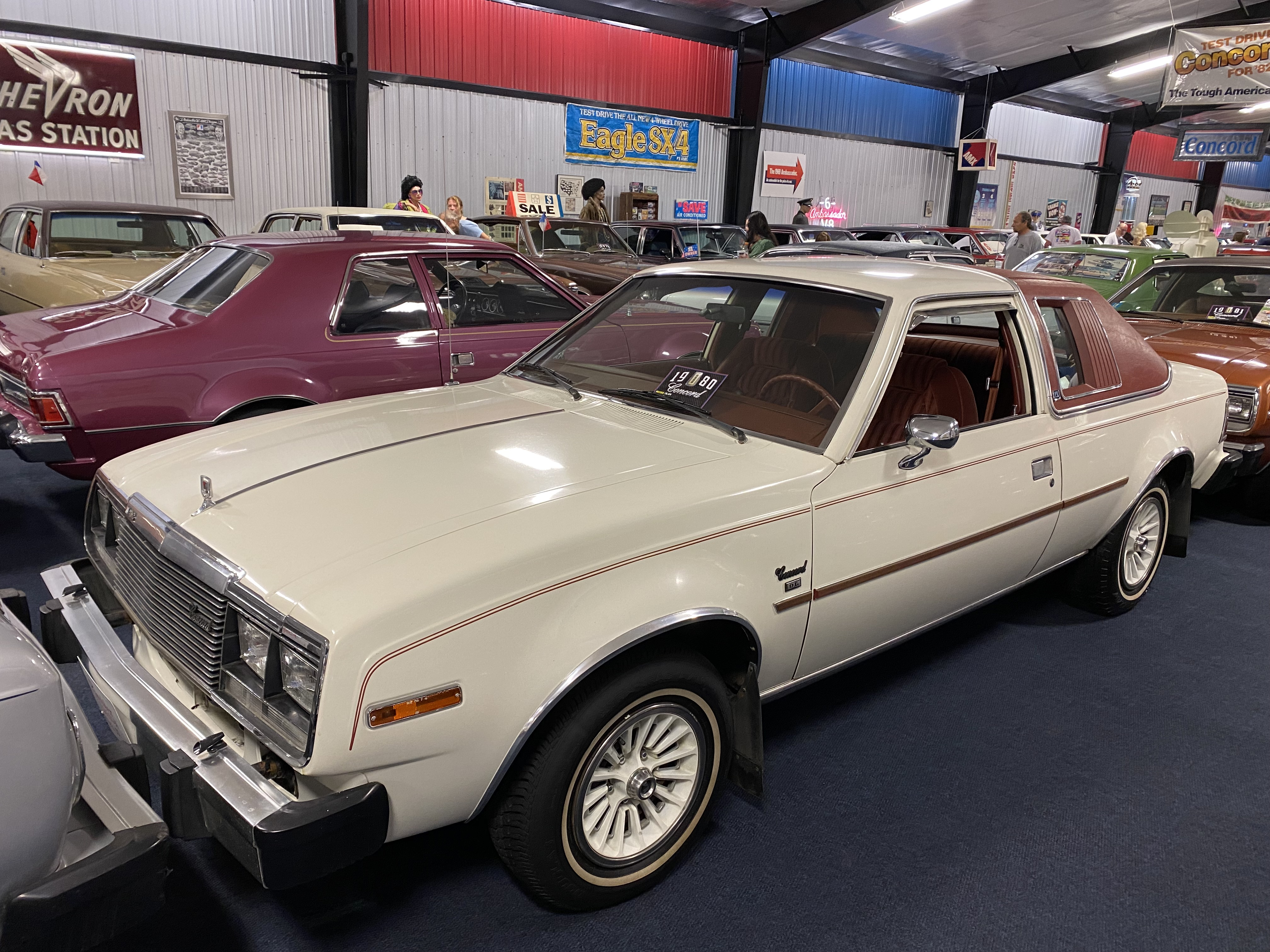
1980 AMC Concord DL coupe

The 1980 model year Concord featured a smoother appearance. The sedan versions of the D/L and Limited now included full vinyl roofs with nearly triangular opera windows embedded in the C-pillars; the coupe versions received squared-off opera windows and revised chrome opera window trim with vertical strakes occupying the space between the window itself and the outer piece of trim. Limited wagons received blackout paint and chrome trim surrounding their rear quarter windows. Base sedans and coupes retained the same rooflines and treatment seen on Hornets since 1970. Taillights were modified and given a wraparound treatment. All Concords received a new horizontal bar grille, with the Concord name in script to the driver's side, and a new, squared-off hood ornament bearing the AMC tri-color logo. New convenience options such as power windows and seats were made available. The hatchback body style was discontinued for the 1980 model year.

The three-speed manual transmission was no longer available with the 1980 model year. General Motors' Iron Duke I4 engine replaced the rarely ordered VW/Audi four. Both the largest 304 cu in (5.0 L) V8 and the smallest 232 cu in (3.8 L) I6 engines were discontinued for 1980, leaving only the outsourced 151 cu in (2.5 L) I4 and AMC's durable 258 cu in (4.2 L) I6 engines as the available choices.

All AMCs were treated with Ziebart Factory Rust Protection for 1980. Changes included the use of aluminized trim screws, plastic inner fender liners, galvanized steel in every exterior body panel, and a deep-dip (up to the window line) bath in epoxy-based primer. AMC backed up the rust protection of the Concords with a new five-year "No Rust Thru" transferable warranty. This was in addition to the comprehensive "buyer protection plan", a twelve-month/12,000-mile (19,000 km) warranty with a loaner car and trip interruption protection that AMC introduced in 1972, covering everything on the car except the tires.

Although it was the oldest design and equipped with the biggest engine in a group of station wagons that Popular Science magazine road tested, the Concord recorded the best acceleration and fuel economy figures (compared to Chevrolet Malibu, Chrysler LeBaron, and Ford Fairmont). The test and driving report summarized that for many customers, the versatile six-cylinder automobiles like the AMC Concord wagon, were excellent substitutes for full-size cars.

=== 1981 ===
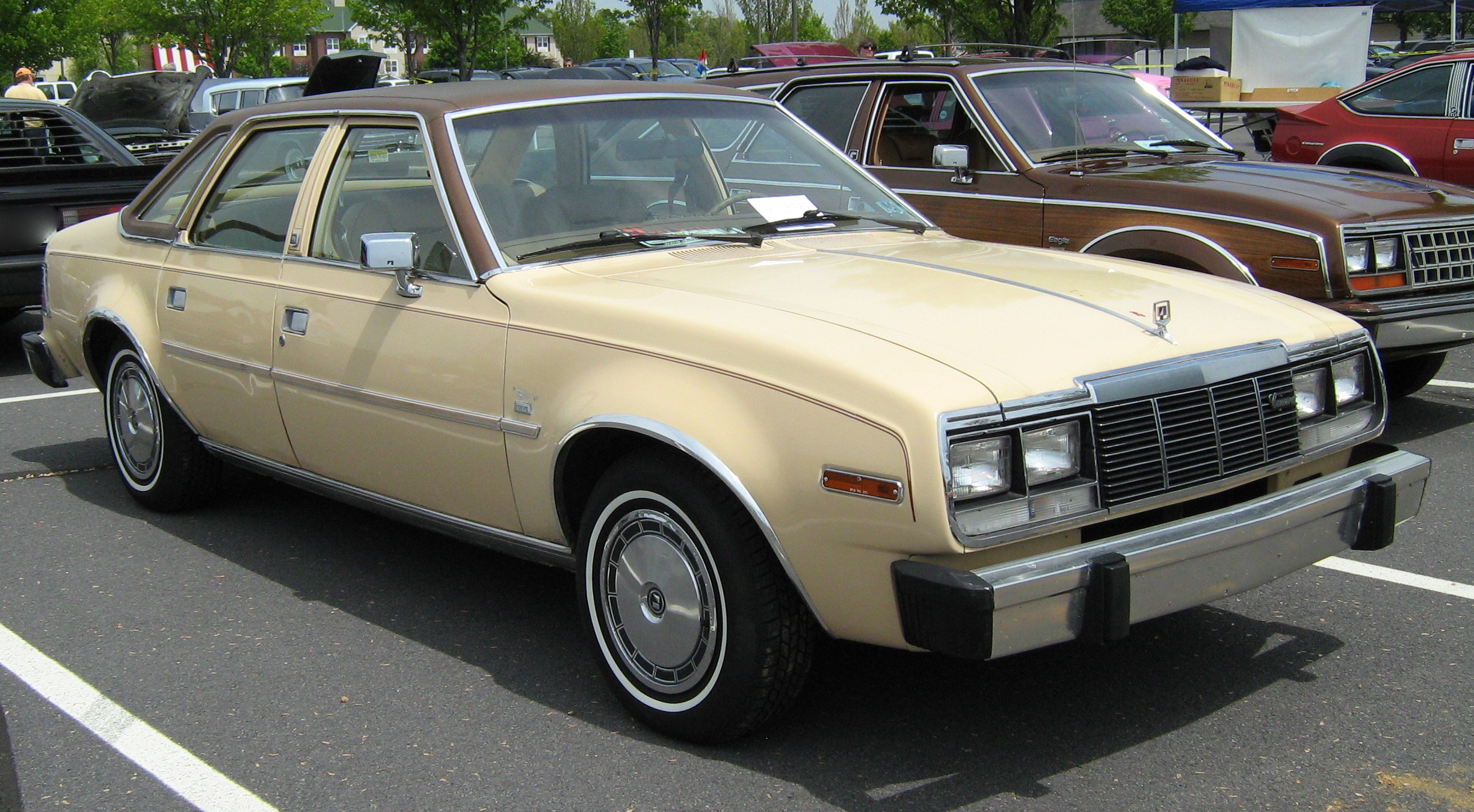
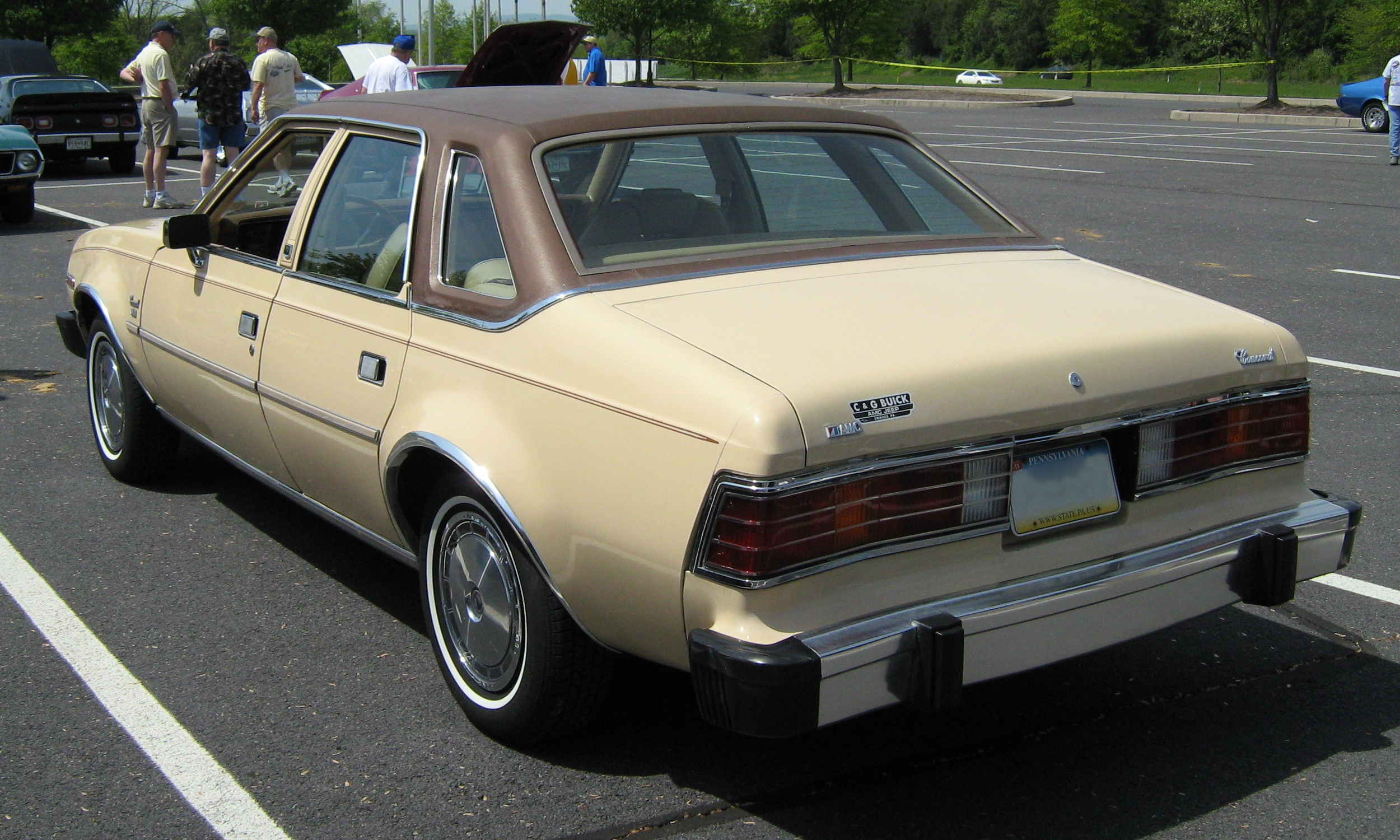
1981 AMC Concord DL 4-door sedan

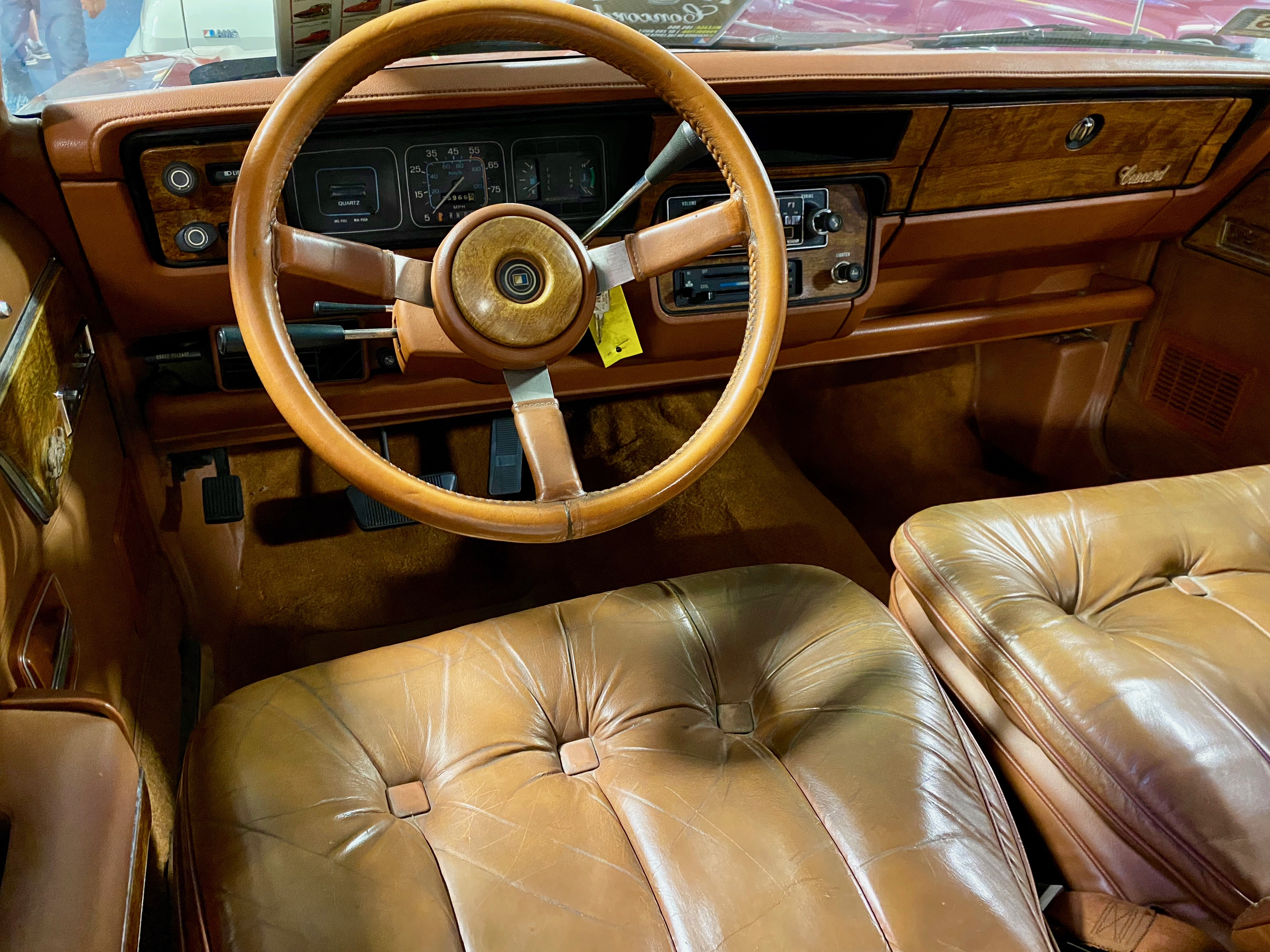
1981 AMC Concord Limited interior

Journalists described the 1981 Concord as "the most luxurious of all the U.S. compacts". A new grille treatment consisted of chrome horizontal bars spaced further apart than in 1980 and added three vertical bars, one in the center and two were outboard thus dividing the two halves into quarters. Noryl wheel covers embodying a pseudo-starfish pattern were new to the options list. The opera window on two-door sedans was slightly redesigned.

The most significant change for the 1981 Concord was the availability of a four-cylinder engine, the 151 cu in (2.5 L) Iron Duke engine supplied by General Motors. The new I4 engine achieved top fuel efficiency when combined with a four-speed manual, but did not really suit the car's character. This was the result "of those fuel-economy-obsessed years." Most popular was the carbureted I6 which was rated at 110 hp (82 kW; 112 PS). However, this engine had "enough torque available at low revs to pull a small house." Fuel economy figures for the 49 state versions in 1981 were:

- 23 mpg_{‑US} (10 L/100 km; 28 mpg_{‑imp}) city and 34 mpg_{‑US} (6.9 L/100 km; 41 mpg_{‑imp}) highway for the four-cylinder with four-speed manual
- 20 mpg_{‑US} (12 L/100 km; 24 mpg_{‑imp}) city and 26 mpg_{‑US} (9.0 L/100 km; 31 mpg_{‑imp}) for the four-cylinder with automatic
- 19 mpg_{‑US} (12 L/100 km; 23 mpg_{‑imp}) city and 28 mpg_{‑US} (8.4 L/100 km; 34 mpg_{‑imp}) for the six-cylinder with four-speed
- 19 mpg_{‑US} (12 L/100 km; 23 mpg_{‑imp}) city and 26 mpg_{‑US} (9.0 L/100 km; 31 mpg_{‑imp}) for the most popular six-cylinder with automatic combination

Popular Science magazine highly recommended AMC's I6 as a "well-proven power plant" compared to the newly standard four-cylinder engine. The Concord that was comparison road tested had the 258 cu in (4.2 L) engine, and the car achieved better acceleration compared to the considerably smaller-engined Dodge Aries, Chevrolet Citation, and Mercury Zephyr.

Three trim levels were offered: base, DL, and Limited in three body styles. There were four road wheel designs. The full "custom" wheel covers were standard on the Base model, full styled wheel covers (stainless steel) were standard on Concord DL, simulated wire wheel covers were standard on Limited models, and the 14×7 inch "Turbocast II" aluminum wheels were optional on all 1981 models. A total of 15 exterior paint colors were available: Olympic white, classic black, quick silver metallic, steel gray metallic, medium blue metallic, moonlight blue, autumn gold, Sherwood green metallic, cameo tan, copper brown metallic, medium brown metallic, dark brown metallic, Oriental red, vintage red metallic, and deep maroon metallic.

The AMC Concord offered interiors that looked expensive and were comfortable and finished to a level equal in appearance to expensive American luxury cars. Even without the top-line "Limited" upgrade, the Concord "was trimmed in first-class fashion". Interiors were available in "deluxe grain" vinyl in black, blue, beige, and nutmeg. Sculptured "Rochelle velour" fabric came in black, blue, wine, beige, and nutmeg. Leather was available only in nutmeg. Station wagons were available with simulated woodgrain lower body side trim.

American Motors had a "quicker erosion" problem compared to the other automakers. To help mitigate this, AMC increased its 1981 advertising budget by 15% to $51 million. It used TV as the major medium on behalf of its cars, Renaults, and Jeeps. All AMC cars were marketed as the "Tough Americans" in print and television advertisements, indicating the presence of fully galvanized steel bodies, aluminized exhausts, and the comprehensive Ziebart rust protection processes included from the factory. Revenue for AMC in 1981 increased, but unit sales of both cars and Jeeps decreased. Sales of Concords for 1981 in the U.S. market totaled 59,838. Overseas markets saw a sales increase for cars as well as Jeeps.

=== 1982 ===
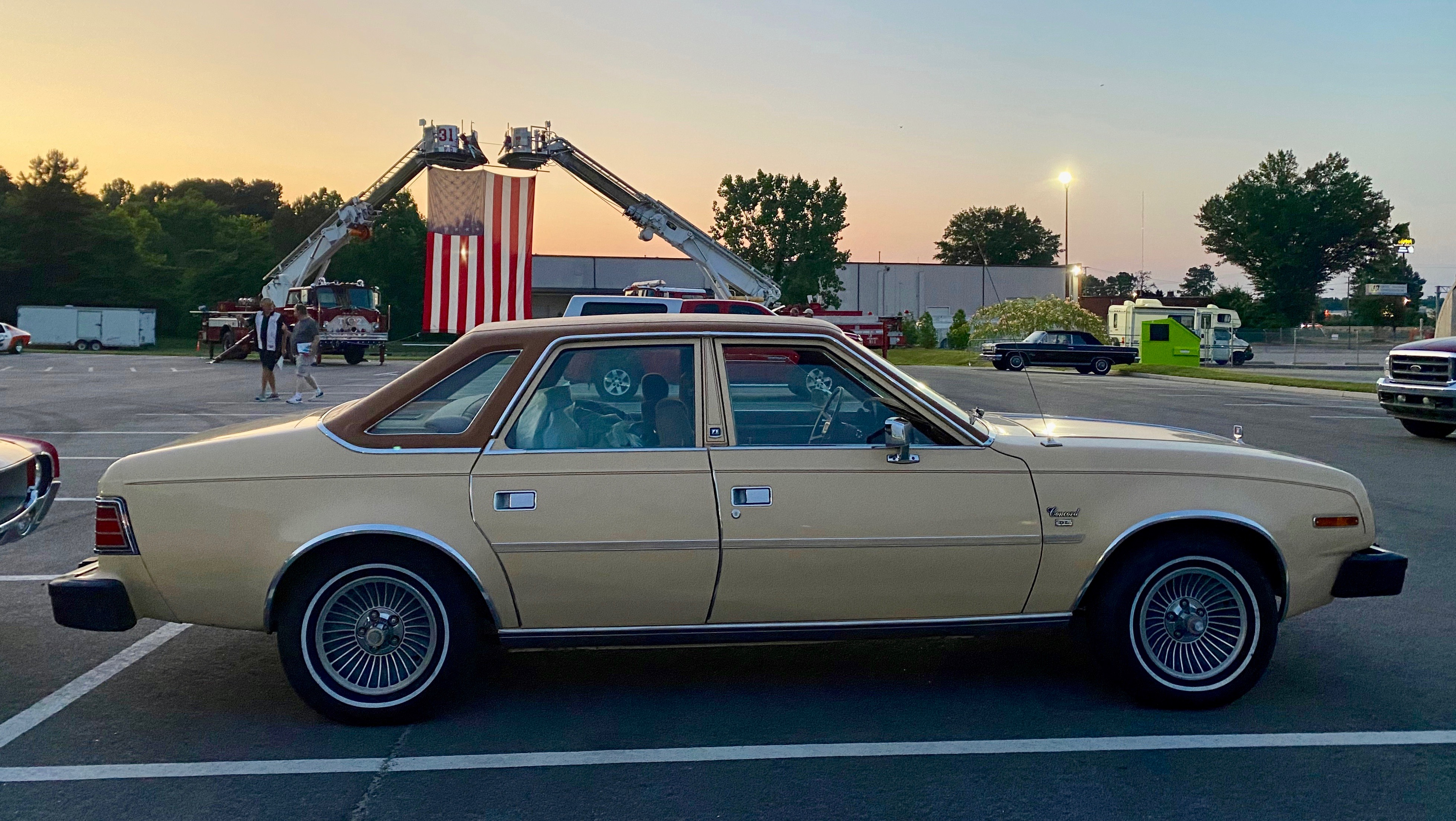
1982 AMC Concord DL sedan

Changes for the 1982 model year were minor. Popular Mechanics noted that it is difficult to distinguish the 1982 cars from their 1981 counterparts because, for the first time in history, AMC has not made appearance changes. The DL and Limited coupes saw the removal of the vertical strakes on their Landau vinyl roofs.

A new five-speed manual transmission made the options list, allowing a 151 cu in (2.5 L) Concord to achieve up to 37 mpg_{‑US} (6.4 L/100 km; 44 mpg_{‑imp}) on the highway, according to United States Environmental Protection Agency (EPA) estimates. The Chrysler-designed three-speed automatic transmission received wider ratios, and low-drag disc brakes were added as fuel economy measures. The 258 cu in (4.2 L) I6 engine now featured a serpentine belt system.

=== 1983 ===
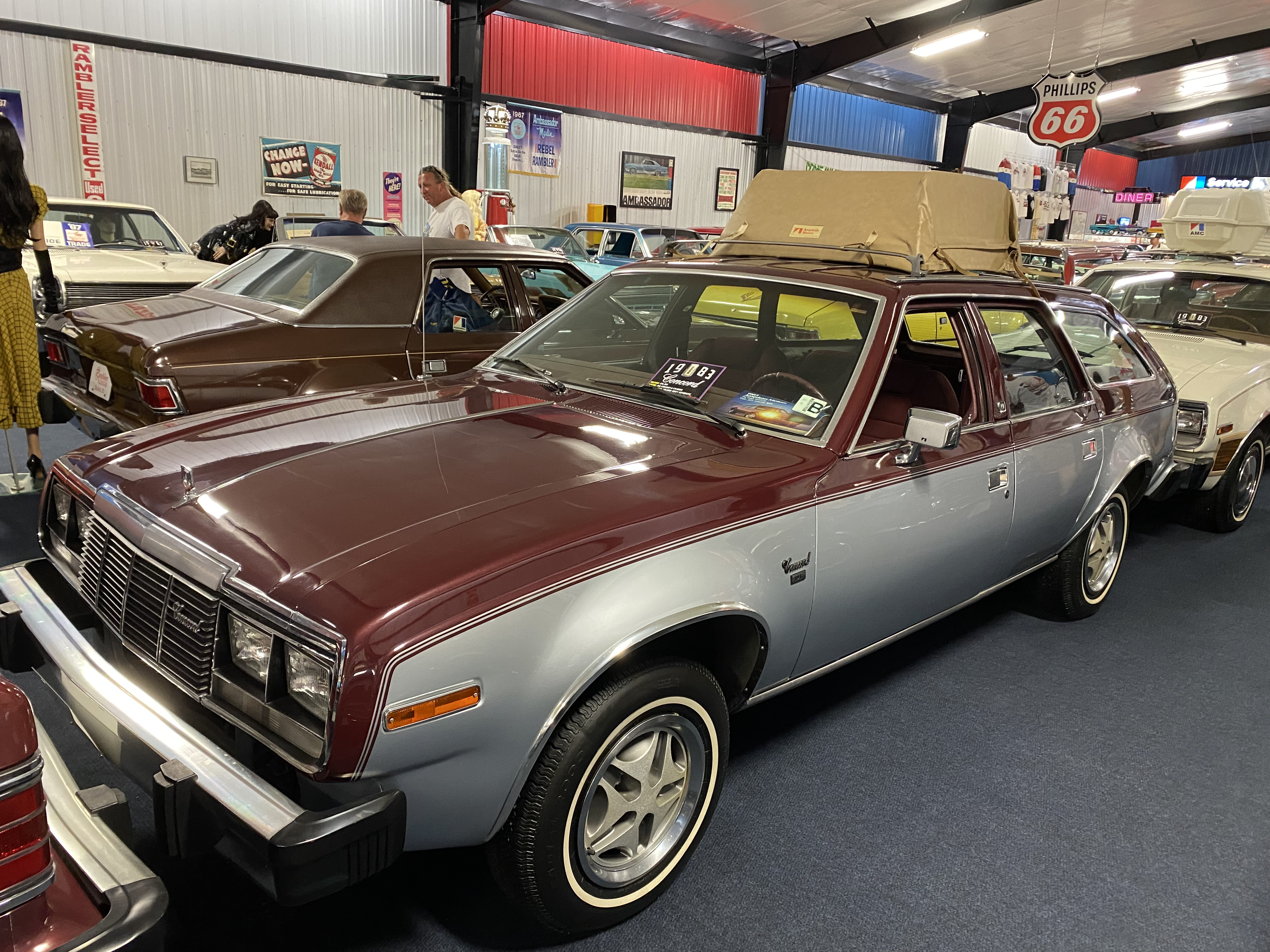
1983 AMC Concord DL station wagon

Consolidation of the Concord lineup continued for the 1983 model year. The slow-selling GM-sourced 151 cu in (2.5 L) I4 engine was no longer available. The two-door body style and the top-of-the-line Limited sedan model were dropped. The Concord range now included the base and DL four-door sedans as well as the base, DL, and Limited wagons. All 1983 Concords came with the 258 cu in (4.2 L) I6 engine, and the cars included more standard equipment for their final model year.

Sales slowed in the wake of the introduction of the Renault Alliance, which were more modern, space-efficient, fuel-efficient four-cylinder, front-wheel-drive cars compared to the rear-drive Concord with its aging platform. The imported Renault 18-based 18i sedan Sportwagon sold by AMC/Jeep/Renault dealers were also more efficient replacements.

The future for AMC's Concord series was sealed for the 1980s as front-drive models replaced rear-drive cars. Concord production ceased at the end of the 1983 model year.

Production Figures:

AMC Concord Production Figures
	Hatchback	Coupe	Sedan	Wagon	Yearly Total
1978	2,572	50,482	42,126	23,573	118,753
1979	2,331	40,110	40,134	20,278	102,853
1980	-	27,845	35,198	17,413	80,456
1981	-	15,496	24,403	15,198	55,097
1982	-	6,132	25,572	12,106	43,810
1983	-	-	4,433	867	5,300
Total	4,903	140,065	171,866	89,435	406,269

== AMX ==
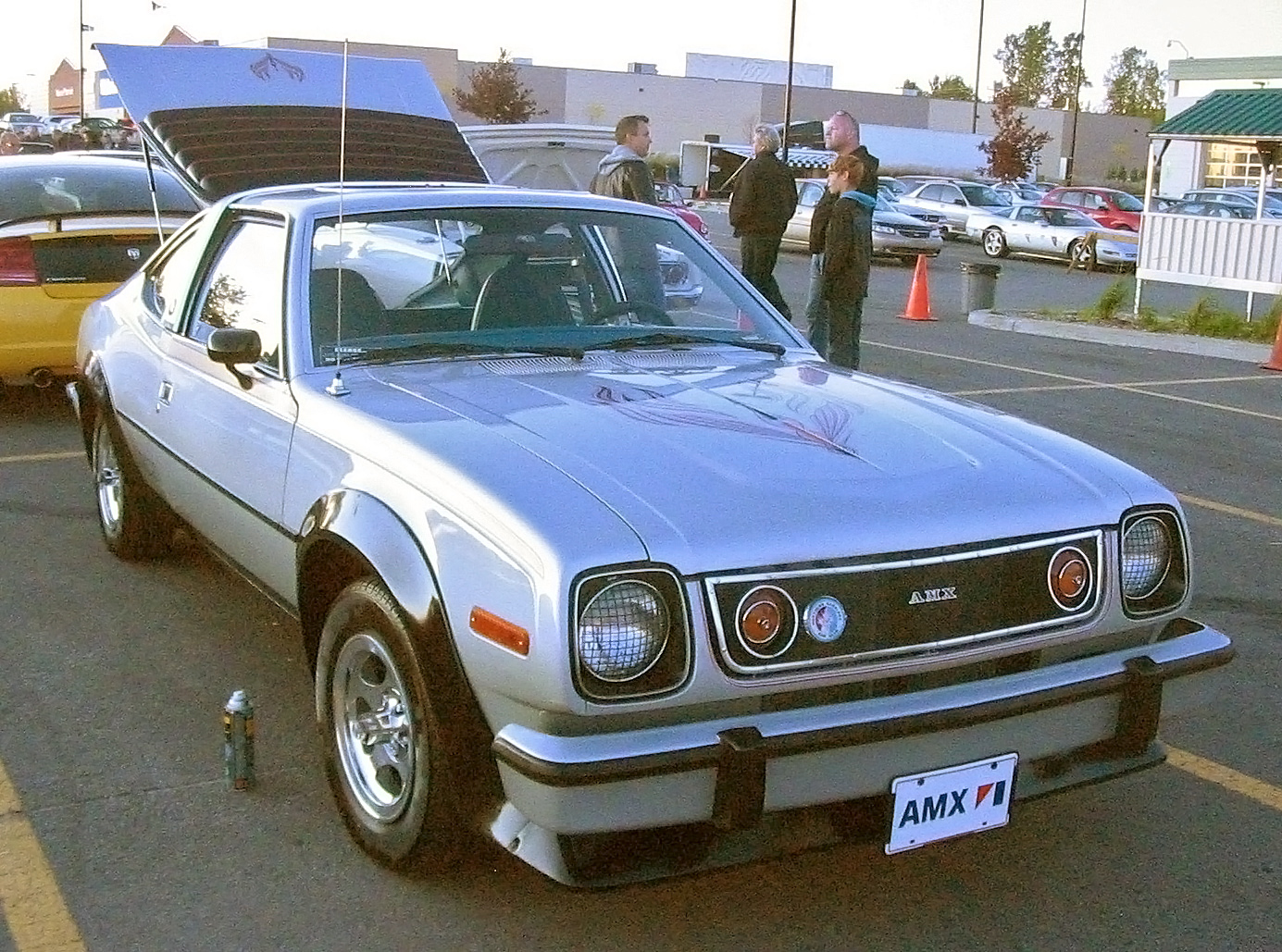
1978 AMC AMX in silver

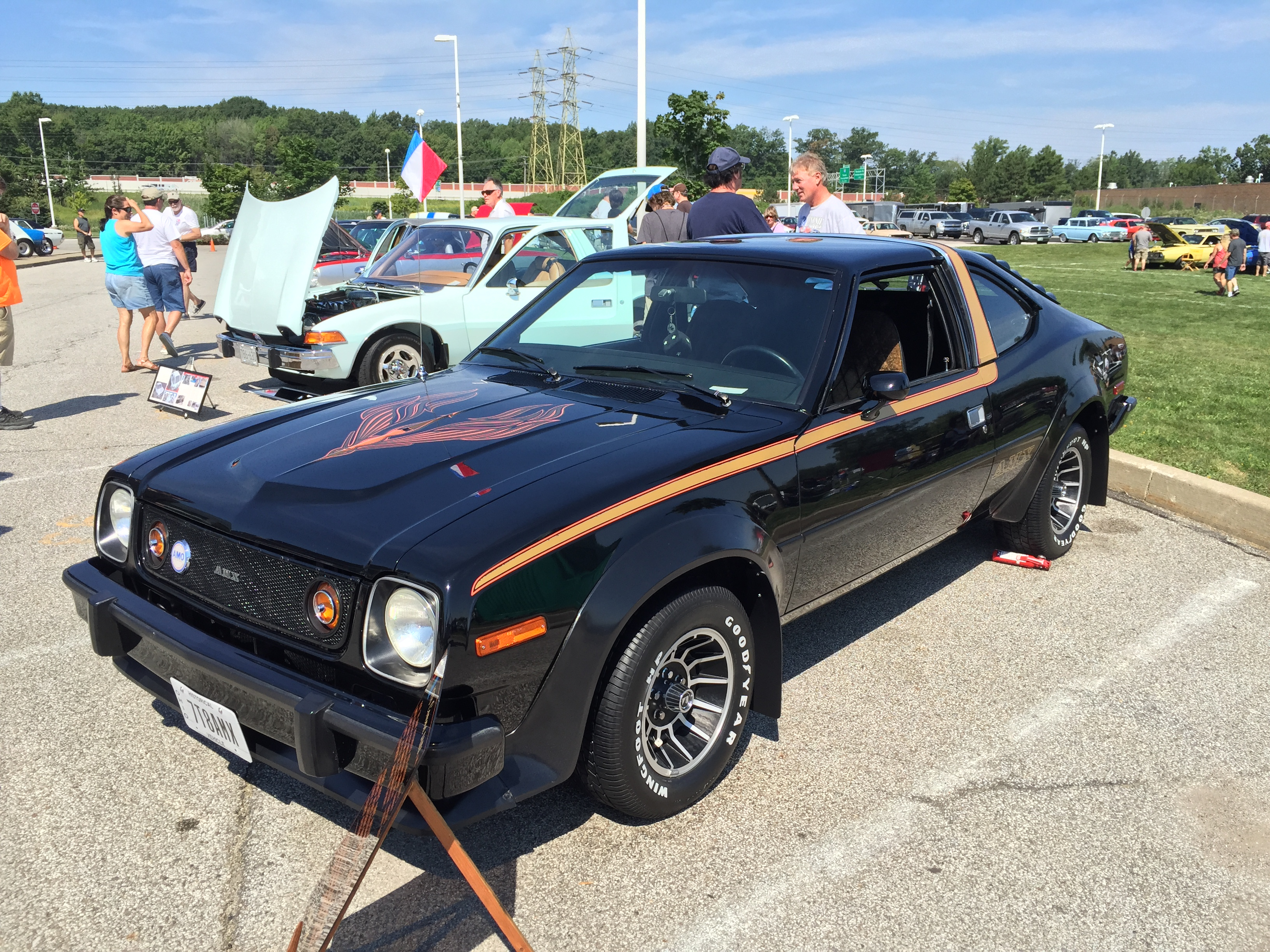
1978 AMC AMX in black

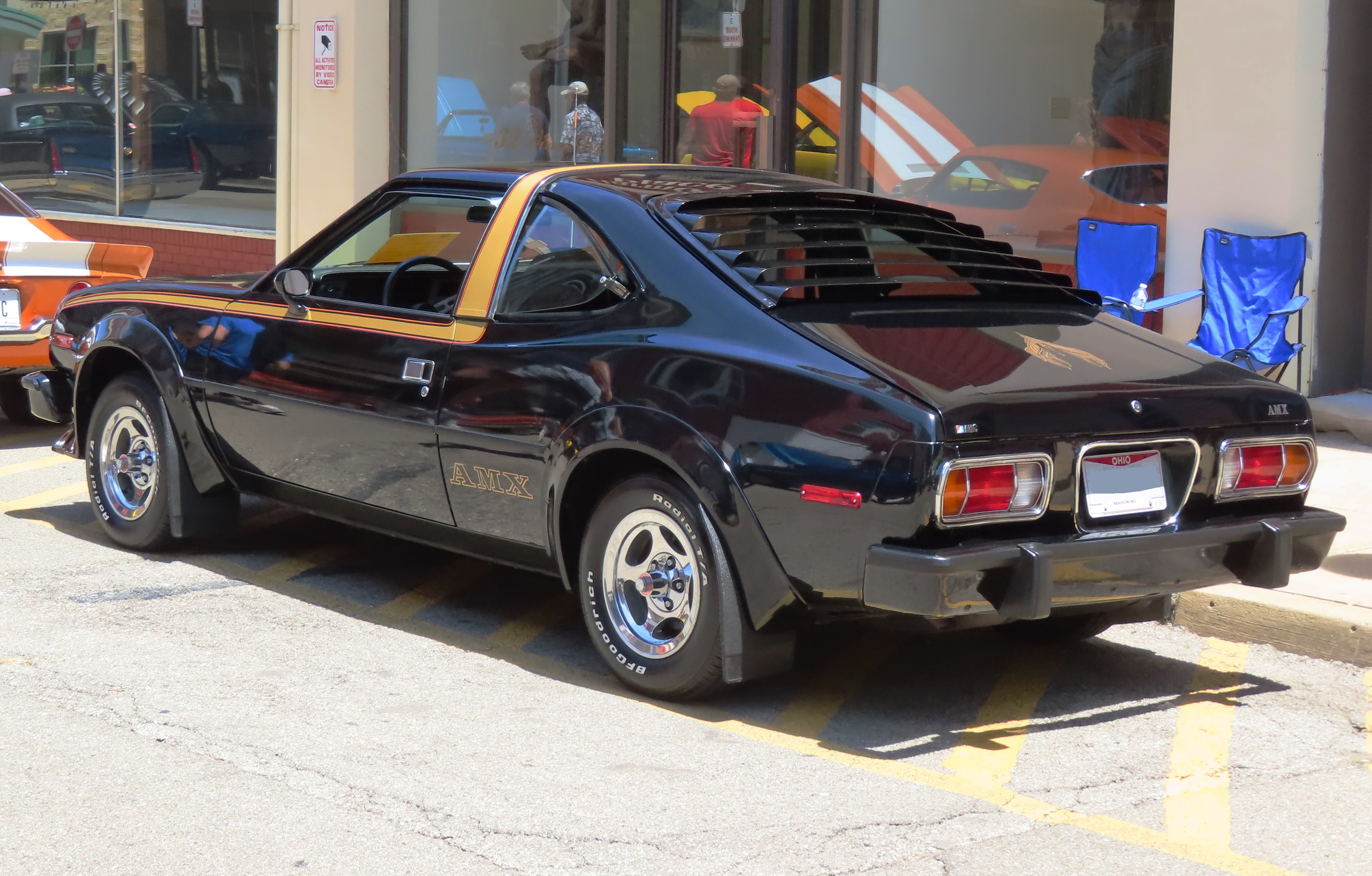
1978 AMC AMX in black

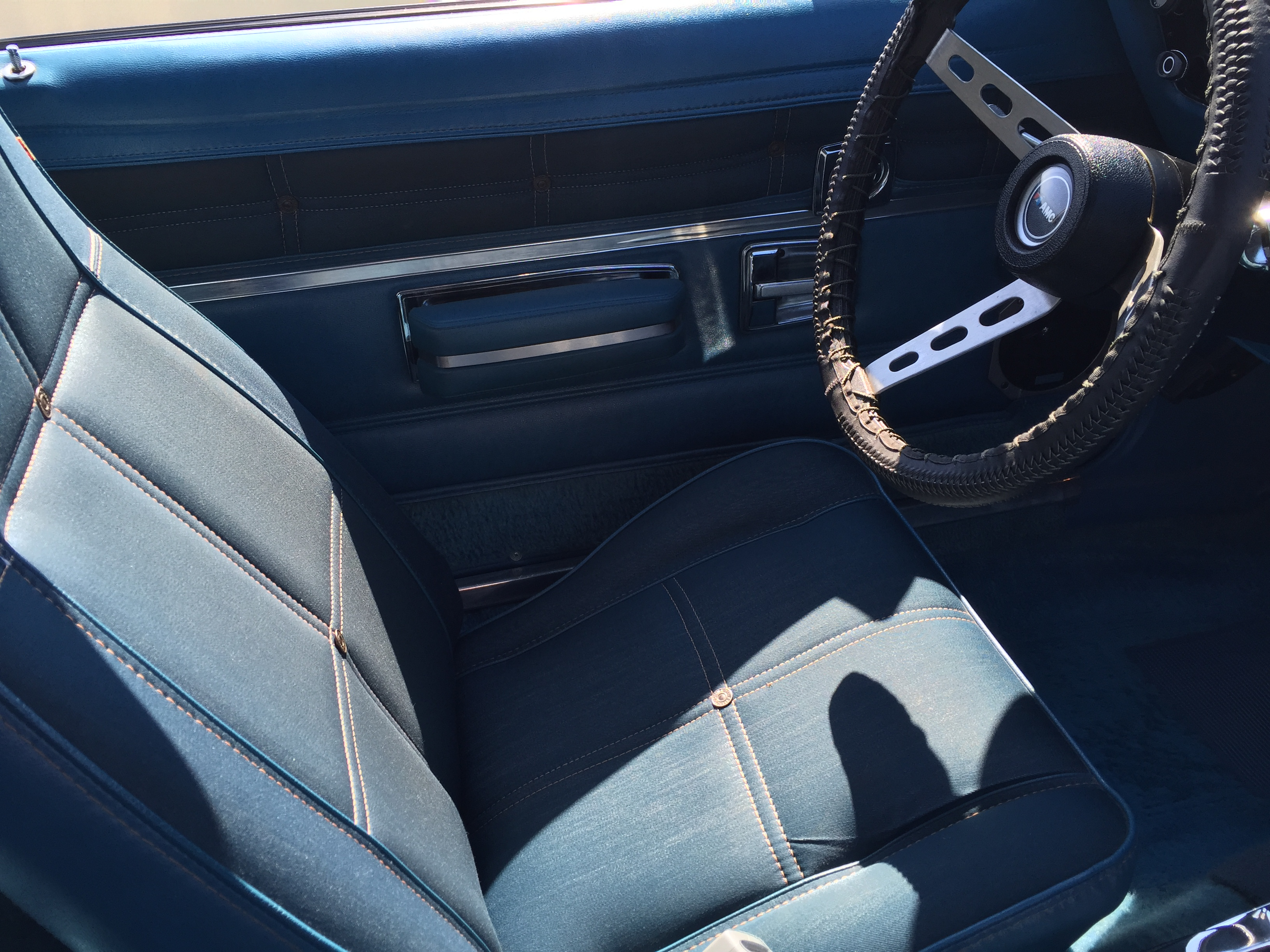
1978 AMC AMX with Levi's trim

Reviving a name that was associated with the performance two-seat AMC AMX sports car that was introduced ten years earlier, AMC fielded a new model in the youth and performance market segment. Based on the Concord hatchback model, the new AMX became a separate series for 1978. The distinction included the VIN, with the sixth digit being 7 on Concords and 9 on the AMX models. The cars did not have Concord badges or identification, but the two-door hatchback was said to represent "the performance expression of the Concord line" by automotive journalists. Rather than just an option package as on the 1977 Hornet hatchback model, AMC emphasized the distinction between its new luxury-oriented Concords and the sports car image of the new AMX by separating the models in its 1978 sales literature. Two pages illustrated and described the main features in a section titled "AMC AMX Hatchback" emphasizing the model's "bold design transforms everyday driving into an exciting experience" while the Concord-based hatchback focused on the full-width rear hatch and flip down rear seat for hauling gear along with lots of room up front for driver and passenger.

In contrast to the Concord hatchback, the AMX version included a different front fascia with single round headlights, a flush grille, round amber parking lights, and a "power bulge" hood from the Gremlin line. Engines included the standard 258 cu in (4.2 L) I6 with a four-speed manual or optional three-speed automatic floor shifted transmission or the optional 304 cu in (5.0 L) V8 available only with a three-speed automatic. A factory 401 cu in (6.6 L) V8 with a four-speed manual could have been a special order example.

The AMX included performance DR78×14 black sidewall steel-belted radial tires, front sway bar, "rally gauges" with tachometer and full instrumentation, a center floor console, brushed aluminum instrument panel overlays, black "soft-feel" sports steering wheel, and unique trim on the door panels with map pockets. The standard interior color selection was limited to black, blue, or beige, with "soft-feel vinyl bucket seats with optional upholstery featuring the "Levi's" Trim Package in the same three colors.

The exterior featured a blacked-out grille, headlight bezels, rear window molding, door and quarter window frames, rear license plate depression, wiper arms, a black front air dam, black front and rear fender flares, dual flat black rear-view mirrors, black rear window louvers, black body side scuff moldings, silver "targa" roof band, contrasting "AMX" decals on the bodyside ahead of the rear wheel openings, silver slot-styled steel wheels, as well as body-color painted bumpers with black rubber guards and scuff moldings.

Exterior colors were limited to Alpine White, Firecracker Red, Sunshine Yellow, Quick Silver Metallic, or Classic Black. Only the cars finished in black included gold body side stripes that continued up and over the roof band, as well as gold paint accents for the standard slot-styled wheels. The windshield reveal moldings were also blacked out with the Classic Black exterior paint color selection. The rear quarter windows opened "flipper-type" with belt moldings on the door and quarter windows. The rear lights featured tri-colored lenses. A carryover 1977 Hornet AMX decal was optional for the rear deck and hood, available in either gold with orange or black with gold. Polished forged aluminum five-spoke road wheels were optional.

According to automotive journalist Michael Lamm, the new AMX had "noticeably tighter shocks and gives a firm and comfortable ride"; "corner[s] with the very best" with little lean, as well as the standard six-cylinder engine that combines good performance with fuel economy, and the four-speed "gearbox that's fun to use and has long, long gears." The automaker's marketing campaign for the new AMX included a separate dealer promotional video focusing on the youthfulness and fun to drive characteristics. Product placement of the 1978 AMX included the Wonder Woman TV series. Approximately 2,500 AMXs were built for the 1978 model year.

The 1978 AMX's "great styling combined with over-the-top graphics and competent handling" make them "bone fide collectible" cars today, despite a lack of "serious muscle."

== Convertibles ==
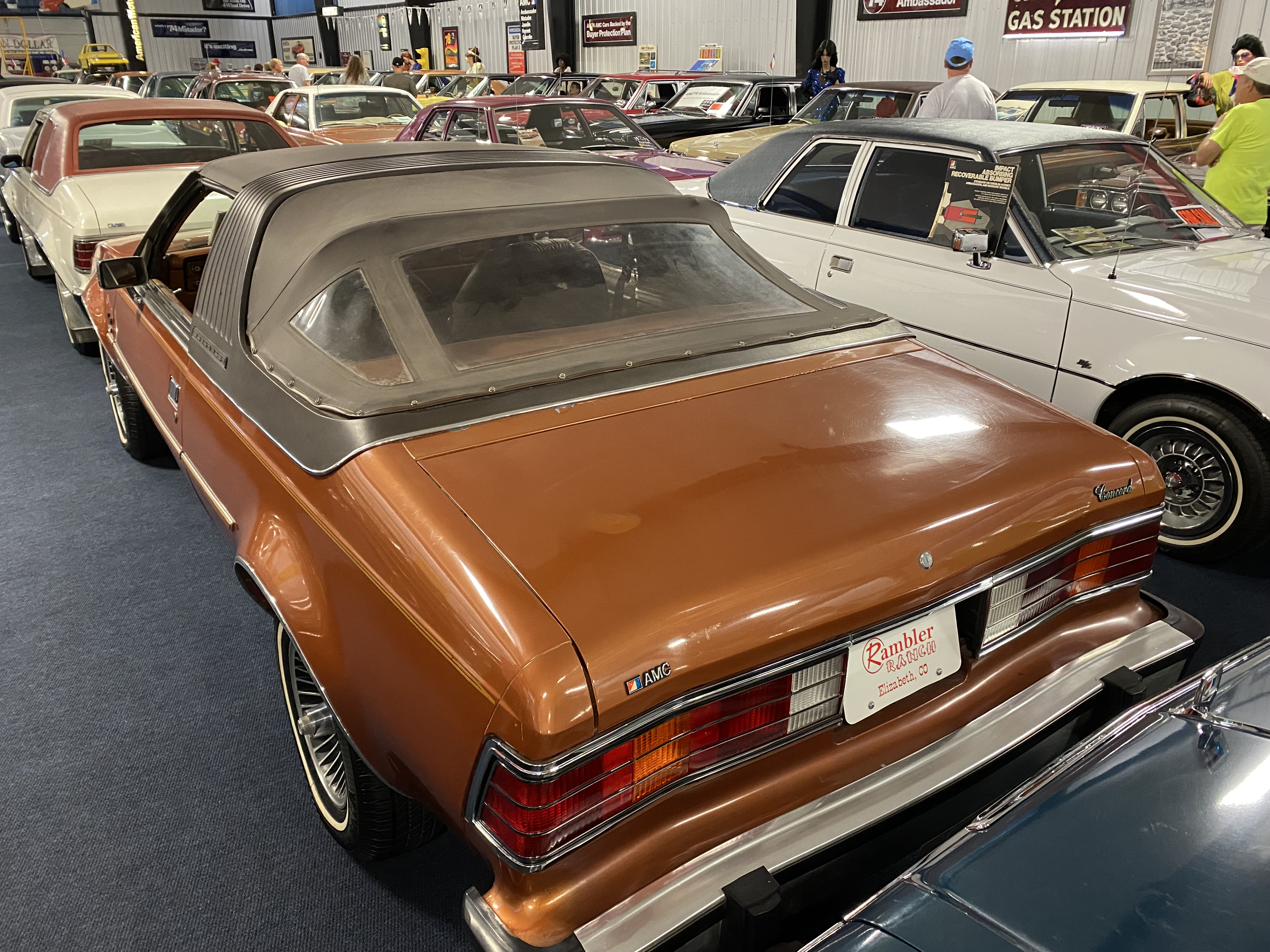
1981 AMC Concord Limited Sundancer convertible at Rambler Ranch

A Sundancer convertible conversion by Griffith Company was available for the 1981 and 1982 model years. The Sundancer was available one year before the introduction of the 1982 convertible Chrysler LeBaron versions that were prepared by Cars and Concepts. Buick announced in 1982 a similar aftermarket convertible for the Buick Riviera#Sixth generation (1979–1985) and contacted American Sun Roof (ASC), but the models were not available for sale for many months.

The modifications to the Concord started with a two-door sedan monocoque (unitized) body. To add strength to the platform after the removal of its roof, fourteen steel reinforcements were welded to the undercarriage, and a steel targa roll bar was welded to the door pillars for rigidity, as well as additional passenger compartment protection. The front section of the roof (ahead of the targa bar) was a removable lightweight fiberglass hatch. In contrast, the rear section of polyvinyl material folded and included a tonneau cover for use in the down position.

The cars were available through any AMC dealer, but less than 200 conversions were manufactured (Concord and four-wheel-drive Eagle versions).

== VAM models ==
The Mexican government-owned automaker Vehiculos Automotores Mexicanos (VAM) manufactured several models in Mexico under license from AMC. The made-in-Mexico vehicles had to have at least 60% locally sourced parts. VAM cars came with different trim and interiors than the equivalent AMC-made models. They were marketed as the VAM American. In addition to rebadged Concords, VAM developed the unique VAM Lerma that was based on the Concord coupe and sedan with the addition of the AMC Spirit's hatchback and rear end design along with its unique quarter glass treatment.

All engines built by VAM were of AMC design with appropriate changes to deal with lower octane gasoline and the higher altitudes in Mexico. Additionally, VAM developed a 282 cu in (4.6 L) version of AMC's I6 engine. The I4 and V8 engines, as well as five-speed manual transmissions, were not available in VAM-built cars. The three-speed manual transmission continued as the standard in all base models through 1983, while the four-speed manual was limited to performance models. All high-trim versions included automatic transmissions. The hatchback models were unavailable in base or DL trim, nor were the Griffith-converted Sundancer models.

=== 1978 ===
The Concord-based VAM American started as the "second generation" of the economy and luxury line of intermediate VAM compacts following the first generation of 1975 through 1977 Hornet-based Americans. The 1978 base models were called "American Sedan" and "Camioneta American" by VAM. The standard 258 cu in (4.2 L) I6 engine came with a single-barrel carburetor and three-speed manual transmission with a column-shift on the wagon and four-door models, or a floor-mounted shifter on the two-door versions. A three-speed automatic transmission was optional with a column-mounted shifter in all three body styles, and ordering it included power steering, bumper guards, and a heater at no extra cost in both the sedan versions. The base wagon included the heater. A high-trim upgrade for the wagon was included when the automatic transmission was ordered. The four-door sedan and wagon featured a front bench seat, while two-door sedans had individual low-back, non-reclining seats. Standard were non-power brakes with front disks and rear drums, front sway bar, manual steering, a 3.31:1 rear differential gear ratio, plain blacked-out dashboard, a 140 km/h (87 mph) dual marked speedometer, fixed three-point front seatbelts (retractable on the base wagon), inside hood release, front ashtray, lighter, locking glove box, AM radio with antenna, rear ashtrays, round dome light, two-speed wipers, electric washers, flat volcano hubcaps with exposed lug nuts, "American" fender emblems, "4.2" rear quarter emblems, manual driver's side rearview mirror, base steering wheel, and a roof rack (wagon only). Factory options included power brakes, power steering (with manual transmission), heavy-duty springs and shocks, wheel trim rings, a sports-style steering wheel, luxury steering wheel, passenger's side remote mirror, tinted windshield, parcel shelf (standard on wagon), a bright molding package (wheel arches, drip rails, rocker panels, front hood edge, hood ornament), bumper guards (with manual transmission), and heater (for manual sedans).

The top-of-the-line models were named "American GFS" (equivalent to the U.S. Concord DL two-door), "American ECD" (Concord DL four-door), and "Camioneta American Automática" (Concord DL wagon). All three featured automatic transmissions, power brakes, power steering, 282 cu in (4.6 L) I6 engines (the 258 was standard on ECD models) with new-for-the-year Motorcraft two-barrel carburetor and 8.0:1 compression ratio, 3.07:1 rear gear ratio, light group (ashtray, glove box, hood, under the dashboard, and trunk (except on wagons)), custom steering wheel, woodgrain trim on the dashboard, a parcel shelf, clock, retractable seat belts, luxury upholstery, tinted windshield, bright molding package, "4.6" emblems ("4.2" on ECD), full wheel covers, and bumper guards. The GFS model included a floor-shift transmission and reclining individual high-back seats, while the ECD and automatic wagon had a column-mounted shifter and a front bench seat. Both sedan models incorporated vinyl roofs either in full- (ECD) or Landau-type (GFS). In contrast with AMC's U.S. versions was the two-door GFS because it included flip-open rear quarter windows along with the Targa-style band used in the 1977 AMC Hornet AMX models (the same design as on the Hornet-based 1977 VAM American GFS). The optional equipment list on VAM Americans included an air conditioning system with heavy-duty cooling (seven-blade flexible fan, three-line radiator, fan shroud, coolant recovery tank, and a 55-amp alternator), reading dome lights, remote-controlled driver's side mirror, passenger's side remote mirror, and rear window defroster.

=== 1979 ===
For the 1979 model year, all versions of the VAM American included redesigned aluminum bumpers with plastic side end caps, quad headlights over a transparent parking light, and a "waterflow" plastic grille. The station wagon with automatic transmission obtained a new designation, the "Camioneta American DL". The American GFS was similar to its AMC counterpart by dropping the targa-style band but continuing the Landau half-vinyl top. The side opera windows were changed to fixed glass with a VAM-designed sandblasted GFS emblem. The base and high-trim versions shared resigned door panels with the top-trimmed versions gaining a carpeted lower insert and map pouches. This was the first time trim and upholstery differentiated between the models. All cars with column-mounted shifters and automatic transmissions had a new gear indicator integrated into the speedometer. This replaced the indicators mounted on the steering column. A quartz digital version replaced the mechanical flip-style clock. The list of optional equipment was expanded to include a monaural AM/FM radio on the ECD and DL wagon (standard on the GFS). No full-wheel covers were offered; thus, the top models incorporated bright, narrow volcano-style hubcaps with a VAM logo as well as wheel trim rings. The custom steering wheel featured a new design with a soft rectangular button and a small metal VAM emblem.

==== American 06/S ====
A unique high-performance version of the two-door sedan the "American 06/S" was featured for 1979. It included the VAM-modified 282 cu in (4.6 L) engine, codenamed 4.6/X. The net rating was 172 hp (128 kW; 174 PS) at 4200 rpm and 225 lb⋅ft (305.1 N⋅m) of torque at 2600 rpm. It featured a 302-degree duration degree camshaft (compared to 266° stock camshaft), 8.5:0 compression ratio (8.0:1 stock), a Holley 2300 two-barrel carburetor (Motorcraft 2150 stock 282 carburetor), semi-ported engine head, headers with dual final outlets and exhausts, Prestolite electronic distributor with modified advance curves for higher acceleration, reinforced rebalanced crankshaft and a clutch fan (seven-bladed flexible stock heavy-duty cooling fan). This engine was the evolution of VAM's earlier "Go Pack" 282 engine from the early 1970s. This engine was commercialized because of an exemption in emission certification of up to 500 engine units per year, allowing the automarkers the creation of special models.

The 06/S model came standard with power brakes with front disks, power steering, front sway bar, heavy-duty suspension (stiffer springs and shocks), Tremec 170-F four-speed manual transmission with Hurst linkage, Spicer 44 rear differential with a 3.31:1 gear ratio, heavy-duty cooling (coolant recovery tank, fan shroud, and three-line radiator), leather-wrapped three-spoke sports steering wheel, reclining high-back bucket seats, dynamic three-point front seat belts, a center console with armrest and Rallye gauges (clock, vacuum meter, ammeter, and oil pressure) with an ashtray for the rear seat occupants, digital tachometer, woodgrain overlays on the dashboard, parcel shelf, full light group (except dome), an AM radio with a passenger-side rear quarter panel-mounted antenna, dual remote-controlled body-colored mirrors, tinted windshield, blacked-out bumpers, VAM-designed sports steel grille, eight-spoke 14×6 steel wheels with blacked-out volcano center caps, and D70×14 radial tires. The "Hornet in Flames" decal design by AMC found on the 1977 and 1978 AMXs was used on the hood and trunk lid of the 06/S as well as large white "06/S" decals on each quarter panel. The front and rear side panels were the same as the base model American two-door models rather than the high-trim upholstery with bottom carpet inserts and map pouches of GFS and Rally AMX models. Factory options for the O6/S included a sunroof, rear defroster, reading dome light, and an AM/FM radio. Because of the performance focus and engine specifications, automatic transmission and air conditioning were not available. A total of 499 units were produced, making it the most collectible Concord-based model for Mexico and practically the closest local equivalent of the 1971 Hornet SC/360 model. The 06/S was a one-year model as its replacement was the Spirit liftback "Rally GT" starting in 1980.

=== 1980 ===
The 1980 VAM Americans incorporated the changes designed by AMC for the U.S. Concords. Included were the full-width tail lights, rectangular opera windows on the two-door GFS (continuing the sandblasted "GFS" emblem of the previous year), the added four-door C-pillar windows on the ECD (with sandblasted emblems), and optional simulated wood bodyside trim for the American DL wagon for the first time. All versions came with a VAM-designed grille made of aluminum. This was the first time a front-end design differed from the equivalent AMC version. The high-trim models included argent polyurethane design full-wheel covers with the AMC logo on the center cap replaced by a VAM logo. This was VAM's first use of non-metal wheel covers. The three top-end models came standard with dual rearview mirrors with remote controls, and the shell-like semioval design in body color, which were optional equipment in the previous years. The American ECD now included the 282 cu in (4.6 L) I6 as standard (with the rear quarter panel emblem changes to the "4.6"). All high-trim VAM Americans were powered by the largest I6 engine. Equipment that became standard for the year included a flexible seven-blade fan and three-line radiator for all engines, essentially half of the heavy-duty cooling package.

All models featured as standard equipment a locking gas cap, a new 180 kilometres per hour (110 mph) speedometer, and front seat adjustable headrests regardless of trim level. The high-end VAM models expanded the options list to include intermittent wipers, power door locks, power windows, power trunk release (ECD and GFS only), electric antenna, and an AM/FM stereo radio (instead of the previous year's monaural units). A lighted vanity mirror and safety reflectors fixed onto the front door armrests were now standard equipment for the three top-end models. Door and side panels now included a curved plastic portion on their top part to cover the body-colored metal under the side rear windows and door glass that was previously covered by glued texturized vinyl that was color-keyed to the interior in the 1978 and 1979 models. Improved and luxurious B-pillar and headliner side moldings also debuted on the high-trim units. The American GFS switched to column-shifted transmission control, retaining the individual reclining seat configuration. The three base models now included a heater as well as high back front seats. The base models' interior side and door panels continued the previous year's design. The base American wagon now had power steering as standard. The custom steering wheel became standard in all six models, the only difference between the ones used in the high-trim models and the base ones being the metal rectangular woodgrain molding surrounding the padded horn button.

=== 1981 ===
The VAM American for 1981 in high trim obtained improvements as a luxury vehicle. All body styles included as standard equipment a rear defroster, reading dome lights, intermittent wipers, dual remote-controlled mirrors (new-for-the-year AMC squared chromed design), and AM/FM stereo radio. The options list now added a tilt steering column and power seats. The previous year's side panels with texturized vinyl tops were replaced by new high-trim fabric units keeping the carpet inserts but no longer having the map pouches. All cars, regardless of trim level, had the AMC-designed Spirit grille for 1981. Included were a fan shroud and coolant recovery tank, thus making all cars have the heavy-duty cooling system. Appearance changes included "Noryl" wheel covers replacing the Argent design for the high-trim versions.

The base models were upgraded, and ordering any of the three body styles with the automatic transmission now included: a quartz digital clock, retractable seat belts, tinted windshield, parcel shelf, full light group (courtesy, ashtray, glove box, hood, trunk lid) except reading dome light, woodgrain trim on the dashboard, wheel trim rings, full bright molding package (front hood edge, rocker panels, wheel lips, drip rails) except the central hood unit with the VAM ornament, and protective rubber side moldings. These were in addition to the already standard power steering and bumper guards. This positioned a mid-range model between the base and the GFS/ECD/DL versions. The automatic base wagon was not a DL. In 1981 and 1982, there were four versions of the station wagon model: base manual, base automatic, basic DL, and equipped DL. Despite this change, no special designation or distinction for the new better-equipped base models. VAM's marketing focused on having buyers request dealer-installed accessories. At the time, buyers typically took cars as they were at the dealership without upgrading them. This strategy also meant a more efficient protocol for VAM's production department, saving time and effort in assembling individual cars based on individual customer-ordered options. The practice of packaging options was not limited to the base models. The three high-trim Americans were also offered an optional package of all-power equipment, a tilt steering column, and an air conditioning system. Engine displacement emblems in both base and high-trim models were removed from the rear quarter panels. Similarly to the three high-trim models the year before, the three base models also obtained full-size door panels covering the top portion of their doors with an exclusive design. Despite this, the rear sides (two-door) and the portions behind the rear doors (four-door and wagon) remained the same as the years before, with exposed metal parts painted body color.

==== Lerma ====
The VAM Lerma model was introduced for 1981. This was an adaptation combining the central and front portions of the VAM American sedan with the rear third of the smaller Rally coupe creating a line of three- and five-door hatchbacks in a European style. It was intended to be VAM's most luxurious model and new flagship product of the company, the first since the 1976 VAM Classic DPL (equivalent to the AMC Matador sedan in the U.S. and Canada).

=== 1982 ===
Mexico's 1982 recession and currency devaluation weakened the economy and negatively affected the domestic automotive market. The dire situation, coupled with a government decree banning the importation of automotive accessories deemed "luxurious and non-vital to the vehicle" took its toll on standard and optional equipment for all cars sold in Mexico. Mexican automakers needed to source or produce these locally or replace them with a close equivalent. Because some had no domestic alternatives, the features were discontinued. The high-trimmed VAM Americans for 1982 were no longer available with power door locks, power windows, power trunk release, power seats, tilt steering column, quartz digital clock, rear defroster, wheel covers, and AMC's rectangular chromed remote mirrors. Items that were standard for 1981 such as the remote controls for the door mirrors, the intermittent wipers, the reading dome light, and the vanity mirror were put on the options list as either individual accessories or all of them (except mirror controls) being included as part of an air conditioning package. VAM continued the strategy of consolidating options. The remaining features were unchanged except for the new factory option of an AM/FM/stereo tape player system. Due to the loss of the chromed squared design, high-trim Americans reverted to the body-colored shell-type mirrors used in the 1980 models, while the base models continued to showcase the existing oval chromed versions used in most VAM cars since 1970.

All three high-trim editions featured a new VAM-designed grille with a rectangular pattern, while the three base models used AMC's square-pattern design borrowed from U.S. market Eagle models, marking for the first time a different grille design for each trim level. The GFS, ECD, and DL models had VAM-designed bumper end caps with a horizontal chrome molding on the top side edge. The ones for the front bumper were the same size as the originals, while those for the rear bumper were longer than their AMC counterparts, thus filling the gap between the body and bumper. AMC's Eagle black nerfing strip design was also applied to the bumpers. The headlight bezels changed to blacked-out units in their internal sections keeping the chromed surrounding areas. All-new aluminum road wheels with narrow chromed volcano center caps also replaced the previously imported Noryl wheel covers.

A unique version of the year was the American ECD, which featured a lengthened and squared rear roofline with smaller and more rectangular C-pillar windows that had a smaller "ECD" sand-blasted logo at the bottom instead of at the center like the two years before. Other changes included black quarter window surrounds for the American DL wagon that was used on AMC's Eagle wagons. The American GFS had plain side window panels. All six versions featured a new taillight finish with the previously silver-painted stripes and surrounds were changed into blackout form. The transparent front-end parking lights used since 1979 were replaced by new amber lenses. Both versions of the three base models were the same as in 1981 except for the grille design, new door panels, new seat patterns, and the absence of the quartz clock in the automatic cars. Early in the year, a new head design was introduced for the 282 cu in (4.6 L) I6 engine with smaller spark plug openings and improved intake ports while still retaining the metal valve cover. The compression ratio was increased from 8.0:1 to 8.5:1 for both engines. The automatic transmissions obtained wider gear ratios.

=== 1983 ===
Following the nation's economic turmoil of 1982, Renault de México took over VAM from the Mexican government in February 1983. As with AMC, Renault was most interested in the Jeep line, VAM's production facilities, and its established dealer network. As soon as the agreement was finalized, Renault ordered the termination of VAM's passenger car line so it would not compete with its products. VAM's 1983 models were assembled to use up existing inventories, fulfilling previous agreements with suppliers, and fulfilling customer orders. The American line for 1983 included the two-door sedan, a body style that was discontinued by AMC in 1982.

The 1983 models received a new grille and headlight bezel designs. The external lines of both sets of parts changed from being vertical to diagonal from top to bottom until reaching the top back edge of the front bumper, creating a more aerodynamic look and practically covering up the gap between the bumper and the rest of the front end. Headlights and parking lights were the same units used in last year's models; the grille was characterized by a design of six horizontal rectangles consisting of two sets of three rectangles placed one in the left half of the grille and the other on the right half. Unlike the previous year, both the base and luxury models shared the same grille design as in the 1978 through 1981 models. Also new was a locally sourced reproduction of the luxury squared chromed mirror, now having the VAM logo near the mirror base where AMC's was originally. This design was to again have remote-controlled mirrors with a luxury appearance in its top-end models, but the manual-adjusted versions became standard for all 1983 VAM cars.

Both sedan models were available as the base manual transmission and semi-equipped automatic transmission versions. The cars now included more standard features including power brakes, power steering, and dual remote mirrors (without remote control). Cars with manual transmissions had a parcel shelf with two courtesy lights and a set of eight-spoke sports steel wheels with blacked-out volcano center caps as standard. Cars with automatic transmission included cost aluminum road wheels with chromed volcano hubcaps, the same high-trim upholstery door panels and seat designs as the previous GFS and ECD models along with door armrest safety reflectors and dual rear ashtrays (single central ashtray on the rear of the front seat back on the four-door), high-trim front hood edge molding and a central over-the-hood bright molding with a VAM ornament at the front edge. The two-door automatic models also had a reclining mechanism for their front seats while both automatic sedans' rear seat had a fold-down center armrest concealed at the seat back. The interior of 1983 VAM Americans base sedans with automatic transmission was close to that of the previous year's GFS and ECD models.

The American DL station wagon model was the only high-trim American model to be available. For 1983, the base automatic and the basic DL were merged into a single version alongside the equipped DL and the base manual, creating three versions for the year unlike the four of the last two years. The mid-range version had the same equipment as the four-door sedan models with automatic transmission of the year including the 258 cu in (4.2 L) I6 engine, it was also called "American DL" and carried the same exterior woodgrain trim and moldings that were not available in the base automatics of the previous two years. The differences between the mid-range DL and the top-of-the-line DL are the presence of the AM/FM stereo radio with four speakers, reading dome light, lighted vanity mirror, intermittent wipers, air conditioning, and the 282 cu in (4.6 L) I6 engine in the latter model. The base model and mid-range DL included the 258 cu in (4.2 L) I6 engine, an AM monoaural radio, two-speed wipers, no vanity mirror, and only a round dome light. The visual distinction between a mid-range DL from a top-of-the-line DL was limited to the bumpers; featuring VAM's in-house luxurious cap designs and nerfing strips that were introduced in the 1982 top models on the higher-equipped wagon while the mid-range featured regular chrome bumpers without nerfing strips and the original AMC bumper cap design. Only the top-of-the-line DL with air conditioning included the 282 cu in (4.6 L) I6 while the remaining two wagons had the 258 cu in (4.2 L), which in this year featured a partial head redesign with smaller spark plug outlets and improved intake ports following the engineering upgrades of the 1982 282 head. However, the valve cover design was now plastic as used by AMC on the 258 while the 282 continued to use the metal unit this year. Both automatic sedans equipped with air conditioning included the 282 cu in (4.6 L) I6 engine and five additional accessories of the top-of-the-line DL wagon. The only factory optional accessories available that were always separated from edition equipment were the AM/FM stereo tape player radio, remote-controlled door mirrors, and electric antenna. Leftover 1983 VAM Americans were sold as 1984 models.

=== American Rally AMX ===
In 1978 and 1979, VAM offered a regular production performance model within the American line aside from the economy-based models and luxury GFS/ECD/DL units. This was the American Rally AMX, a successor to VAM's 1975 through 1977 American Rally and the Mexican equivalent of the 1978 AMC Concord AMX. In both years, the model served as the VAM's top-of-the-line sports product of the company, except for the limited edition 1979 American 06/S.

==== 1978 ====
In its first year, the American Rally AMX was cosmetically almost the same as its U.S. counterpart. Both versions shared the same rear louvers, fender extensions, front air dam, side stripe, body-colored bumpers with guards and nerfing strips, shell-type door mirrors, roof Targa band, and mesh-grating grille design with round parking lights and central AMX emblem. The only different characteristics of the Mexican vehicle were the in-house five-spoke wheels with chromed volcano hubcaps and trim rings, the presence of original "Rally AMX" decals just under the regular side stripes (replacing AMC's lower body "AMX" design for the model), the "Rally" and "4.6" emblems, and the lack of the "Hornet in Flames" hood decal. Another visual difference took place in the midyear as VAM's customers did not like the mesh grille design as "simplistic and rough-looking". VAM changed the design incorporating rectangular parking lights placed vertically and between them, a set of three vertical lines (left, center, right), and a central horizontal line passing through them, behind this was a mesh grating half smaller in size as the original.

In the interior, both cars were far more different. The VAM car had woodgrain overlays over the front dashboard surfaces instead of brushed aluminum, a digital tachometer, a Hurst T-shaped shifter, a VAM logo over the horn button, a "Rally" emblem over the glove box door, reclining front bucket seats with a round border pattern on the fabric as well as on the side and door panels. In midyear, VAM replaced the round border pattern with a horizontal-line design in one or two tones due to criticism and rejection from customers. Mechanically, the model is restricted to only the 200 hp (149 kW; 203 PS) VAM 282 cu in (4.6 L) I6 engine with Tremec 170-F four-speed manual transmission with Hurst linkage or optional Chrysler Torque Flyte A998 three-speed automatic transmission with a 3.31:1 rear differential gear ratio with both transmissions. Factory equipment included power front disk and rear drum brakes, power steering, front sway bar, heavy-duty springs and shocks, a regular cooling system (rigid four-bladed fan and two-line radiator), as well as D70×14 radial tires.

==== 1979 ====
The American Rally AMX was carried over for 1979 with substantial cosmetic changes that gave the model a higher level of originality within VAM and pushed it away from AMC's 1978 original. The body featured all-new side decal designs in two tones that were mostly straight and surrounded the side protective rubber moldings. The portion under the rear side windows grew thicker and housed an "AMX over Rally" decal using the same typography and design as the previous model, the legend "AMX" on top of the "Rally" one. All glass frames and moldings, volcano hubcaps, door mirrors, rocker panels, and bumpers were blacked out. AMC's dual-quad headlight design with transparent parking lights was adopted alongside an in-house VAM sporty grille design with four horizontal bars shared with the Gremlin X and American 06/S models of the same year. Both bumpers were changed to the new smaller aluminum units with side end caps, bumper guards, and nerfing strips. A unique feature of this model is the radio antenna placed on top of the passenger's side rear quarter panel, instead of the top of the right front fender.

The model was mechanically the same as the previous model, except the engine's output was measured using the net rating system, which made it now 132 hp (98 kW; 134 PS) at 4200 rpm. The interiors now included AMC's new center console design with a rear ashtray, armrest, as well as Rallye gauges along with AMC's shifter designs for both transmissions. The seat designs for the model were the same as in the second half of the year of the previous model year, while the door and side panels were redesigned with higher appointments of luxury including carpet inserts on the lower portion. The presence of the rear ashtray within the center console eliminated the need for dual-side ashtrays found in the 1978 models.

The American Rally AMX was discontinued at the end of the 1979 model year to make way for the new Spirit coupe-based Rally AMX for 1980. Unlike under AMC, it was the only version available for the Hornet/Concord hatchback body style in Mexico, meaning the base and DL models offered by AMC in 1978 and 1979 were not offered.

==== Rally Racing ====
The American Rally AMX participated in the competitions organized by the National Rallying Committee of Mexico (Comisión Nacional de Rallies) in 1978 with official support from VAM. The silver-painted car was piloted by Mexican driver and team member Jorge Serrano. He had a prototype version of the "4.6/X" high-performance 282 cu in (4.6 L) I6 engine that was later used in the American 06/S and Rally GT models. The cars became the national champion in the make and navigator departments, while Ford de México's team captured the driver's championship. For the 1979 Rally Mexico season, VAM's team switched to two Gremlin X cars.

== Racing ==
Tom Reffner, who won sixty-seven features driving an AMC Javelin during the 1975 season, campaigned his 1978 Concord AMX in races that included winning the April 8 ARTGO opener in 1979 at Wisconsin's Madison Capital Raceway with temperatures just above freezing. He also set the Wisconsin International Raceway track record with an average speed of 89.3 miles per hour (144 km/h) or 20.155 seconds for the lap during time trials, but placed second in the NKG 50 feature race, just two car lengths behind Dick Trickle. For the season, Reffner had 21 feature wins, and added 16 more in 1979 with the AMX, thus continuing an "outstanding" racing record in AMC cars from 1975 until a wreck at Elko in 1979.

An AMC Concord was entered in the 1978 World Challenge for Endurance Drivers. The car started the endurance race at the Six-Hours of Talladega Camel GT Challenge with 40 other cars, but was driven by Bo Montgomery for only one lap on 4 February 1978.

The same car was driven by Buzz Cason and Rick Knoop at the International Motor Sports Association (IMSA) Pepsi Six-Hour Champion Spark Plug Challenge at the Daytona International Speedway three days later and finished in 17th (out of 71 cars) with 130 laps.

On 9 March 1978, the Concord driven by Buzz Cason and Richard Valentine placed 27th (out of 70 entered) with 162 laps racing the Six-Hour Champion Spark Plug Challenge at Road Atlanta.

A 1979 AMC Concord was campaigned on the west coast from 1978 through 1981 by Buzz Dyer. Power was provided by a Traco Engineering-prepared AMC 366 cu in (6.0 L) V8 engine. It was initially in the Penske AMC Matador that won the 1973 season-opening event at Riverside driven by Mark Donohue. The Concord raced in six Trans Am events, as well as International Motor Sports Association (IMSA) events with a GTO entry and several IMSA AC races.

The car was in the following Kelly American Challenge races: the 1979 Road Atlanta and Mid-Ohio, the 1980 Golden State and in Portland, as well as the 1981 Sears Point and Portland events. On 24 June 1982, Buzz Dyer set a record 37-position improvement when he started in 48th place in his Concord and finished the Portland race in eleventh, a feat that stood in the SCCA NTB Trans-Am Series until the 1998 season. This Concord car was wun with other drivers in the SCCA GT-1 races through 1990.

Three or four drivers in the country raced the AMC Concord.

== Experimental engines ==
=== Stirling ===
The Mexican-built VAM Lerma version of the AMC Concord served as the promotional and test vehicle for the Stirling engine. For the study, a 1980 four-door Lerma sedan was fitted with a P-40 engine and used to inform the public about the Stirling engine. AM General subsidiary of AMC was the major subcontractor for engine and vehicle integration for "The Automotive Stirling Engine Development Program" awarded to MIT by NASA with funding by DOE. One of the demonstration vehicles was the Concord-based Lerma. Additionally, a 1979 AMC Spirit engineering test vehicle was also tested extensively to develop and demonstrate practical alternatives to the traditional engines. The tests revealed that the type of engine "could be developed into an automotive power train for passenger vehicles and that it could produce favorable results."

=== Gas turbine ===
A 1980 AMC Concord was the test vehicle in the conceptual design study of the automotive-based Improved Gas Turbine (IGT) powertrain. Working under a NASA contract for U.S. DOE's Division of Automotive Technology Development, Williams Research performed the design and analysis of the gas turbine engine. AMC's AM General subsidiary supplied the vehicle, transmission, and drivetrain, along with the typical car convenience accessories as well as completed the engine installation studies. The two-door sedan used a dual-rotor gas turbine with variable power turbine nozzle and a three-speed automatic transmission for the conventional rear-wheel-drive. Williams Research conducted all the performance and fuel economy analyses, with the turbine-powered Concord meeting expectations. The final report estimated that the IGT vehicle would have a 10% higher cost over the conventional piston engine, of which less than half of the cost penalty would be in the turbine engine. The remainder would be the cost of adapting the existing production of vehicles and systems. However, fuel economy improvements, as well as reduced maintenance and repairs, would result in an overall life-cycle cost saving of 9% for the IGT vehicle.

== Solargen Electric ==
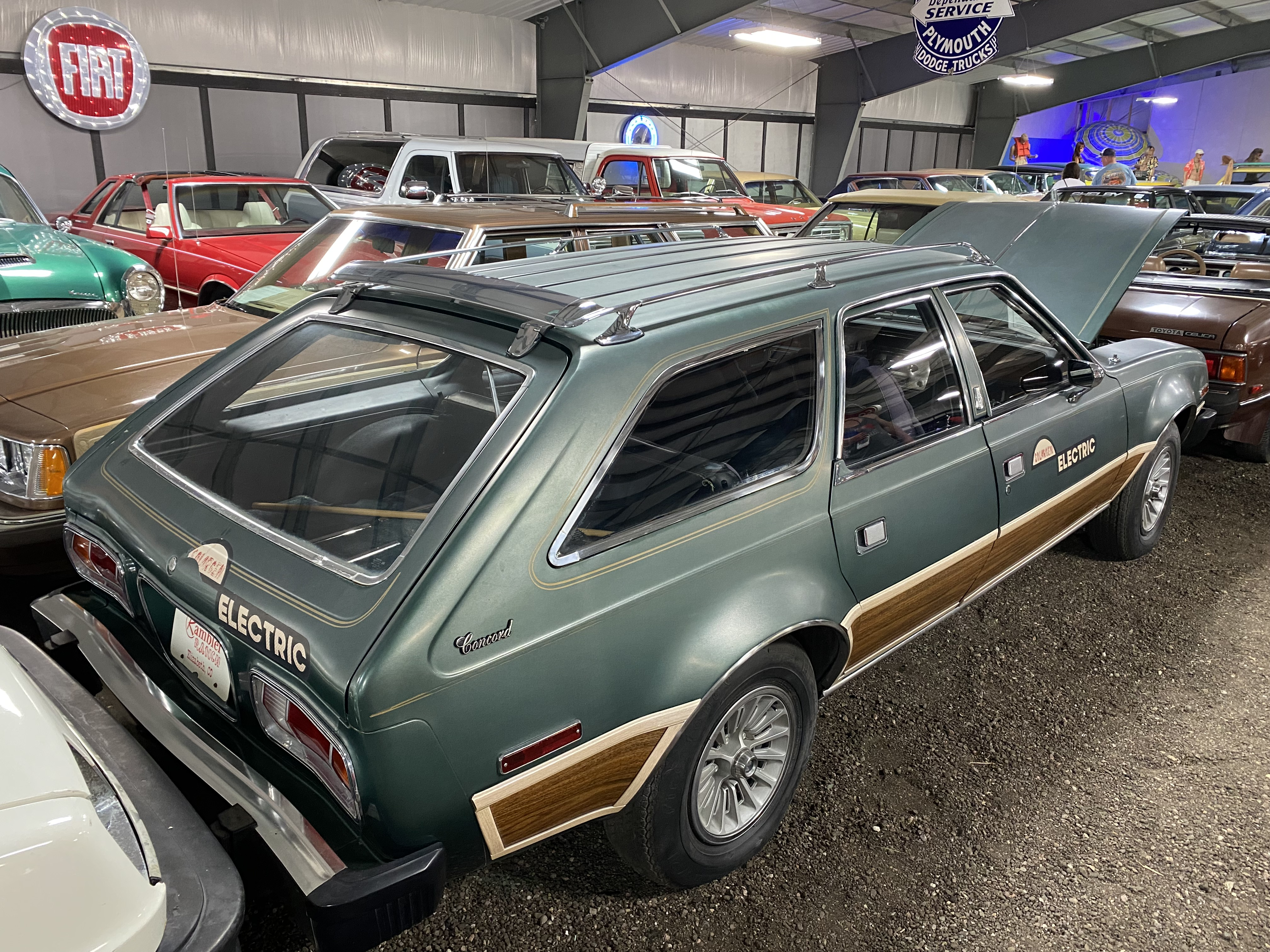
1979 Solargen Electric AMC Concord station wagon

=== Development ===
Solargen Electric Motor Car Company produced battery-powered plug-in Solargen Electric Motor Car Company produced component AMC Concords during 1979 and 1980. The idea was developed by Steven J. Romer, a lawyer from Manhattan, who secured a United States Department of Energy (DOE) grant to build electric cars in 1979. The company also received incentives and vacant buildings from the city of Cortland, New York. Romer's previous negotiations included a promised restart of heavy-duty diesel truck production in 1977, along with a line of Subaru-bodied electric cars, using the original Brockway Motor Company facilities in Cortland.

Solargen planned to purchase Concord station wagon gliders from AMC and install batteries and direct current electric motors. The cars were to use more robust and resilient rechargeable lead crystal batteries that Romer bought from its inventors. The objective was for the Solargen Electric to be like a regular compact passenger automobile, instead of the unusual designs of the other electric vehicles on the market. It was to be able to travel 60–65 miles (97–105 km) without a charge and to reach up to 90 miles per hour (145 km/h). The Solargen Electric was to be priced at $9,500, could be completely recharged with an extension cord on regular 110 house current in about six hours, or in half that time with 220-volts, while the future installation of 440-volt coin-operated recharging units in filling stations along roadways was claimed to provide recharging in minutes.

=== Production ===
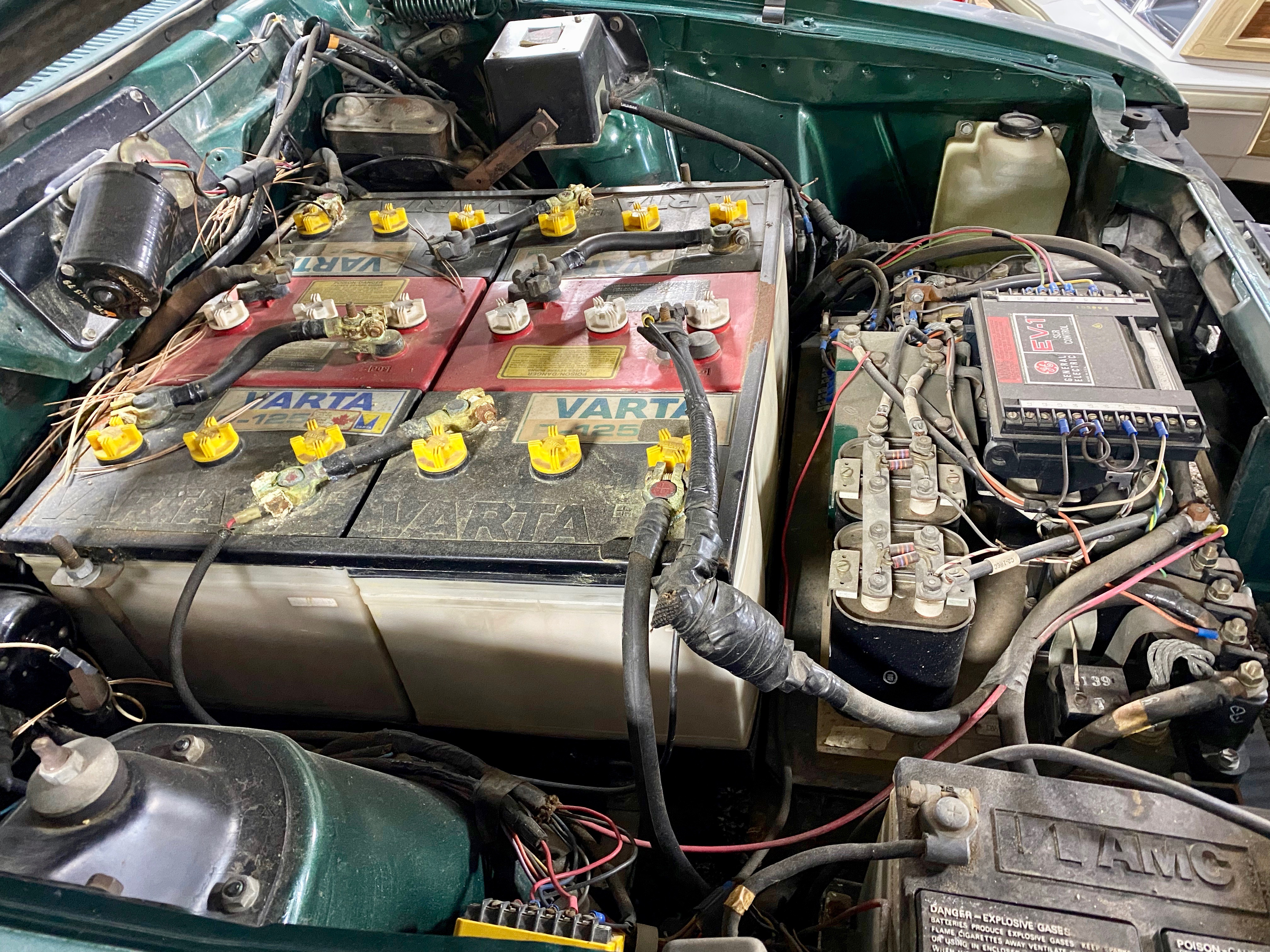
Battery pack and DC motor controller in Solargen Electric AMC Concord

Solargen began establishing dealerships, with thirty planned to be opened across the county by the end of October 1979. Problems were encountered with the advanced batteries, so the cars came with 20 regular lead-acid batteries underneath the hood and beneath the wagon's rear storage compartment. The Solargen provided a range of 30–32 miles (48–51 km) after a twelve-hour charge, and was not able to reach highway speeds. The battery cars were "remarkably silent,.. the only noticeable sound being an electrical 'whine' intentionally engineered into the design to warn pedestrians during acceleration of up to 18 mph." (29 km/h) The cars carried a price tag of about $17,000.

The Solargen's short production run of converted Concord station wagons was halted in late December 1979 due to delays in receiving a "major component", according to company officials. Subsequently, Solargen launched a $2.2 billion lawsuit against AMC claiming that the automaker conspired and reneged on a binding agreement to supply 3,000 Concords without a powertrain at $3,000 each and then not only raised the price to $4,593 per glider, but also delayed their delivery. The lawsuit also alleged that price increase and the delays were the results of pressure from General Motors "for the purpose of sabotaging Solargen's prospects of commercial success" and that AMC was in a conspiracy with GM in violation of the Sherman Antitrust Act.

=== Legacy ===
Continuing the enterprise's unusual deals and history, Romer is believed to have gone to Sierra Leone in 1991, along with $25 million from forty different clients. Romer was later convicted of defrauding $7 million from investors, as well as being handed a 22-year prison sentence. Some of the Solargen cars have been converted to run with regular AMC engines (including the "personal demo car of the owner of Solargen") and only a few of the original electric-powered Concord wagons still exist while some are not operational when they are sold.

== Concords in film ==
The 1978 film, The Betsy is a story about a family-owned automobile manufacturer and their hopes for a return to profitability on a new model. Actual 1978 Concords can be seen being completed and painted on AMC's assembly line in Kenosha, Wisconsin.

American Motors was a sponsor of the TV show Wonder Woman in later seasons, and as a result, AMC cars such as Wonder Woman's 1978 Concord AMX were used by the main character and also given extensive "face time" on the series.

== Epilogue ==
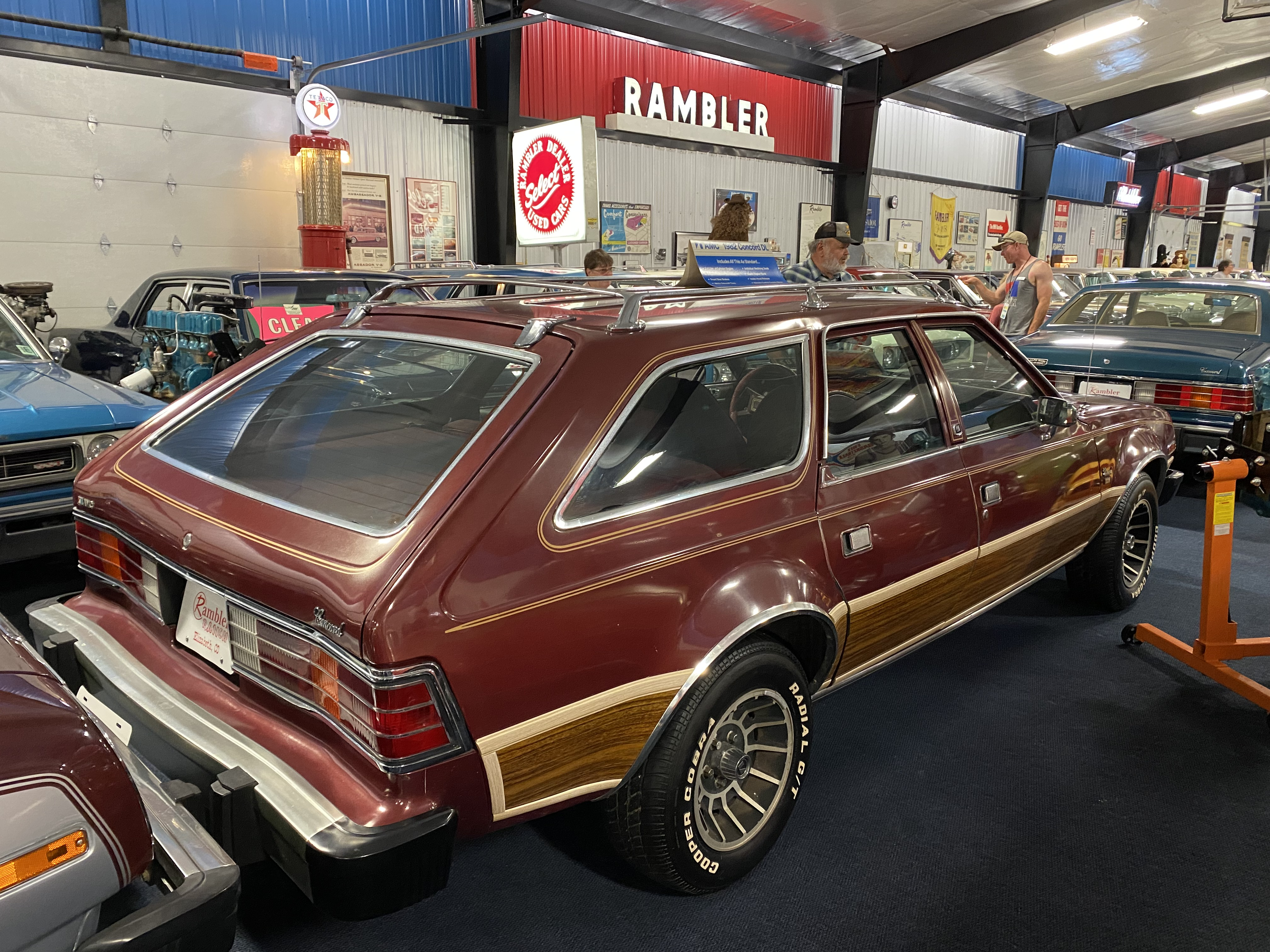
AMC Concord D/L station wagon

The Concord was "AMC's last best shot at trying to stay in the market with an American-designed car" until it was discontinued after 1983. After building over 406,000 Concords, AMC dropped the line, and made its successor the smaller front-wheel-drive Renault Alliance, a car that alienated many AMC loyalists.

The Concord was built on AMC's "junior" platform, which also served as the basis for the four-wheel-drive AMC Eagle, which according to author Don Sherman "pioneered the crossover SUV", and according to author Marty Padgett "predated a whole generation of crossover vehicles". The AMC Eagle remained in production until it was discontinued after Chrysler purchased AMC in the middle of the 1988 model year.

For the 1987 model year, AMC introduced the imported Medallion to replace the discontinued Concord and the similarly sized, but poor-selling Renault 18-based 18i/Sportwagon, which had been sold at AMC dealerships from 1981 until 1986. The Medallion, like its 18i/Sportwagon predecessors, also failed to sell in large numbers, and Chrysler canceled the captive imports at the end of 1989.

For the 1993 model year, Chrysler introduced the LH platform series of full-size sedans that was based on and built in the same Brampton, Ontario factory as the AMC-developed and Renault-derived Eagle Premier. Significantly larger than the AMC Concord, the flagship of the LH line for several years was similarly named, the Chrysler Concorde.
