= Bronco Buster =

Bronco Buster may refer to:

- Bronco buster (professional wrestling)
- Bronco Buster (film), 1952
- The Bronco Buster (1927 film)
- Bronco Buster (Denver, Colorado), a statue by sculptor Alex Phimister Proctor
- The Bronco Buster, a statue by sculptor Frederick Remington
- Bronco Buster (Funny Car)

== See also ==
- Bronc riding, a rodeo event
