= AMC Spirit =

Compact car produced by American Motors Corporation

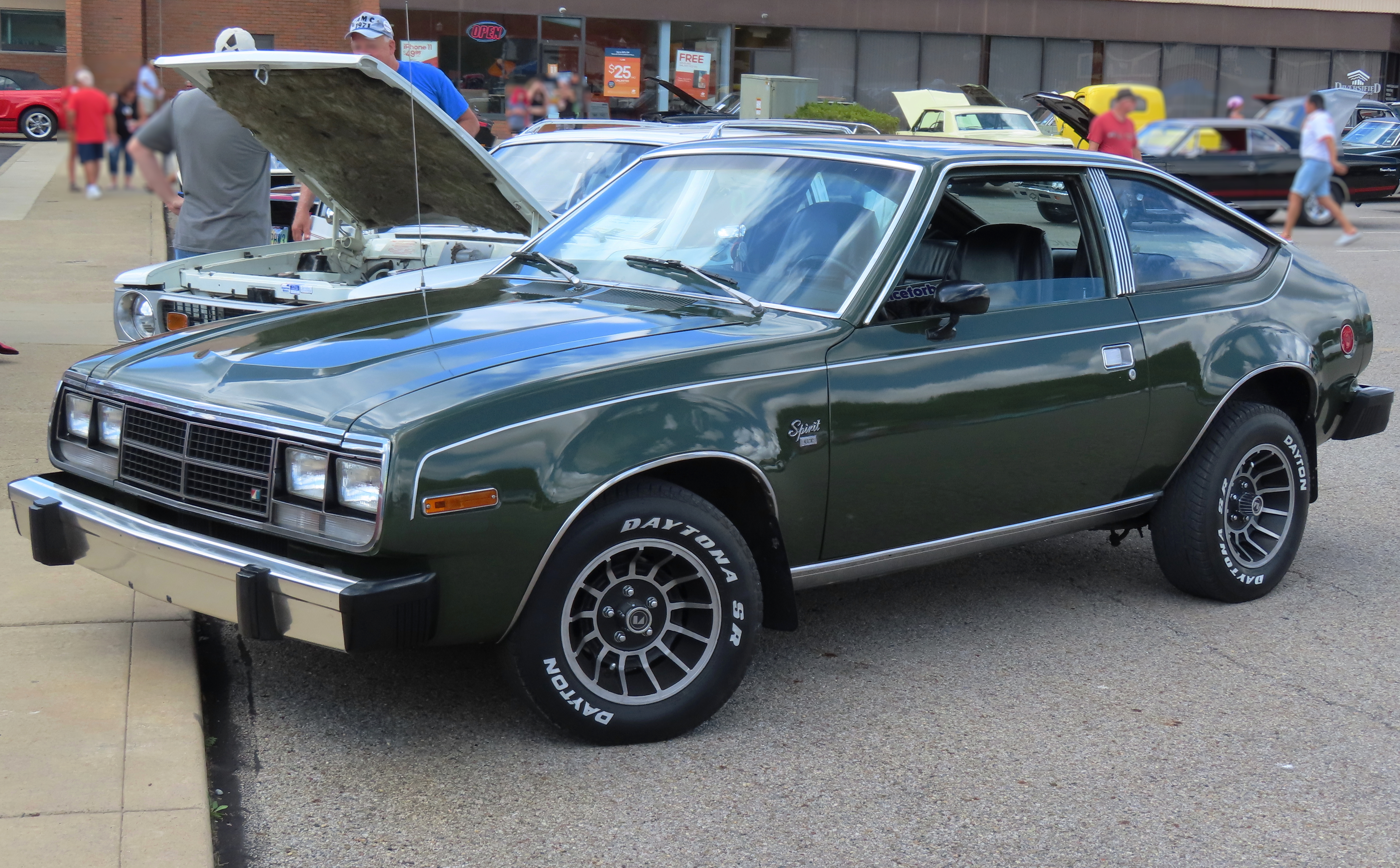
- 1981 AMC Spirit GT

Overview
- Manufacturer: American Motors Corporation (AMC)
- Also called: VAM Gremlin (Mexico, sedan); VAM Rally (Mexico, liftback)
- Production: 1978–1983
- Model years: 1979–1983
- Assembly: United States: Kenosha, Wisconsin (Kenosha Assembly); Canada: Brampton, Ontario (Brampton Assembly); Mexico: Mexico City (VAM )
- Designer: Dick Teague

Body and chassis
- Class: Subcompact
- Body style: 2-door sedan 3-door liftback
- Layout: FR layout
- Platform: AMC's "junior cars"
- Related: AMC Hornet; AMC Gremlin; AMC Concord; AMC Eagle

Powertrain
- Engine: 2.0 L VW EA827 I4; 2.5 L GM Iron Duke I4; 3.8 L AMC 232 I6; 4.2 L AMC 258 I6; 4.6 L AMC 282 I6 (Mexico); 5.0 L AMC 304 V8
- Transmission: 3-speed TorqueFlite automatic 4-speed manual 5-speed manual

Dimensions
- Wheelbase: 96 in (2,438 mm)
- Length: 167 in (4,242 mm)
- Width: 72 in (1,829 mm)
- Height: 51 in (1,295 mm)
- Curb weight: 2,521 lb (1,144 kg) base sedan

Chronology
- Predecessor: AMC Gremlin
- Successor: Renault Alliance/Encore; Renault Fuego (Spirit AMX)

The AMC Spirit is a subcompact car sold by American Motors Corporation (AMC) from 1979 through 1983. Replacing the AMC Gremlin, the Spirit was available in two different body styles; both were two-door hatchbacks – but neither was marketed as such. Instead, AMC offered a restyled Gremlin either as a "Spirit Kammback" or "sedan", while an additional model with a more gently sloping rear was introduced as the "Spirit Liftback" or "coupe".

Due to the automaker's budget constraints, the Spirit shared the Gremlin's platform – its floorpan, powertrains, and many other parts were carried over. American Motors also offered a four-wheel drive crossover version using the Spirit's bodywork, marketed from 1981 through the 1983 model year as the AMC Eagle SX/4 and Eagle Kammback (1981–1982 only). The cars were manufactured by AMC in Wisconsin and Ontario, and under license by Vehículos Automotores Mexicanos (VAM) in Mexico, where the restyled models retained the Gremlin name.

Performance versions of the AMC Spirit competed in road racing. In 1979, B.F. Goodrich sponsored a two-car team of Spirit AMXs in the Nürburgring 24 Hours. The AMXs were the first American team entries with a pair of hastily homologated cars. They finished first and second in their class out of a 120-car total field and were the only racers running street tires. Spirits were also privately campaigned in the International Motor Sports Association (IMSA) Champion Spark Plug Challenge and Racing Stock Class events, as well as in drag racing.

== Background ==
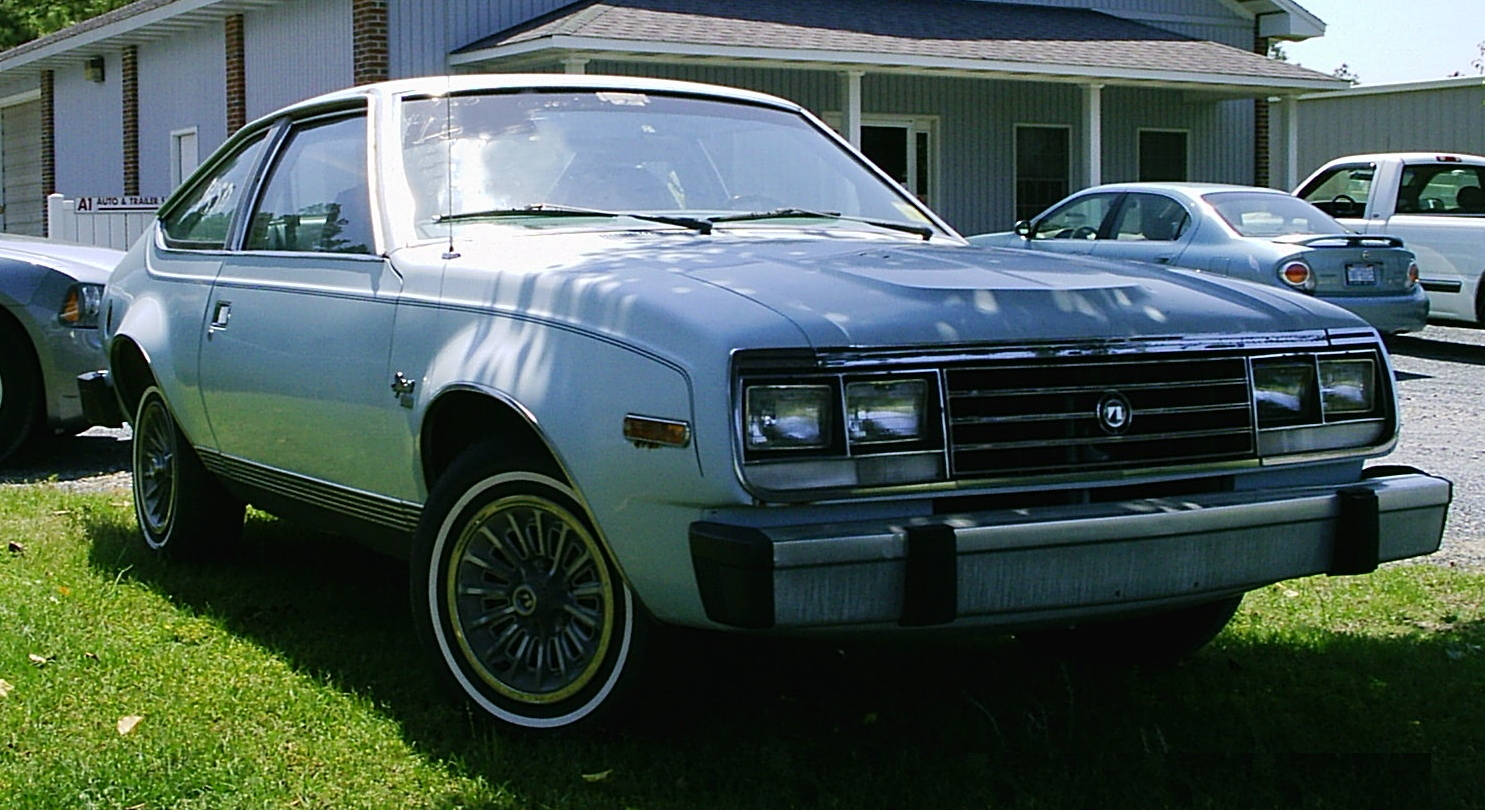
1979 Spirit DL liftback

The AMC Spirit was largely a restyled Gremlin, which had been manufactured from 1970 through 1978. Engineering and equipment upgrades introduced on the 1978 Concord carried over to the subcompact Spirit. The suspension system was revised with "soft-ride" mountings for the coil springs over A-arms in the front and the rear live-axle with leaf springs to improve ride and handling. Features included enhanced sound-deadening and corrosion protection as well as lightweight aluminum bumpers, lock-up automatic transmission converter, and higher-compression six-cylinder camshaft and pistons for economy, performance, and emissions.

The body received new styling and a liftback model was added to the previous two-door sedan. Dick Teague's "more-conventional" design of the new liftback coupe "had a particularly graceful superstructure for such a short car". A road test by Popular Science described the transition as AMC having the "cleverest engineers in Detroit," cementing their reputation of "getting $200 worth of looks for $100".

== Annual changes ==
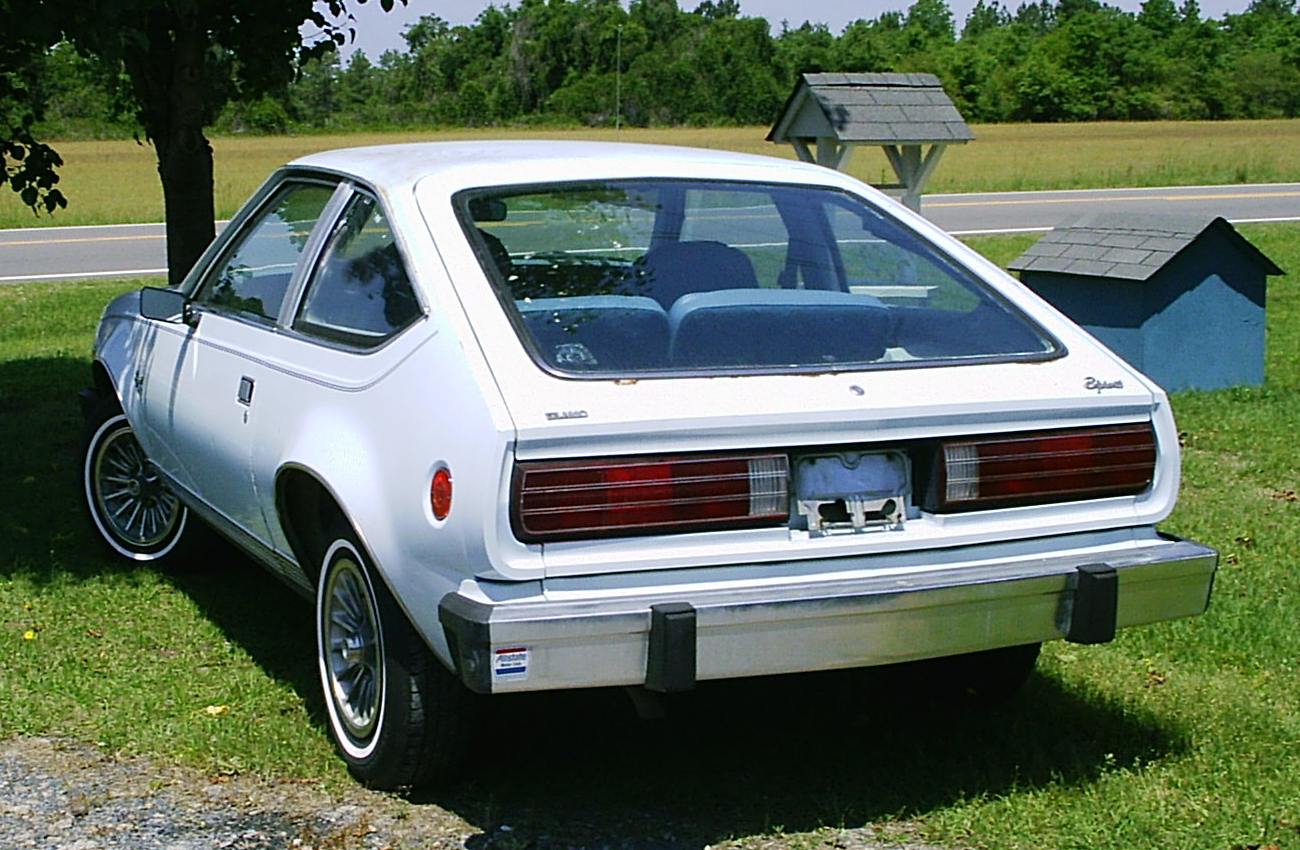
Rear view of the new liftback body design

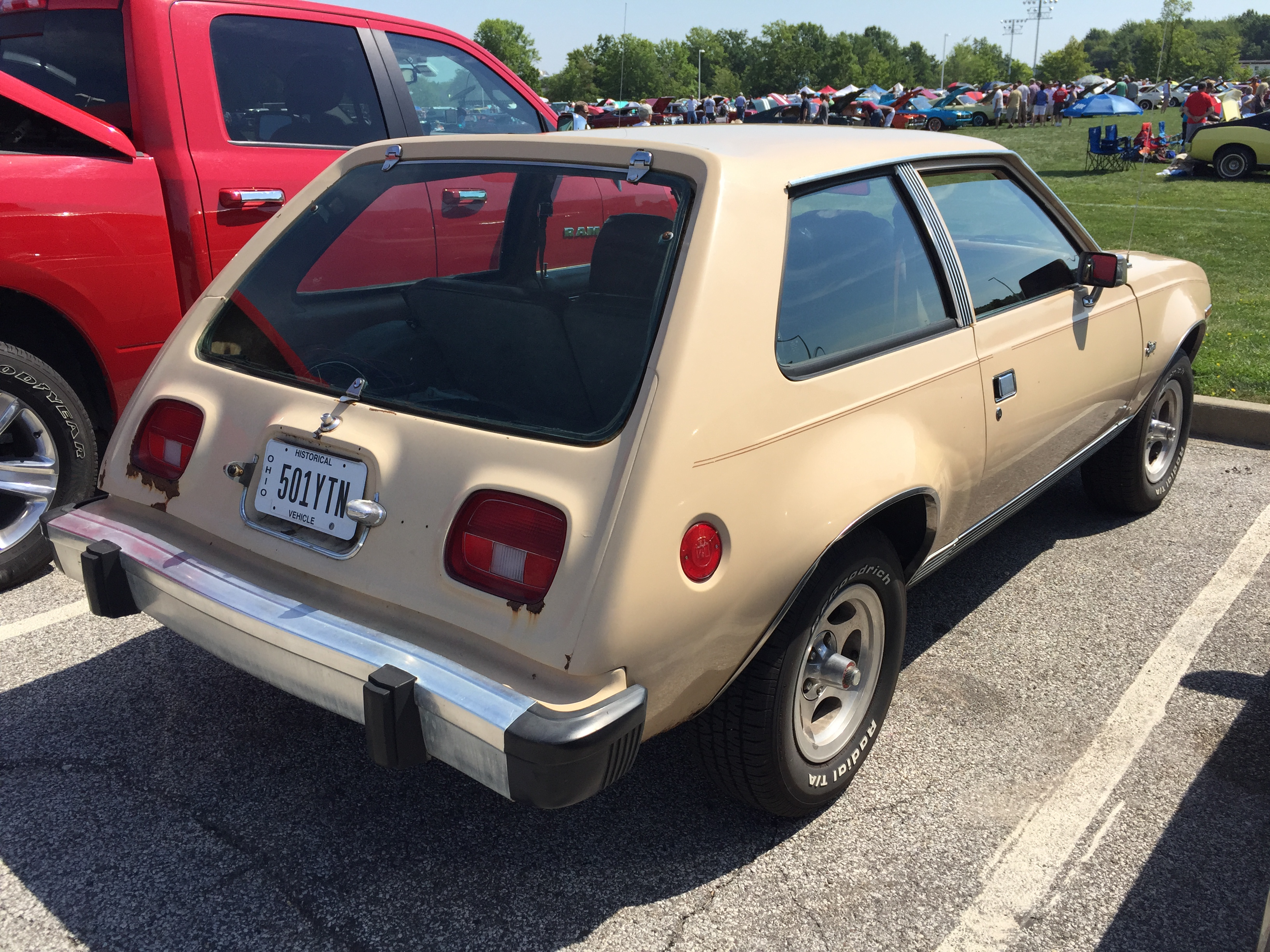
The sedan with large quarter window and opening rear glass

=== 1979 ===
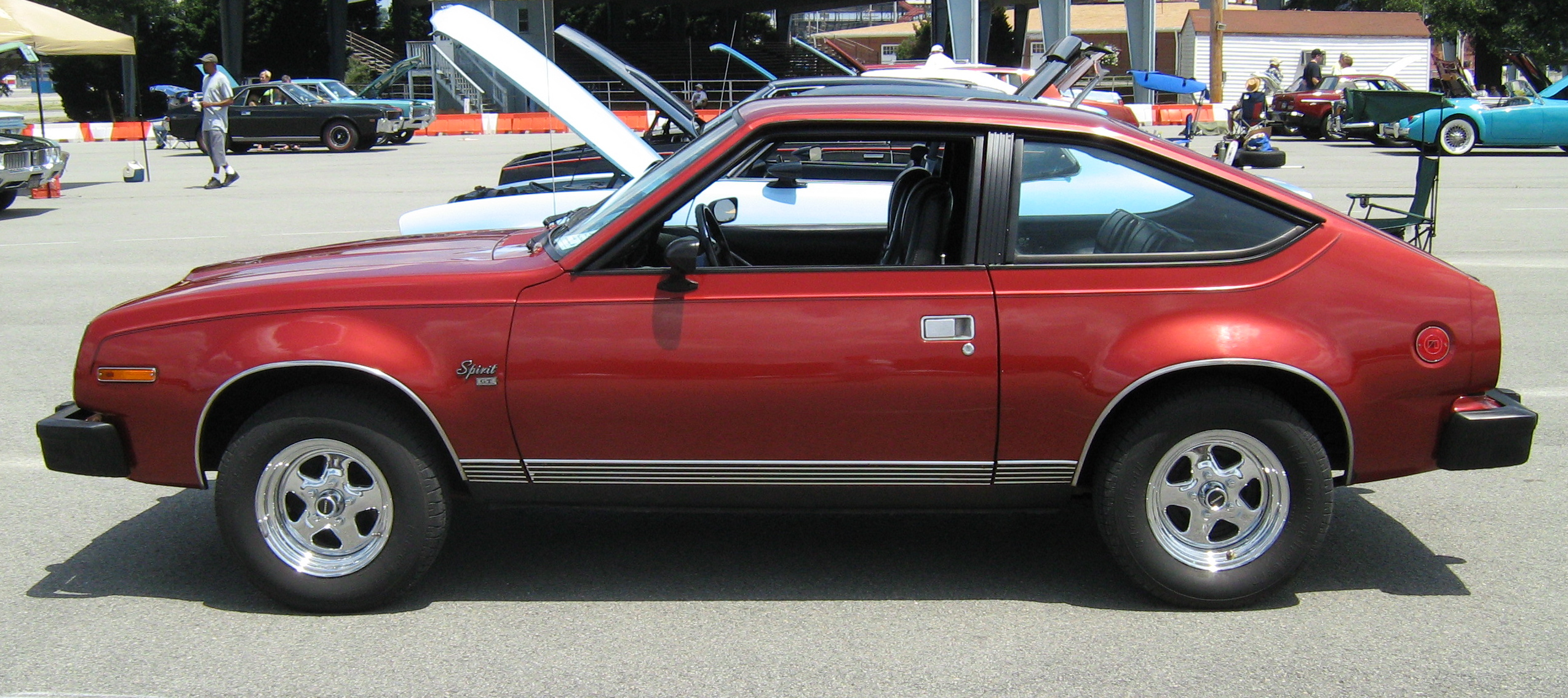
1979 AMC Spirit GT

As a restyled variant of the previous Gremlin, the Spirit featured distinctly larger rear quarter windows while retaining the instrument panel introduced on the 1978 Gremlin, with a wood grain overlay on DL and Limited models.

Riding on the same wheelbase as the sedan, the liftback was identical to the sedan from the doors forward and featured a sloping roof (compromising rear headroom) and a hatchback with a more shallow Kammback tail. The rear license plate hid the fuel filler cap. The Spirit offered a generous cruising range with its "fuel tank capacity of 21 gallons and probable fuel mileage of 25 mpg or more ... enabling the car's driver to travel over 500 miles between fill ups".

Standard equipment levels and convenience features were increased on the new Spirit compared to the Gremlin. For example, the DL models featured upgraded trim inside and out, including color-keyed wheel covers, custom bucket seats in corduroy fabric or "sport" vinyl upholstery, wood accents on the dashboard, steering wheel, and floor gearshift knob, and fluorescent-display digital clock. The top trim Limited model included leather seats and trim, air conditioning, AM/FM radio, an adjustable steering wheel, dual remote outside mirrors, a full-length center console with armrest, and many more features.

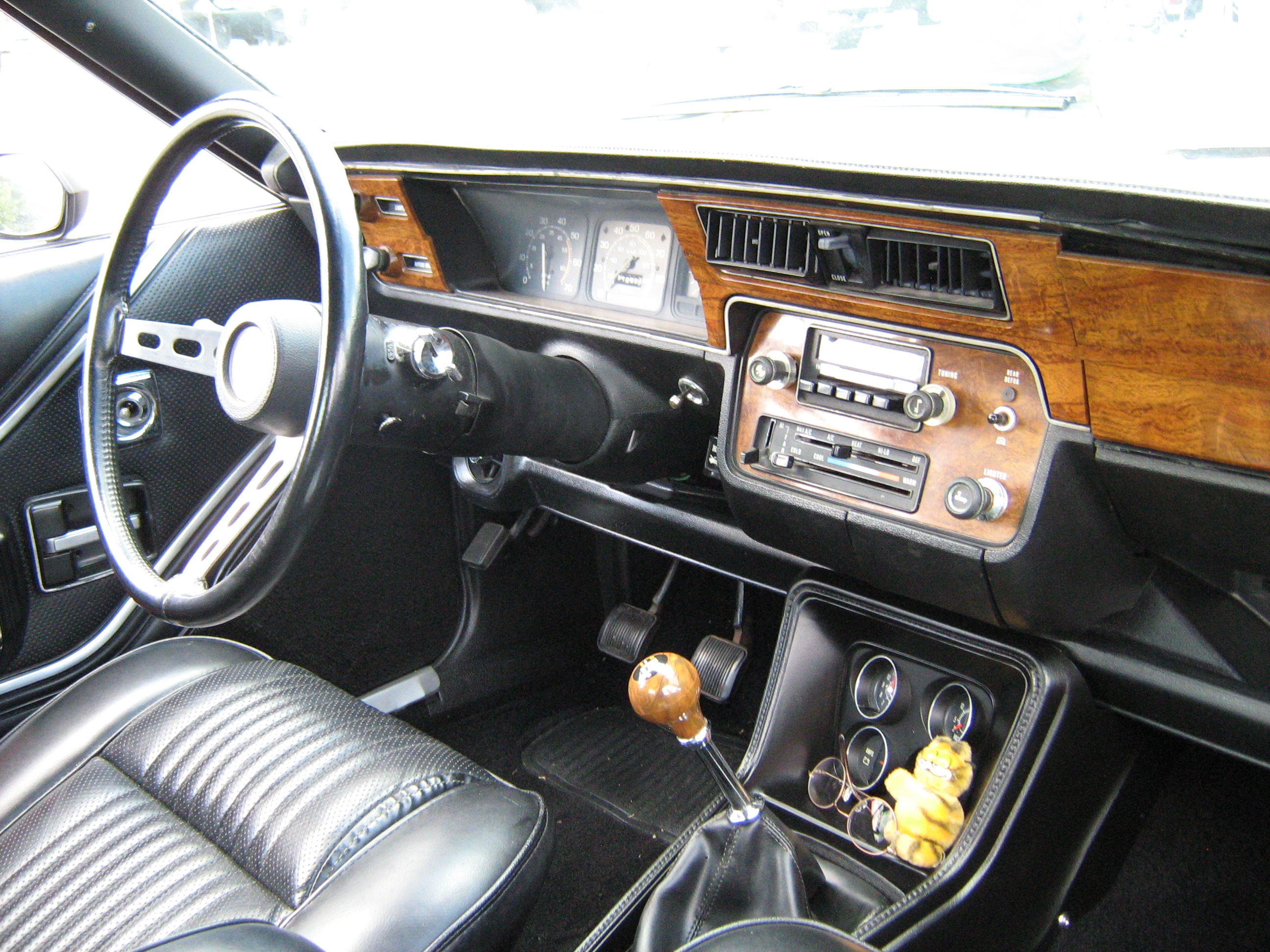
Standard interior with GT package included center console "Rallye" gauges

The GT package was available on the Spirit liftback and included among other features, blacked-out exterior trim, radial tires with styled wheels, black leather-wrapped sport steering wheel and console, tachometer, and "Rallye" gauges, as well as a special "deep-tone" exhaust system. The package also had a rear spoiler, and other sporty features that offered AMC to have a competitor in design, style, price, size, and performance to the new-for-1979 Fox-based Ford Mustang. A separate GT "rally-tuned" suspension option included tuned front and rear sway bars, "Hi-Control" rear leaf springs with "iso-clamp" pads, special strut rod bushings, adjustable Gabriel "Strider" shock absorbers, as well as heavy-duty brakes and quick ratio steering box.

The standard engine on all models except the AMX was a 121 cu in (2.0 L) EA831 inline-four supplied by Audi. Optional were AMC's 232 cu in (3.8 L) and 258 cu in (4.2 L) inline-sixes (the latter standard on the AMX). The 304 cu in (5.0 L) AMC V8 engine was offered as an option only on the liftback. The 1979 model year would mark a one-year reprieve for V8 availability in the short 96 in (2,438 mm) wheelbase AMC chassis. The last time this configuration was available was in the 1976 Gremlin. All engines could be mated to either a standard four-speed manual transmission or an optional three-speed TorqueFlite automatic transmission with floor shift, depending on trim and options. A three-speed manual transmission was available as a delete option with the 232 engine.

The four-cylinder engine is the same overhead camshaft unit carried over from the Gremlin, and was also available on the Concord. It used the same cast parts as the Porsche 924 (both made by VW/Audi), but was assembled in an AMC plant in Indiana to different specifications than that of the Porsche engine. The AMC version was only offered with a 2-barrel carburetor while the Porsche unit had electronic fuel injection and a higher compression ratio. It was available with either a 3-speed TorqueFlite automatic transmission with special gear ratios or a Borg-Warner HR1 4-speed manual.

The AMX model was transferred from the Concord hatchback to the Spirit liftback body for 1979 and came with either the 258 I6 or the 304 V8 engine. The AMX featured a flush blackout grille with an AMX emblem, fiberglass wheel flares, rear spoiler, ER60x14 white-letter tires on 14x7-inch "Turbocast II" aluminum wheels, blackout trim, "GT rally-tuned" suspension, floor shift transmission, an optional hood decal, and other sporty features.

Popular Science magazine compared the four-cylinder Spirit with the Chevrolet Chevette, Dodge Omni 024, and the imported Plymouth Champ describing the Spirit's "generous updating of the chassis and body have kept it fresh-looking." Despite its imported engine, with its heavy chassis it was "no economy standout ... what is special about the Spirit is the luxury finish ... with the look of a high-priced car." A Popular Mechanics survey of one-thousand owners after they had driven their cars a total of 795,733 miles (1,280,608 km) gave their Spirits "a strong vote of confidence as a basically fine automobile - good-looking, great handling, economical, smooth-riding, and quite comfortable for two people."

=== 1980 ===
1980 Spirit and AMX trim/striping/two-tone paint/molding availability

The 3.8 L I6 was dropped from the lineup, as was the 5.0 L V8 to meet the 20 mpg_{‑US} (12 L/100 km; 24 mpg_{‑imp}) average corporate fleet fuel economy standard for the 1980 model year. The VW-based I4 was replaced with a Pontiac-built 2.5-liter I4 that was "better suited to the cars' size and weight specs." The 4.2 L I6 remained most popular, and the only engine available in the AMX model. To comply with the 1980s' much tougher emissions, computer-controlled carburetors were designed for better economy and operation. No major exterior changes were seen, except on the AMX, as its grille emblem moved to the center.

All AMCs, including the Spirit, received a new rust-proofing process called Ziebart Factory Rust Protection. This included aluminized trim screws, plastic inner fender liners, galvanized steel in every exterior body panel, and a deep-dip (up to the window line) bath in epoxy-based primer. AMC backed up the rust protection program with a five-year "No Rust Thru" component to its comprehensive "Buyer Protection Plan".

=== 1981 ===
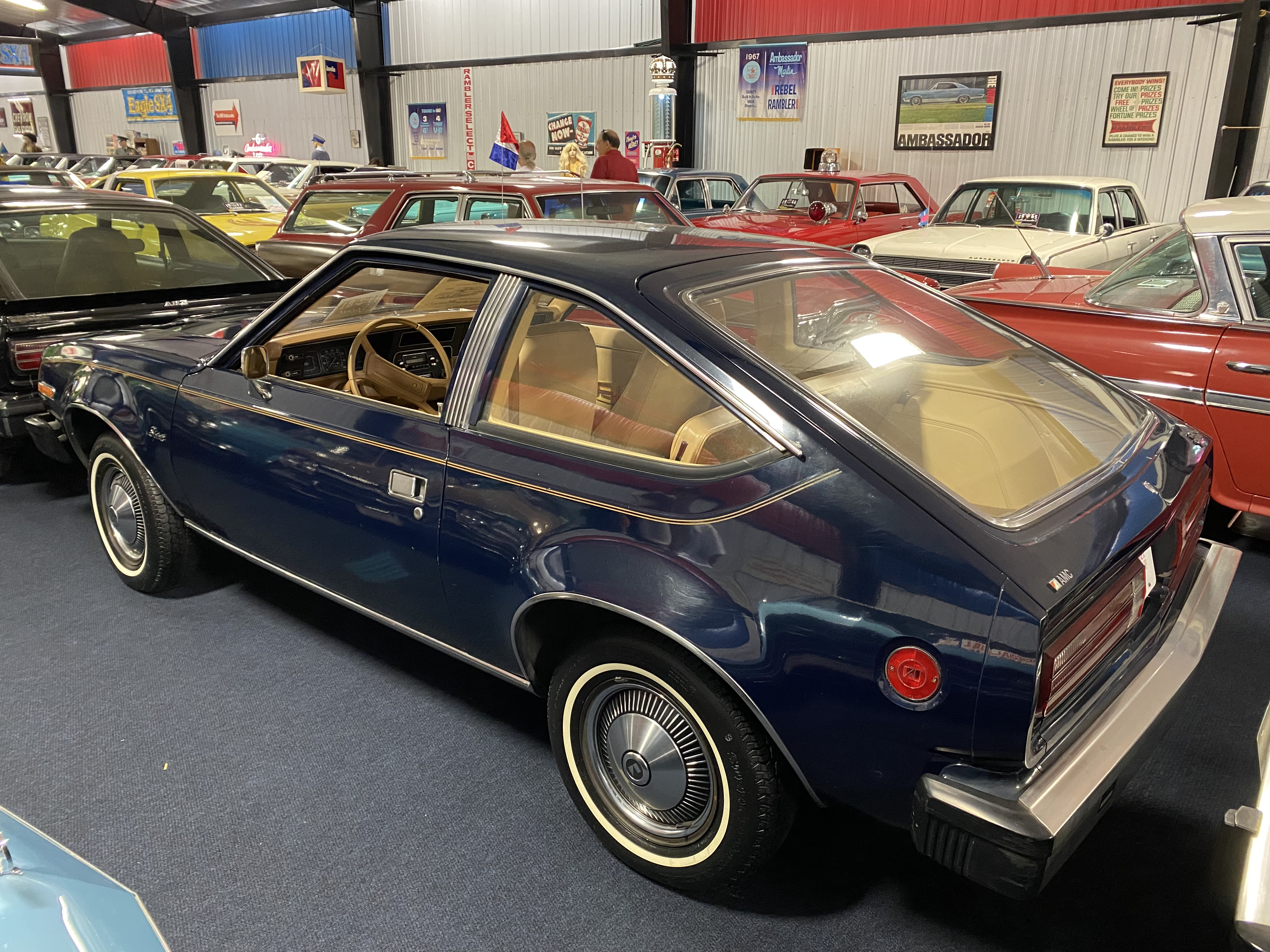
1981 AMC Spirit base model

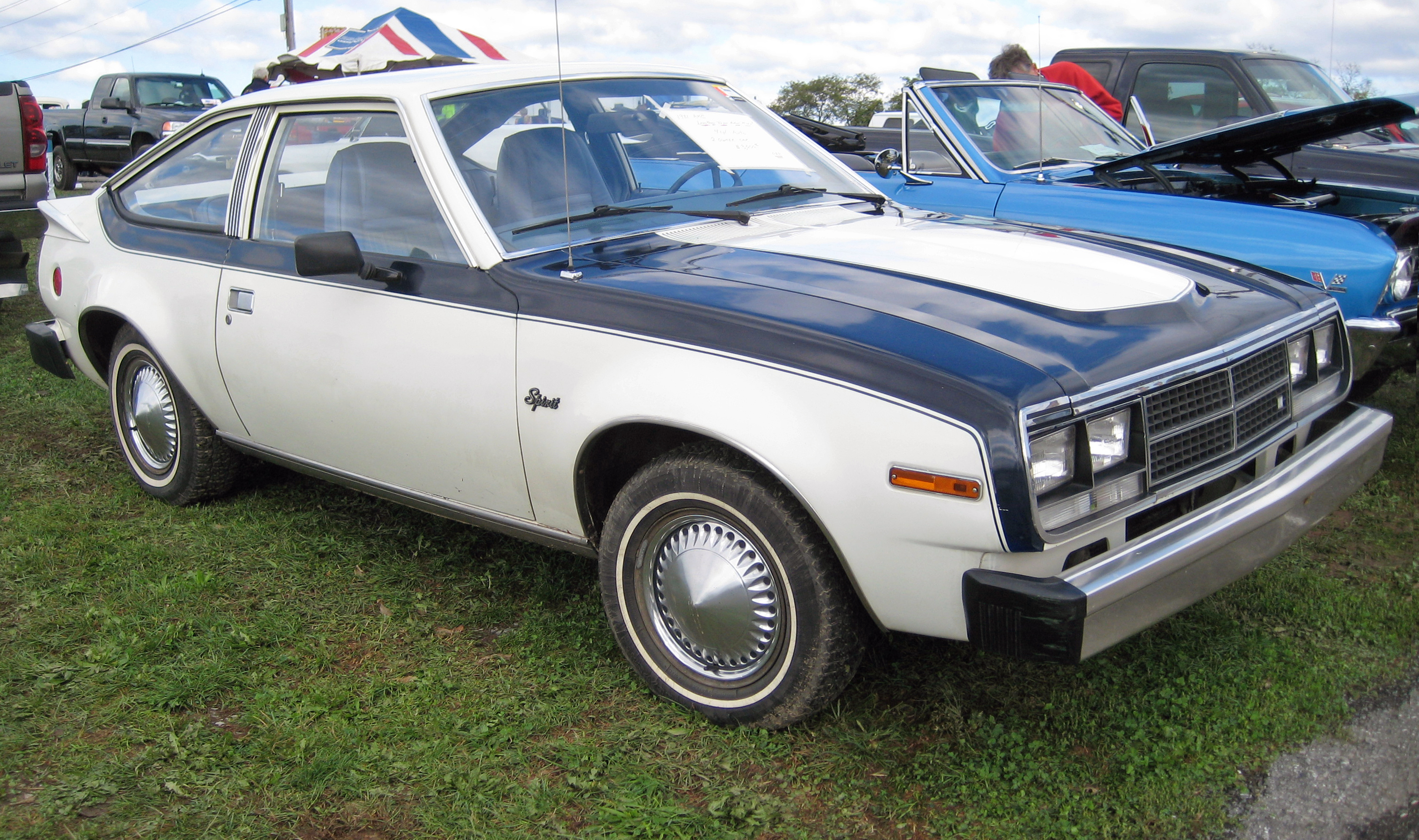
1981 AMC Spirit base model with optional two-tone and rear spoiler

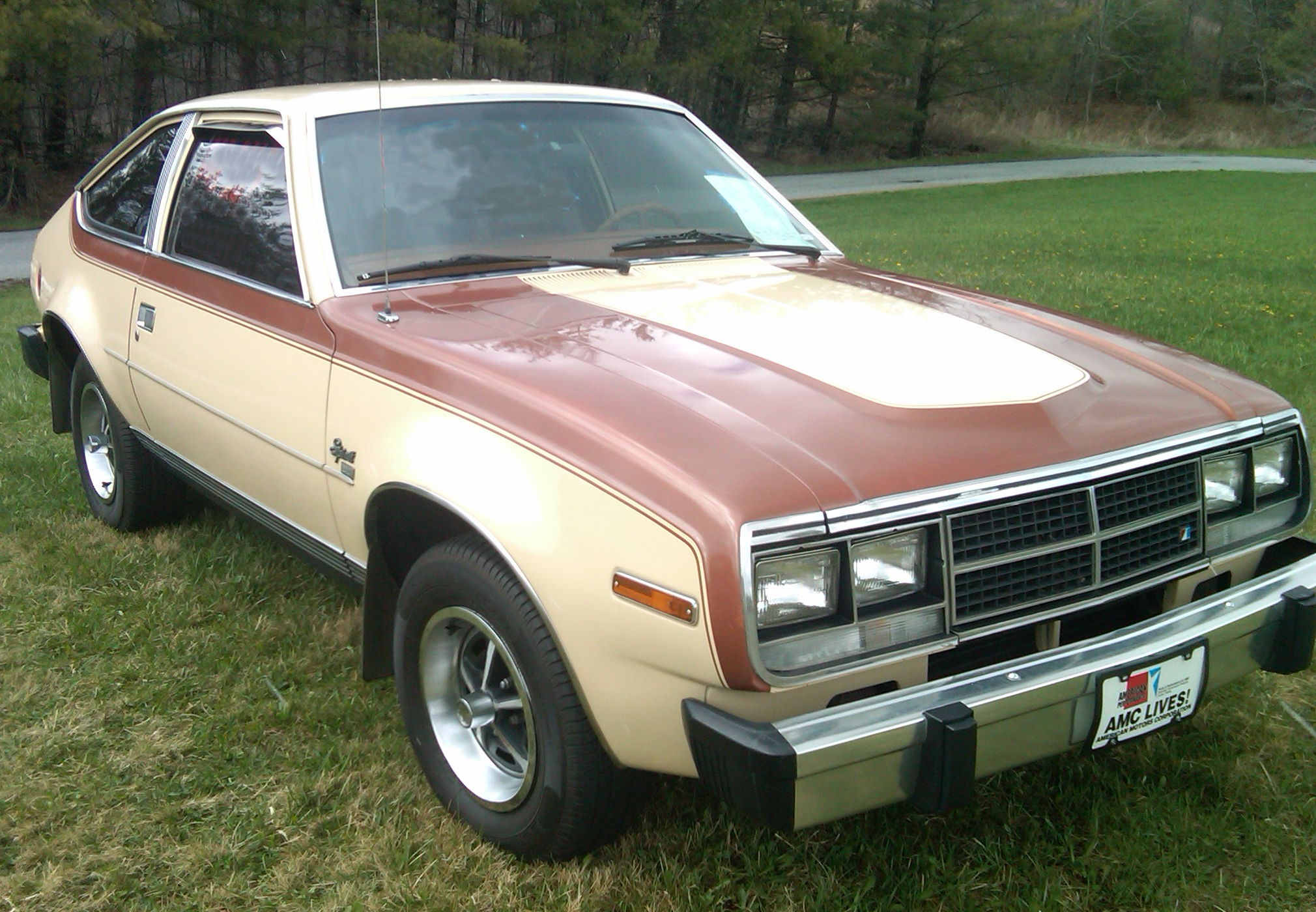
AMC Spirit DL with optional two-tone

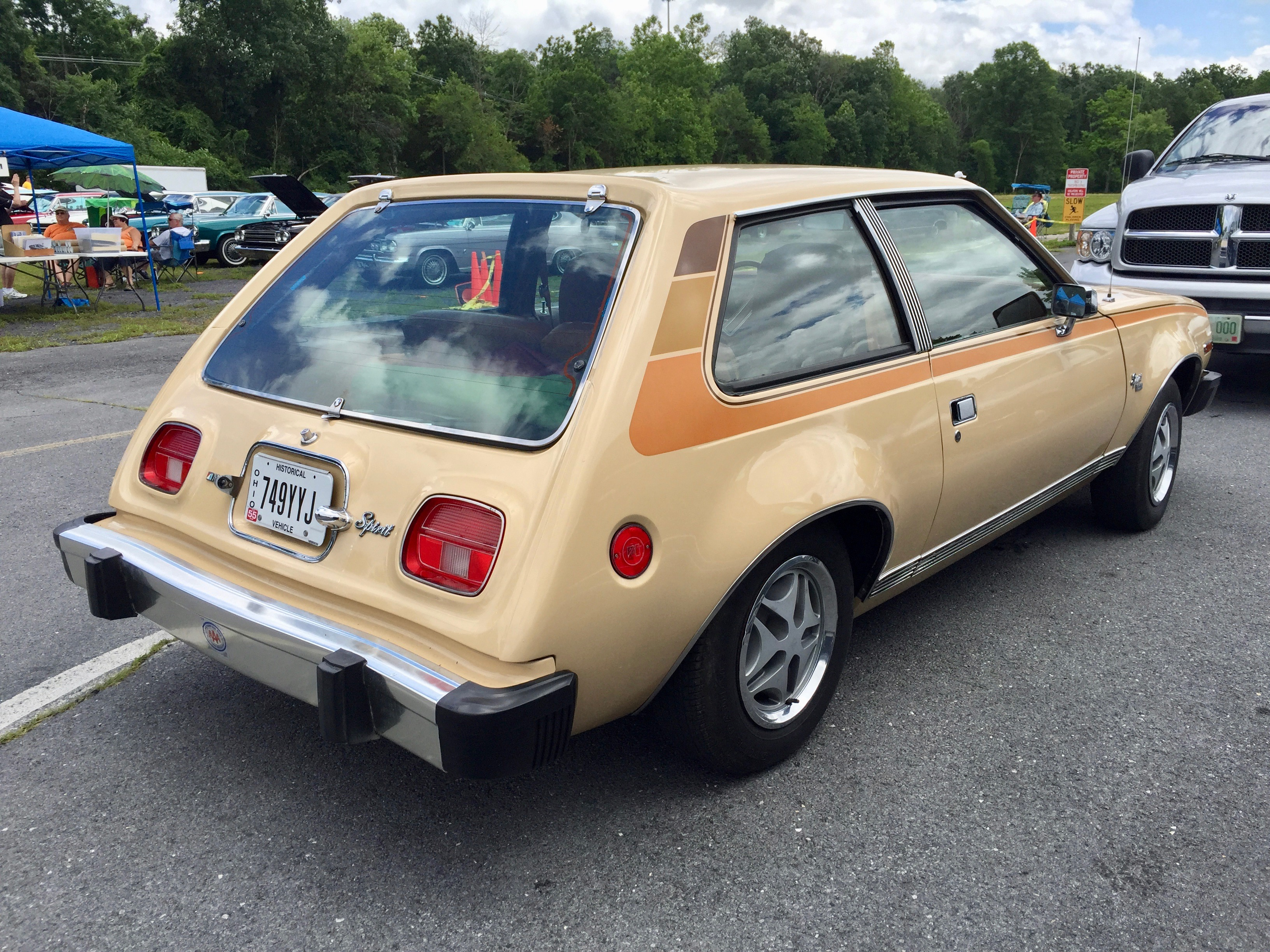
AMC Spirit sedan with optional stripes

The 1981 model year AMC Spirits received a new crosshatch grille with a single crosshair element. New optional "Noryl" wheel covers were added. The leather-clad Limited models were canceled, leaving the DL as the top-rung model. The AMX model was discontinued, but the liftback was available with the GT appearance package, available on both base and DL trims, with both engines. An optional G.T. rally-tuned suspension for the liftback included special front and rear sway bars, tuned strut rod bushings and rear spring iso-clamp pads, heavy-duty adjustable Gabriel Strider shock absorbers, "hi-control" rear leaf springs, and a faster steering box ratio. New options included power windows, rear window wiper and washer, power antenna, as well as tricolored "rally" stripes.

A four-speed manual transmission was standard while the optional three-speed automatic now included a lockup torque converter, and radial tires were standard fitment across the lineup.

The 258 cu in (4.2 L) I6 was redesigned and made 90 pounds (41 kg) lighter, as well as smoother, higher low-end torque, more economical, and requiring less maintenance. The numerous engineering improvements and the substitution of aluminum for iron and steel made the venerable AMC engine "the lightest in-line Six in the domestic industry", at 445 lb (202 kg).

The 1981 AMC EPA fuel economy figures for the 49 states were:

- 23 mpg_{‑US} (10 L/100 km; 28 mpg_{‑imp}) city and 33 mpg_{‑US} (7.1 L/100 km; 40 mpg_{‑imp}) highway for the 4-cylinder 4-speed
- 20 mpg_{‑US} (12 L/100 km; 24 mpg_{‑imp}) city and 26 mpg_{‑US} (9.0 L/100 km; 31 mpg_{‑imp}) highway for the 4-cylinder automatic
- 19 mpg_{‑US} (12 L/100 km; 23 mpg_{‑imp}) city and 28 mpg_{‑US} (8.4 L/100 km; 34 mpg_{‑imp}) highway for the 6-cylinder 4-speed
- 19 mpg_{‑US} (12 L/100 km; 23 mpg_{‑imp}) city and 26 mpg_{‑US} (9.0 L/100 km; 31 mpg_{‑imp}) highway for the 6-cylinder automatic

There were four kinds of wheel treatments this year that included the "Custom Wheel Cover" or standard full wheel discs, "Full Styled" wheel cover made of Noryl which was standard on the Spirit DL, the "Spoke Styled Wheels" which were standard on the Spirit G.T., and the "Turbocast II" aluminum wheels which were optional on all models. Fifteen exterior paint colors were available in 1981. They were Olympic White, Classic Black, Quick Silver Metallic, Steel Gray Metallic, Medium Blue Metallic, Moonlight Blue, Autumn Gold, Sherwood Green Metallic, Cameo Tan, Copper Brown Metallic, Medium Brown Metallic, Dark Brown Metallic, Oriental Red, Vintage Red Metallic, and Deep Maroon Metallic. Interiors were available in "Deluxe Grain" vinyl in black, blue, beige, and nutmeg. "Coventry Check" fabric was available in black, blue, beige, and nutmeg.

American Motors led the way in galvanized steel news for 1981, by applying one-sided and two-sided galvanized materials to all of the exterior body panels on all its models. AMC tied these applications into its warranty program and the Spirit was advertised as "One Tough American Economy car" highlighting its galvanized steel in every exterior body panel. According to Dale E. Dawkins, AMC's vice-president, "Every square inch of inner surface on exterior body panels is galvanized on our Spirit, Concord, and Eagle models." to support AMC's new "Tough Americans" marketing campaign highlighting the long warranty and rustproofing measures included in their cars.

For the 1981 model year, AMC introduced Eagle models (SX/4 liftback and Kammback sedan) based on both Spirit body styles.

=== 1982 ===
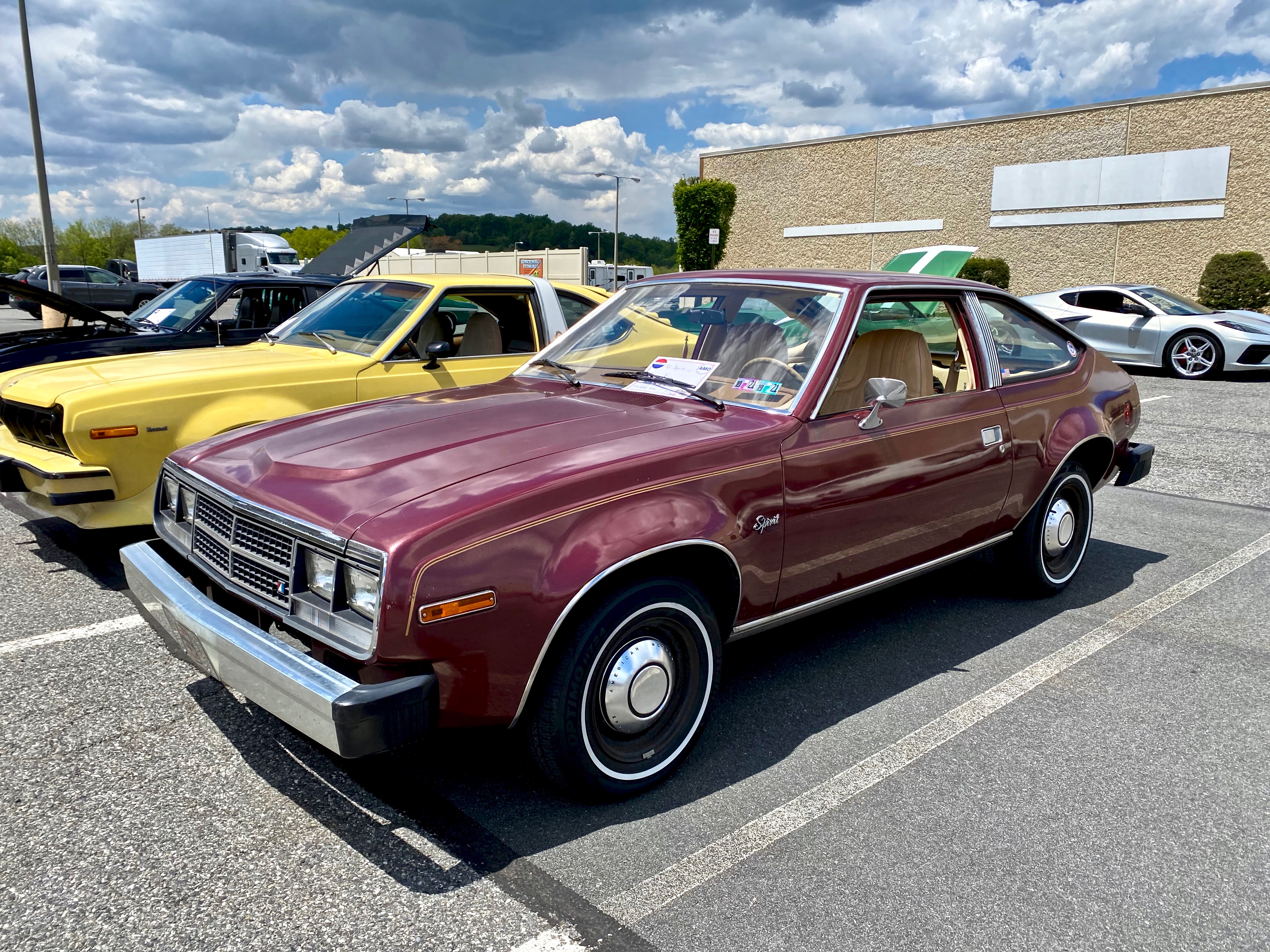
1982 AMC Spirit base model

Changes to the Spirit for 1982 were mostly mechanical. A new 5-speed manual transmission was offered as an option, thus the "Spirit GT became America's first pony car available with a 5-speed gearbox." New low-drag front disc brakes were standard. Together, they allowed the 2.5 L Spirit to achieve 37 mpg_{‑US} (6.4 L/100 km; 44 mpg_{‑imp}) on the highway, according to the 1982 EPA estimates. For automatic transmission-equipped cars, the Chrysler sourced three-speed TorqueFlite ratios were more widely spaced to afford better mileage.

American Motors Company promoted the 1982 Spirit in an unusual television ad campaign. Trying to differentiate their cars from the competition, and to make a point that the "Tough Americans" come with Ziebart rustproofing and a five-year rust warranty, the ads showed a new Spirit dropped into 30 feet (9 m) of saltwater.

=== 1983 ===
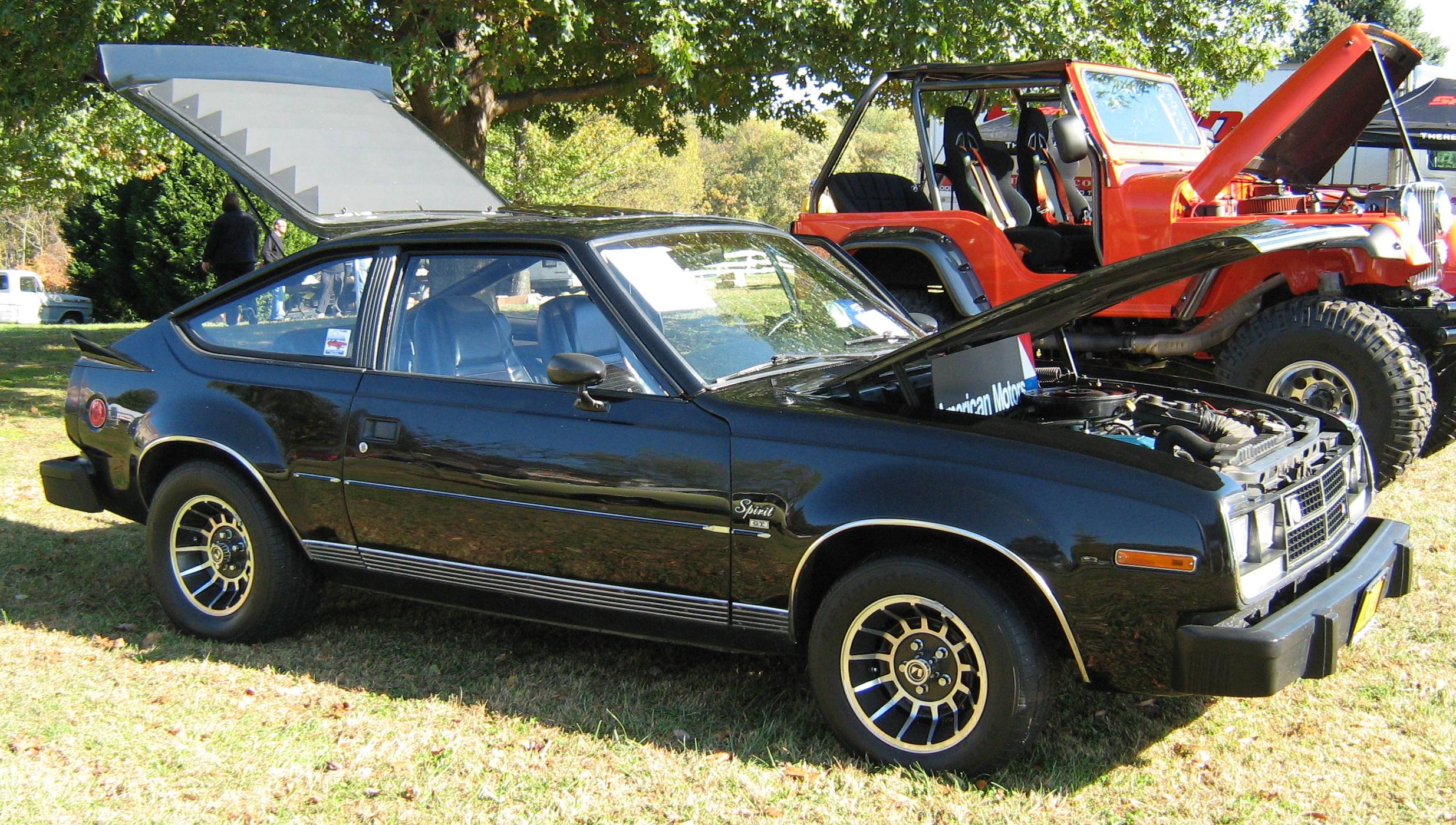
1983 Spirit GT

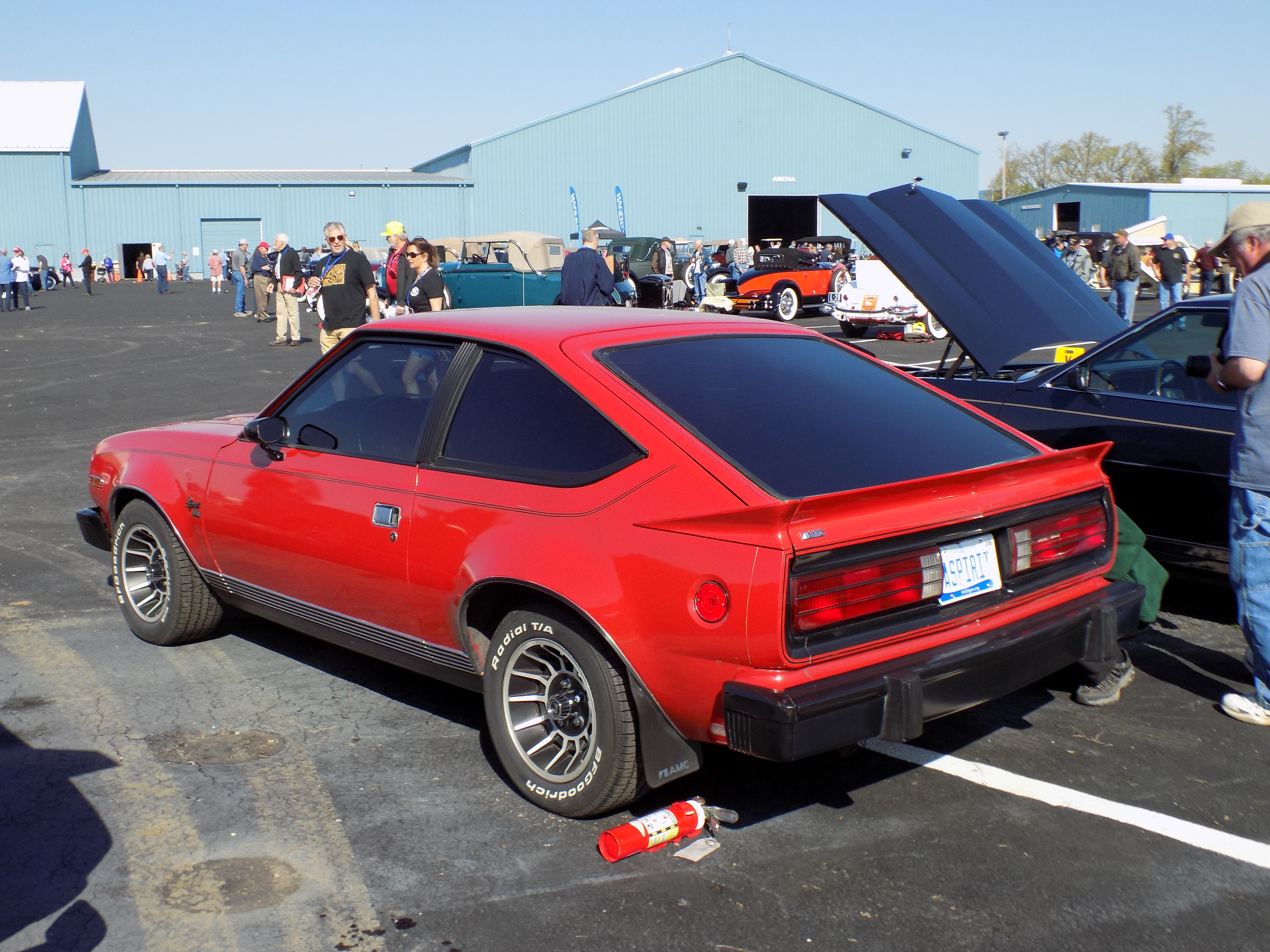
1983 Spirit GT

The Spirit sedan was deleted from the line in 1983, along with the 2.5 L I4 and the base model liftback. All 1983 Spirits were 4.2 L-equipped liftbacks in either DL or new GT trim. The Spirit GT's performance was described as "neck-snapping quickness" compared to the competing sporty cars with 4-cylinder engines.

The GT package became its own model separate from the DL for the Spirit's last year. Advertisements stressed the higher level of standard equipment in both Spirit DL and Spirit GT, which sold for US$5,995 and US$6,495, respectively. The Spirit GT version was compared to the liftback version of Ford's Mustang.

For the 1983 model year, AMC introduced the new Renault Alliance, which was a much more modern, space-efficient, fuel-efficient, front-wheel-drive subcompact car than the rear-drive Spirit, with its 14-year-old platform. The Spirit was canceled as AMC released the Alliance-based Encore hatchbacks for 1984. In addition, the front-wheel drive Renault Fuego, "a nicely executed sports coupe," was also sold by AMC dealers as an alternative to the Spirit GT. The Fuego had distinctive styling, four-passenger room, fuel economy (U.S. EPA rated at 39 mpg_{‑US} (6.0 L/100 km; 47 mpg_{‑imp}) on the highway), and it received good reviews in the automotive media.

== Production Figures ==
Model year	AMC Spirit production
1979	52,714
1980	71,032
1981	44,599
1982	20,182
1983	3,491
Grand total	192,018

== Spirit AMX ==
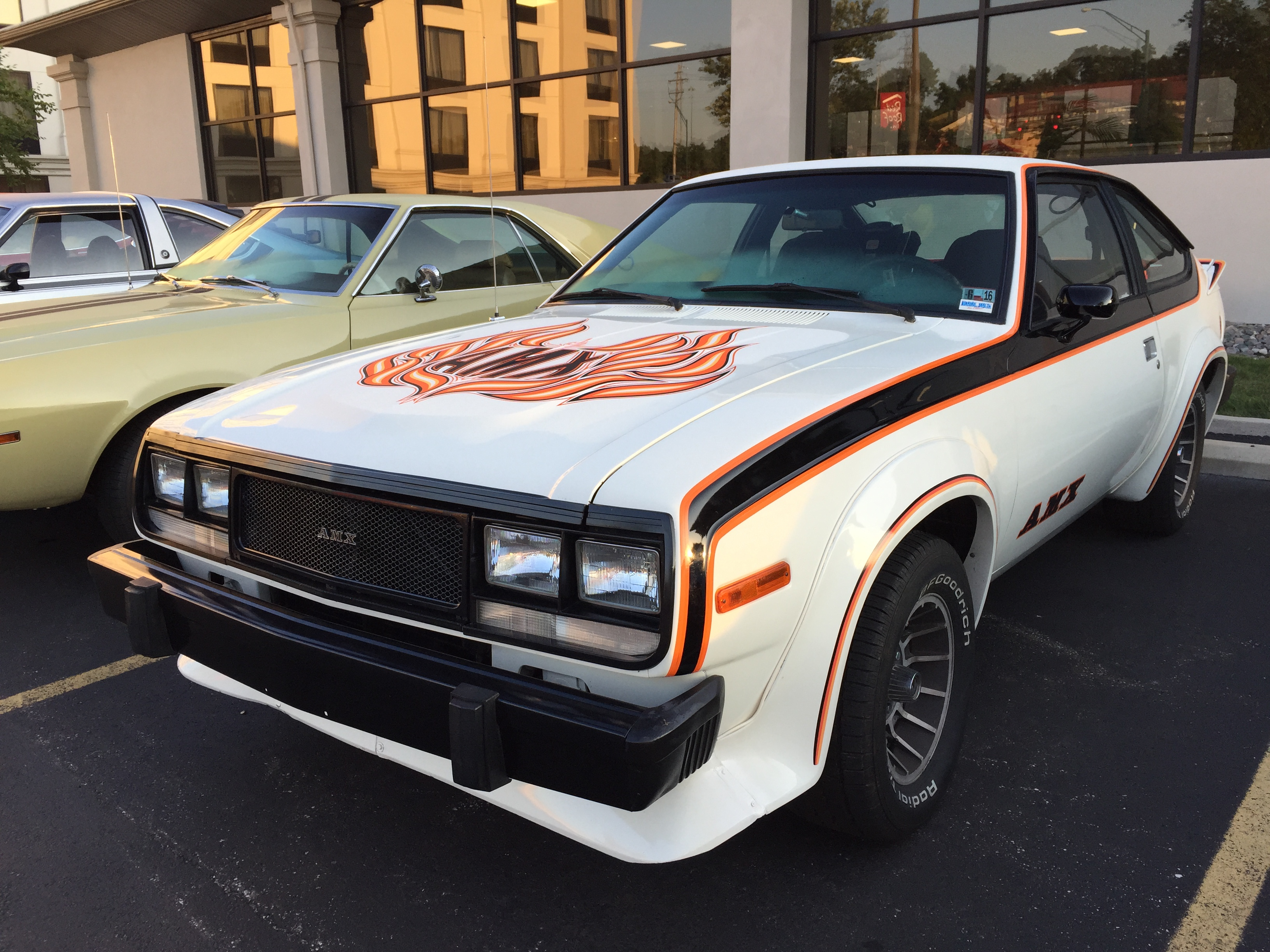
1979 AMX with standard striping

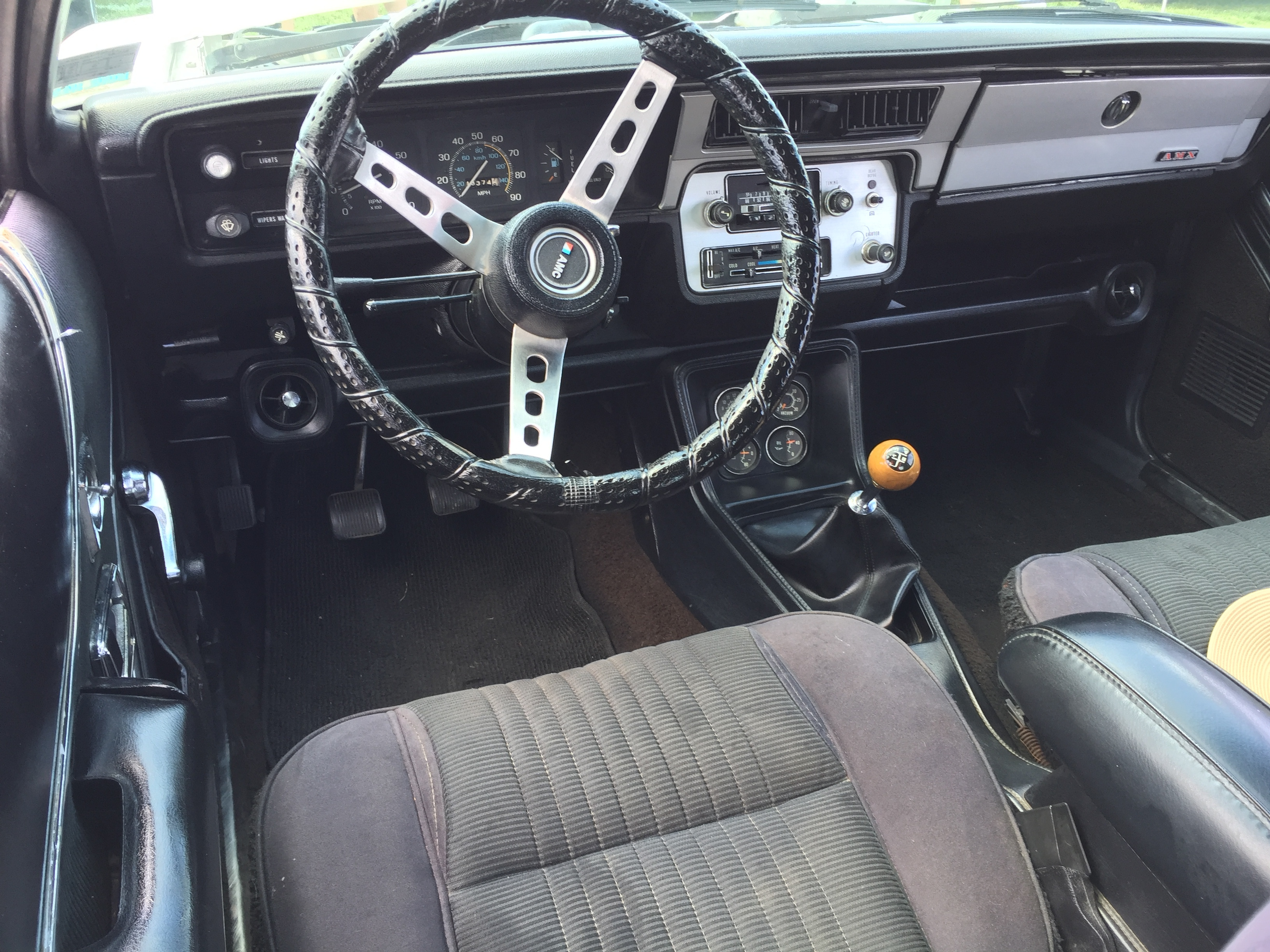
1979 AMX interior with standard 4-speed

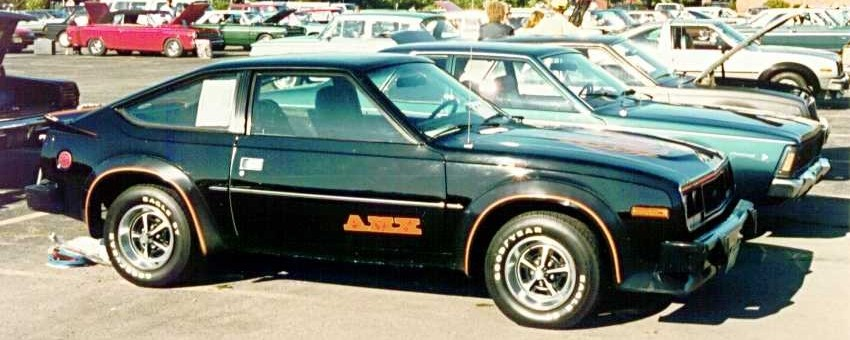
1980 AMX finished in Classic Black

An AMX version of the Spirit liftback was offered for 1979 and 1980 as a way of invoking the memory of the original two-seat 1968 through 1970 AMX.

Spirit AMX model featured special body color-matched fender flares and front air dam, "Rally-Tuned" suspension with 1.06 in (27 mm) front and 0.75 in (19 mm) rear sway bars, high-effort power steering gears, front and rear three-way adjustable "Strider" Gabriel (brand name) shock absorbers, heavy-duty semi-metallic 10.8 in (274 mm) front disk brakes with ribbed 10x1.2-inch (254x30.5 mm) rear drum brakes, unique AMX grille, "Turbocast II" 14x7-inch aluminum road wheels with ER60x14 Goodyear "Flexten" GT radial RWL (raised white letter) tires, rear spoiler, special striping package, hood and door decals, console shifted automatic or manual transmission with "Rallye Gauge" package (total of eight dials including an intake-manifold vacuum gauge), as well as simulated aluminum dash overlays with AMX badge on the glove compartment door.

Changes in the standard AMX equipment for 1980 were exclusively flat-finished black flares and air dam, standard 14x6-inch "Magnum 500" styled road wheels with the wider aluminum wheels now made optional, and deletion of the simulated aluminum dash overlays. Although the car "wasn't actually fast, it sure looked the part" with an "aggressive appearance." The quick-ratio power steering, large-diameter front and rear sway bars, as well as racing-tuned shock absorbers, provided excellent handling."

The biggest powerplant on the 1979 AMX was AMC's 304 cu in (5.0 L) V8 and it was the last AMC passenger car to have a factory-installed V8 engine. With the required emission devices and lowered compression ratios, the car felt adequately powered and could still deliver highway fuel economy ratings of about 20 mpg_{‑US} (12 L/100 km; 24 mpg_{‑imp}). Motor Trend described the AMX's performance as not bad for the day. Given the "emissions-choked" two-barrel Motorcraft carburetor, a three-speed automatic transmission, and "freeway-friendly" rear differential gearing, the AMX reached a top speed of slightly more than 100 miles per hour (160 km/h), going 0 to 60 mph in 10.6 seconds, and the quarter-mile dragstrip in 17.6 seconds. The 304 V8 equipped AMXs came with "sport-tuned exhaust" that made a noticeably different gurgle sound in contrast to the regular stock quiet muffler. For 1980, the V8 option was dropped making the 258 cu in (4.2 L) I6 engine standard with only a 2.53 rear axle ratio with either the standard floor shifter fiur-speed manual or three-speed automatic transmissions.

The Spirit AMX was an innovative concept and was well executed from an engineering standpoint, highlighting the creative thinking and skilled engineering on a low budget that characterized AMC's efforts." The Spirit line was markedly improved and performed well, but AMC was unable to overcome the perception that its products were outdated. Moreover, the Spirit AMX was introduced the same year as the similar but new Fox Platform Ford Mustang.

The Spirit AMX was discontinued after the two model years and replaced with the similar Eagle SX/4, a sporty four-wheel-drive successor. This model was the last car to wear the AMX name and has achieved popularity with AMC enthusiasts. Some owners modify the cars since it is easy to install a larger displacement AMC engine.

=== AMXs at the Nürburgring ===
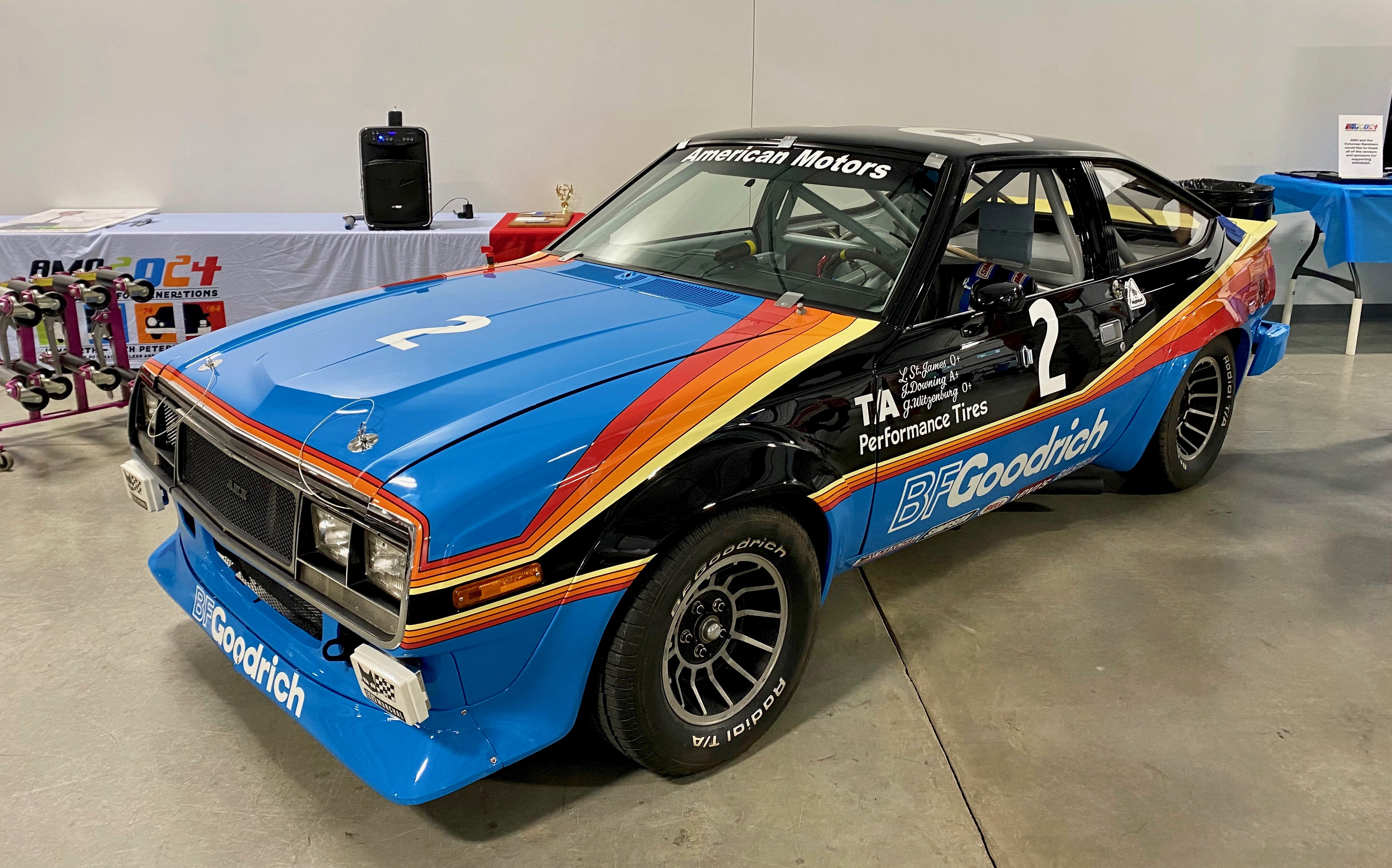
24-hour Nürburgring race car

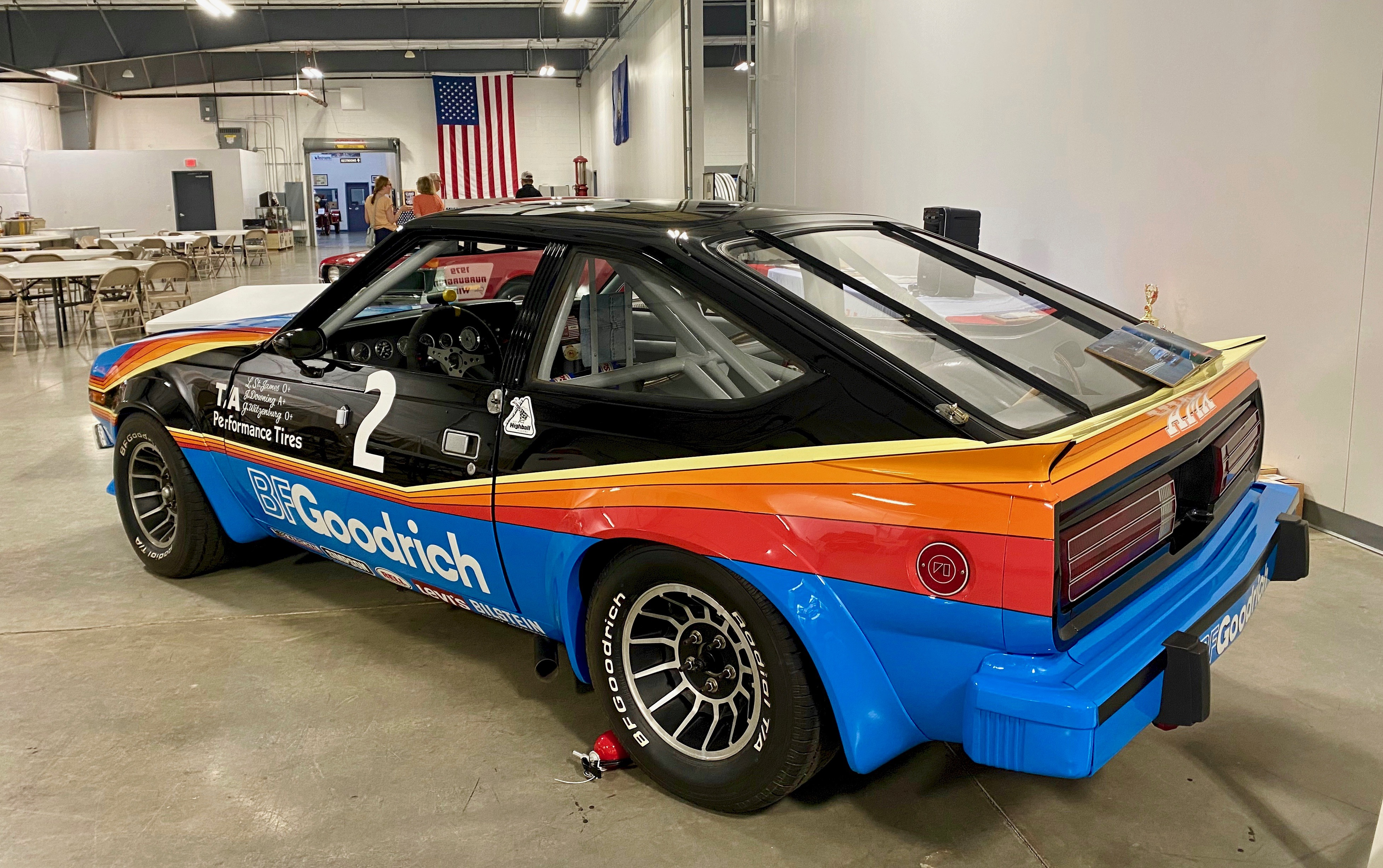
The #2 car at 2024 AMO show

In October 1979, the B.F. Goodrich sponsored a pair of AMXs in the annual FIA Group One 24-hour race held at Germany's legendary Nürburgring. The 1979 304 cu in (5.0 L) V8-powered Spirit AMX was already homologated for European Group One Touring Car races.

The cars were the first-ever American entries in this grueling race. They would compete against smaller-engined, but more agile competitors from BMW, Ford, Opel, VW, Renault, and Audi.

Drivers Amos Johnson and his partner Dennis Shaw were the team principals in the North Carolina–based "Team Highball." Supporting drivers were factory Mazda driver Jim Downing (who would later co-develop the HANS device), actor James Brolin, Lyn St. James, and automotive journalist Gary Witzenburg. Two street-stock cars (both with AMC 304 cu in (4.98 L) and four-speed manual transmissions) were supplied to "Team Highball" for Group One race modifications less than three weeks before a transport ship would sail to Europe.

With almost no prior driving time on the racecourse, and with the race practice cut short by fog, the team qualified the cars in 20th and 21st overall. The #1 Johnson/Shaw/Brolin car was given the faster set-up, with the objective of winning the race.

In the race, the #1 car suffered broken front shock absorbers and a slipping clutch, and the engine burned oil. Witzenburg reported the brakes and both front shocks "all but gone" in #2 – pumping the brakes dragged the front spoiler, but had little effect on speed. Moreover, since the AMXs were "rather crude" compared with the smaller, lighter cars they were racing against, they lost time in the turns. Nevertheless, Witzenburg said the cars "ran great," especially on the straights where they reached about 140 mph (230 km/h).

After driving almost 2,000 miles (3,219 km), they finished first and second in class, 25th and 43rd overall out of a field of 120. They were also the fastest entrants using street tires - BFG T/A radials, and had no tire failures.

The preparation of the cars and the team's experience of the race itself were covered by a period documentary film, The Ultimate Challenge.

The #1 AMX Nürburgring race car "served as a showcar for a few months after the race, then went into storage for about 25 years" and has only about 4,000 miles (6,400 km) on its odometer. The #2 race car returned to the racing circuit for several years, but has been located and reunited with the original drivers after over 25 years.

=== IMSA racing ===
AMC Spirits also campaigned in International Motor Sports Association (IMSA) Champion Spark Plug Challenge and Racing Stock Class events. With only limited support from AMC, mainly with some technical help, AMC Spirits were prepared by "Team Highball" and driven by Amos Johnson and Dennis Shaw.

Several AMC Spirits were entered in the 1979 World Challenge for Endurance Drivers. A Spirit was driven by Joe Varde and Dave Cowart in the 6 Hours of Talladega finishing the race in third place (an AMC Concord finished first, an AMC Gremlin was second, and an AMC Pacer was fourth) out of starting field of 49 cars. Five other AMC Spirits were also racing on 1 April 1979. On 1 June 1979, an AMC Spirit driven by Dennis Shaw and Don Whittington won the 6-Hour Champion Spark Plug Challenge at the Daytona International Speedway covering 151 laps and a distance of 933.162 km (579.840 mi) averaging 155.101 km/h (96.375 mph). AMC Spirits also finished in 5, 6, 11, 29, 37, and 42 places out of a total 62 starting cars.

The 1980 World Challenge for Endurance Drivers began with an AMC Spirit driven by Keith Swope and Mauricio DeNarvaez finishing in fourth place at Daytona's 6-Hour Champion Spark Plug Challenge on 29 June 1980. Eleven other Spirits placed out of the 72 cars that started in the race. A team consisting of Lou Statzer, Amos Johnson, and Dennis Shaw ran a Spirit AMX 84 laps in the GTX class at the 28th Annual Coca-Cola 12 Hours of Sebring on 22 March 1980.

=== Turbo pace car ===
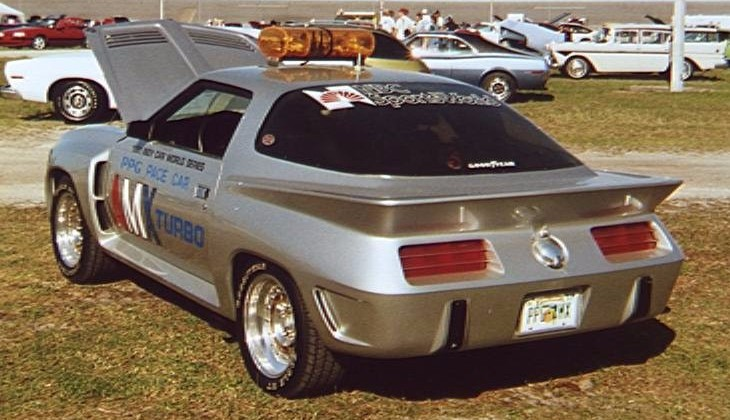
1981 AMX Turbo PPG pace car

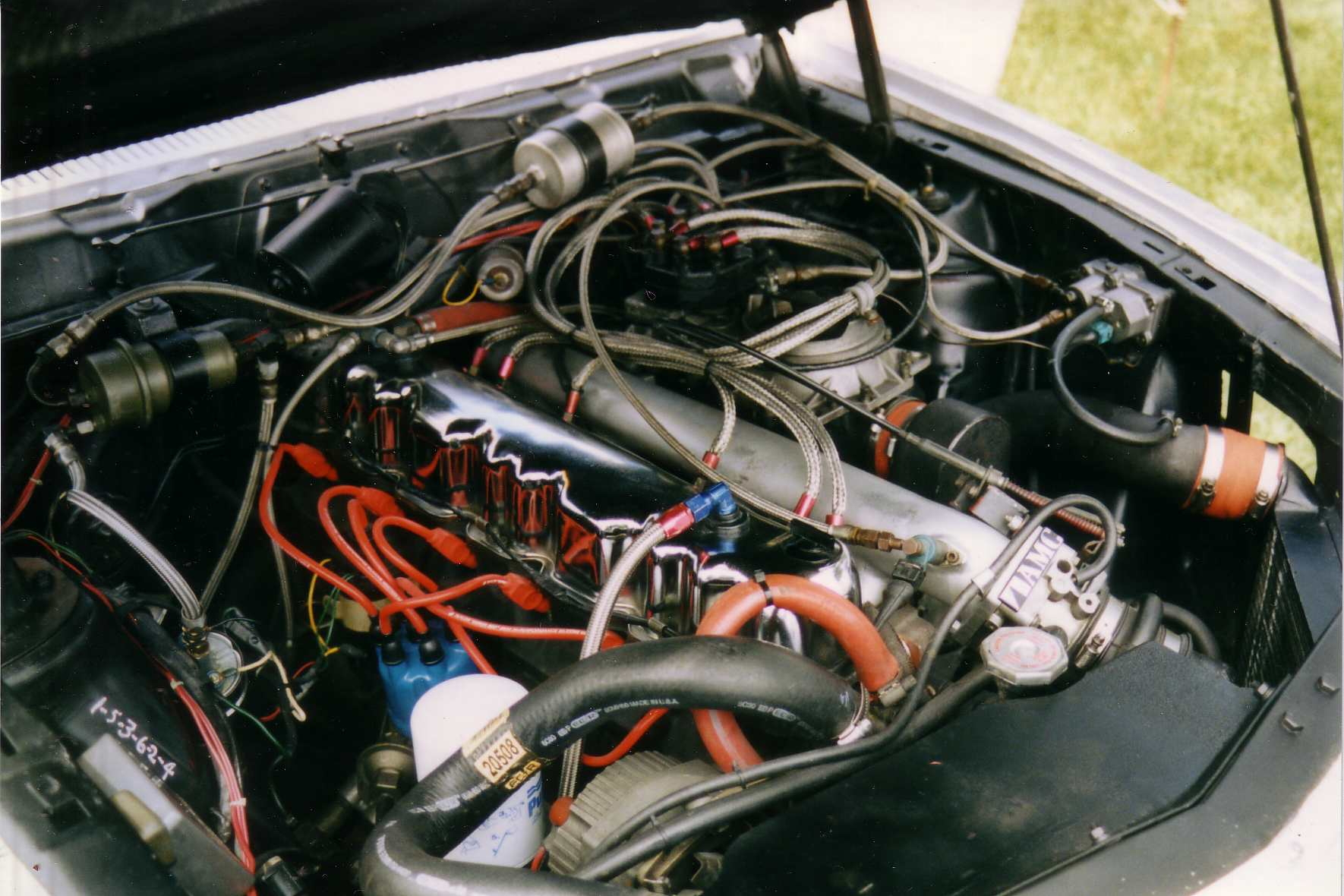
Turbo-charged and fuel-injected AMC I6

Two AMC AMX Pace cars were prepared to serve as four official safety cars each year in Championship Auto Racing Teams (CART) for the 1980 and 1981 auto-racing seasons. The objective was to create one pace car for each of the four major American car companies based on the existing production models of that time.

Both used the Spirit liftback body with the first one shown by PPG Industries featuring a white/red/blue/black painted production 1979 Spirit AMX with covered headlamps and integrated and smoothed front bumper and air dam unit. The current status of this car is unknown.

The 1981 car was a highly modified fastback constructed by Autodynamics of Troy, Michigan under contract from PPG Industries. Designed by Dick Teague, AMC's Vice President of Automotive Design, the body has a more aerodynamic efficient, fiberglass shell with smooth bumpers. A unique ram air induction system was designed into the rear quarter panel while the rear featured an integrated spoiler with a high center fuel fill. The interior was modified to include new front racing bucket seats along with a special roll bar and cage.

The turbocharged and fuel-injected 258 cu in (4.2 L) I6 was built by Turbo-Systems Inc. to produce 450 bhp (336 kW). The car is equipped with Goodyear Eagle GT low profile 245/50x16 tires on 16x8-inch Gotti aluminum alloy wheels. The car made its debut as the official pace car for the Milwaukee 150 on 7 June 1981, for the 14 race series.

This was the final chapter in AMC's AMX racing story and the car went to AMC's Vice President of Design, Richard Teague. It has since been maintained by collectors with the AMX Turbo regularly appearing at automobile shows.

== Performance ==
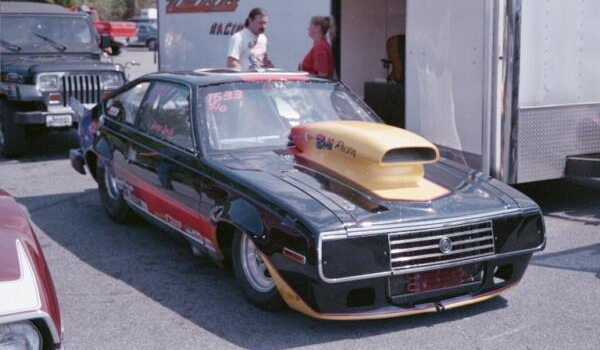
1979 AMC Spirit Pro Modified race car

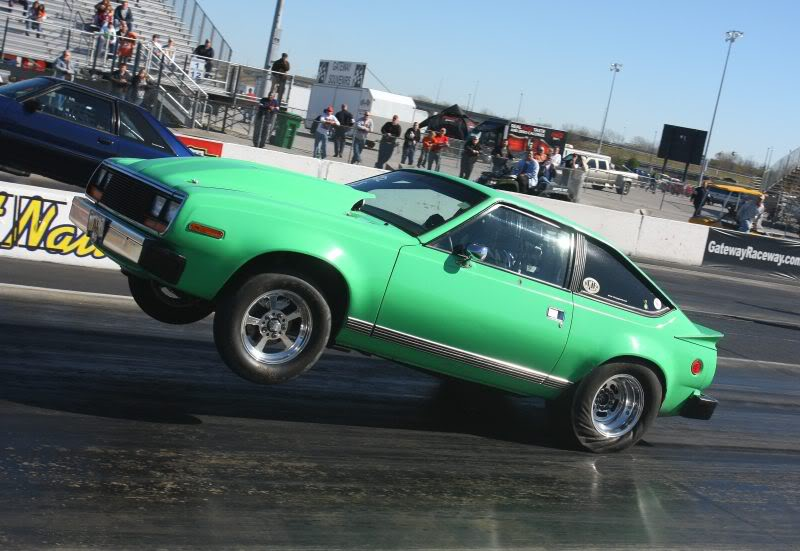
1980 AMC Spirit drag racing wheelstand

Exploiting the ease and low cost of modifying an AMC Gremlin for higher performance, as well as their inherent strength, Spirits were used in drag racing. According to Hot Rod magazine, "these little cars are very cool, and while they're not traditional muscle cars, they're plenty strong in terms of performance."

Using mostly AMC hardware, the AMC Spirit could perform exceptionally well as a street car and in multiple racing arenas (including quarter-mile e.t. of 12.8 at 110 mph (180 km/h)), with the finished vehicle costing only about $10,000. Some owners of Spirits have been converted with the 360 cu in (5.9 L) AMC V8 engines and run the quarter-mile drag strip on an 11.88 dial. AMC Spirits in the Factory Street class have run e.t. of 10.62 at 126.27 mph.

Some owners of Spirits have also heavily modified their cars for pro-class drag racing using AMC engines. Other engines have also been substituted.

== Stirling experimental engines ==
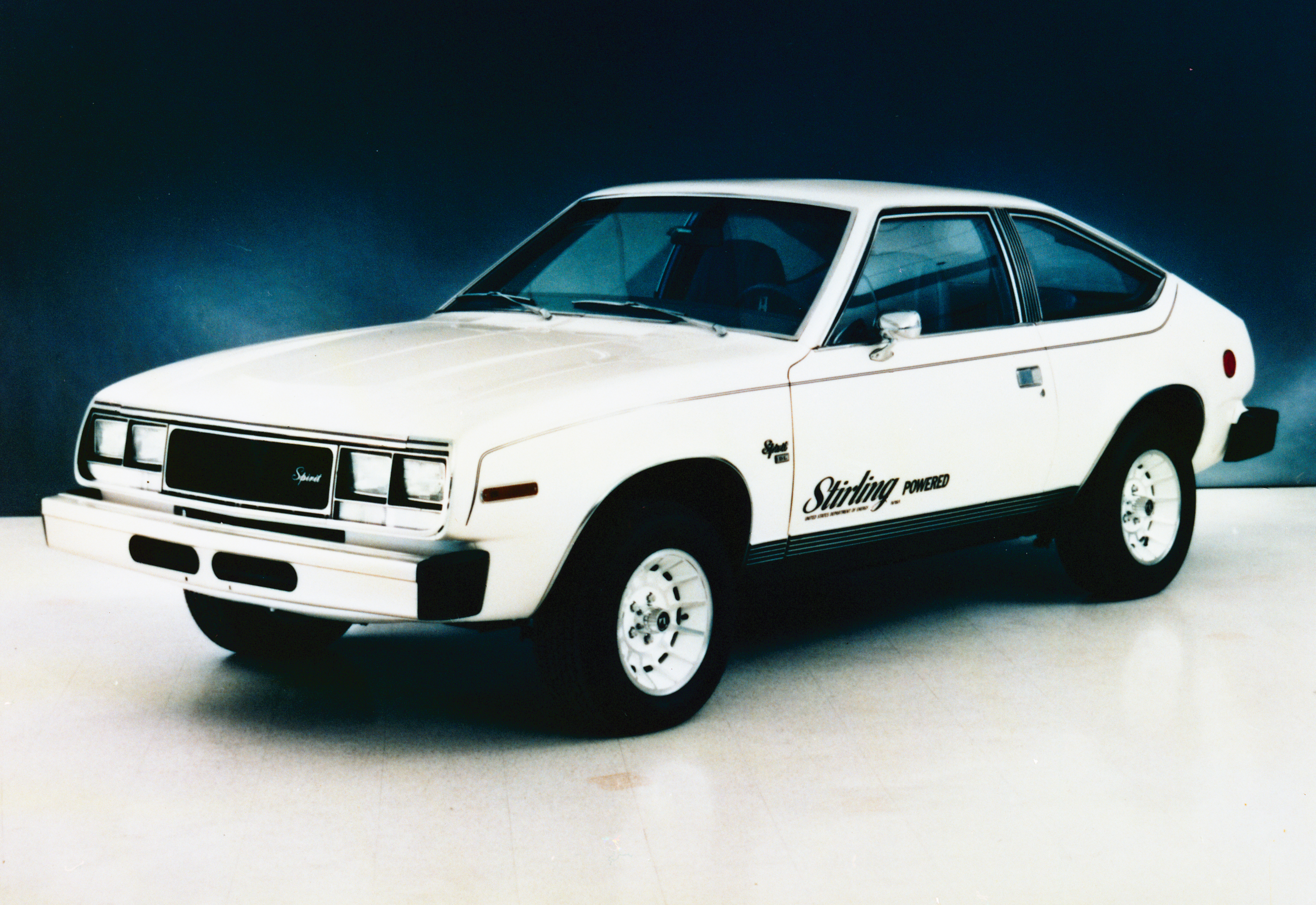
1979 Spirit with Stirling engine

The Stirling engine in the 1979 Spirit experimental vehicle

The AMC Spirit served as a test vehicle for alternative engine and fuel experiments. The Stirling engine was considered theoretically to be the most efficient of the alternative heat engines under development during the late 1970s.

The Automotive Stirling Engine (ASE) Program consisted of one large engine development contract and a small technology effort. This included a MOD 1 Stirling powered 1979 AMC Spirit engineering test vehicle built by Mechanical Technology to develop and demonstrate practical alternatives. In partnership with the United States Department of Energy (DOE), National Aeronautics and Space Administration (NASA), and built under contract by AMC's AM General wholly owned subsidiary, the United Stirling AB's "P-40" powered Spirit was tested extensively for over 50,000 miles (80,467 km) and achieved average fuel efficiency up to 28.5 mpg_{‑US} (8 L/100 km; 34 mpg_{‑imp}). The Spirit could use gasoline, diesel, or common ethanol fuel mixtures. A 1981 AMC Spirit powered by a 53-kW Stirling engine was also evaluated for performance, emissions, fuel economy, and cooling-system adequacy, but originally assembled as a transient test bed for the engine, the 3,250 lb (1,474 kg) vehicle lacked sufficient performance. The Stirling engines used early in the program delivered an acceleration time of 36 seconds, while the early upgraded Mod I engine installed in an AMC Spirit took 26 seconds. The cars were tested by General Motors Research Laboratories (CMRL) in April 1984, to provide an independent evaluation.

The tests demonstrated that the type of engine "could be developed into an automotive power train for passenger vehicles and that it could produce favorable results." However, progress was achieved with equal-power spark-ignition engines since 1977, and the Corporate Average Fuel Economy (CAFE) achieved by automobiles in the U.S. did not stand still. The Stirling engine still showed a shortfall in fuel efficiency and concerns about the ability to mass-produce it. There were also two things wrong with Stirling engine power: first was the time needed to warm up (because most drivers do not like to wait to start driving), and second was the difficulty in changing the engine's speed (thus limiting flexibility when driving). A 1980 AMC Concord was also fitted with a P-40 engine and used to inform the public about the Stirling engine and the ASE program.

The experiments showed the Stirling engine could be better to power an extended-range electric vehicle rather than serving as the primary power for an automobile. The Spirit with the Stirling engine was better suited to run at a constant power setting, in contrast to the internal combustion engine with its easy throttle regulation over a wide range. Although successful in the MOD 1 and MOD 2 phases of the experiments, cutbacks in funding further research and lack of interest by automakers ended possible commercialization of the Automotive Stirling Engine Program.

After the experiment period ended, the P-40 Stirling engine that was tested in the Spirit was removed and the car was sold at a government surplus auction.

== VAM models ==
Mexican government-owned automaker Vehiculos Automotores Mexicanos (VAM) assembled sedan and liftback Spirits under license with AMC from 1979 (sedan) and 1980 (liftback) through 1983. To meet government regulations, VAM vehicles had to have at least 60% locally sourced parts. Mexican-built "AMCs" came with different exterior and interior trim, as well as model names than their counterparts in the United States and Canada. For example, the Spirit 2-door sedan was called "Gremlin". The Spirit liftback models were called "Rally". This meant that the two Spirit body styles in Mexico were two separate lines within VAM's product mix with the sedan targeted at the economy market segment while the liftback was almost exclusively focused towards performance. The Rally-based Spirit was the successor to VAM's American Rally AMX top-of-the-line performance model that was based on the 1978 U.S. domestic market AMC Concord AMX while the Gremlin-based Spirit can be described as a generation change within an already existing model.

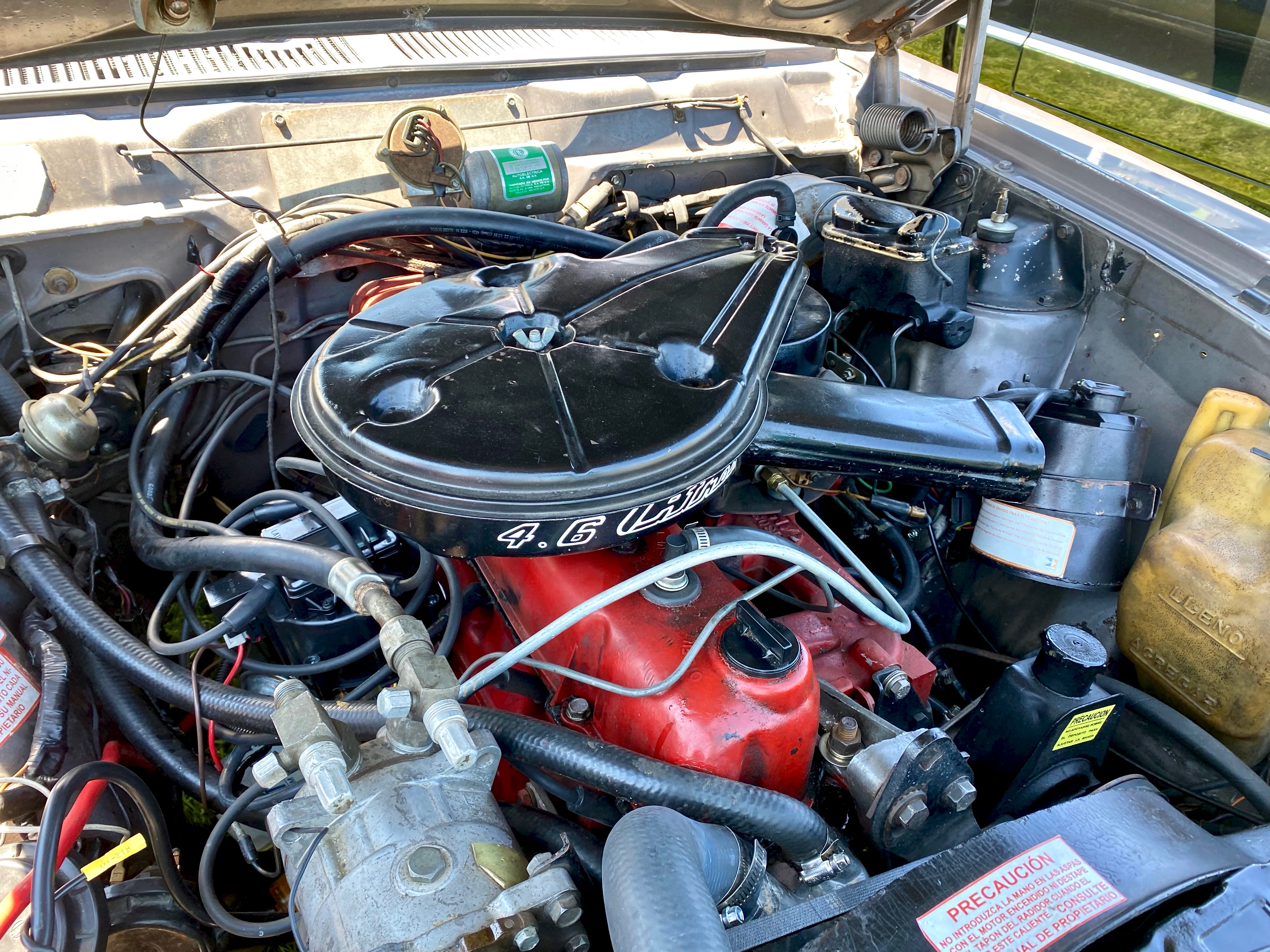
VAM 282 cu in (4.6 L) engine

All VAM engines were of AMC design, but built at the Lerma, Estado de México engine assembly plant. They featured modifications to deal with low octane fuel and high altitudes. These included different head designs and exhaust porting. An indigenous VAM engine was the 282 cu in (4.6 L) version of the AMC Straight-6 engine with an enlarged bore and wider dished pistons (3.909 in (99 mm) bore, 3.894 in (99 mm) stroke) as well as a unique head and exhaust porting design. The V8 and four cylinder engines were not available in Mexico.

=== Sedan ===
The VAM-based Spirit sedan was available in the same model configuration as the AMC Gremlin in the first half of the 1970s, including the equivalent sporty model still called the Gremlin X, which in Mexico was a higher trim level instead of an optional package. The U.S. versions such as the sedan-based Spirit DL and Spirit Limited models were not available, as also were not the previous generation's AMC Gremlin GT and AMC Gremlin Custom models. The four-cylinder engine and column-mounted shifters, plus several accessories were also not offered.

==== 1979 ====
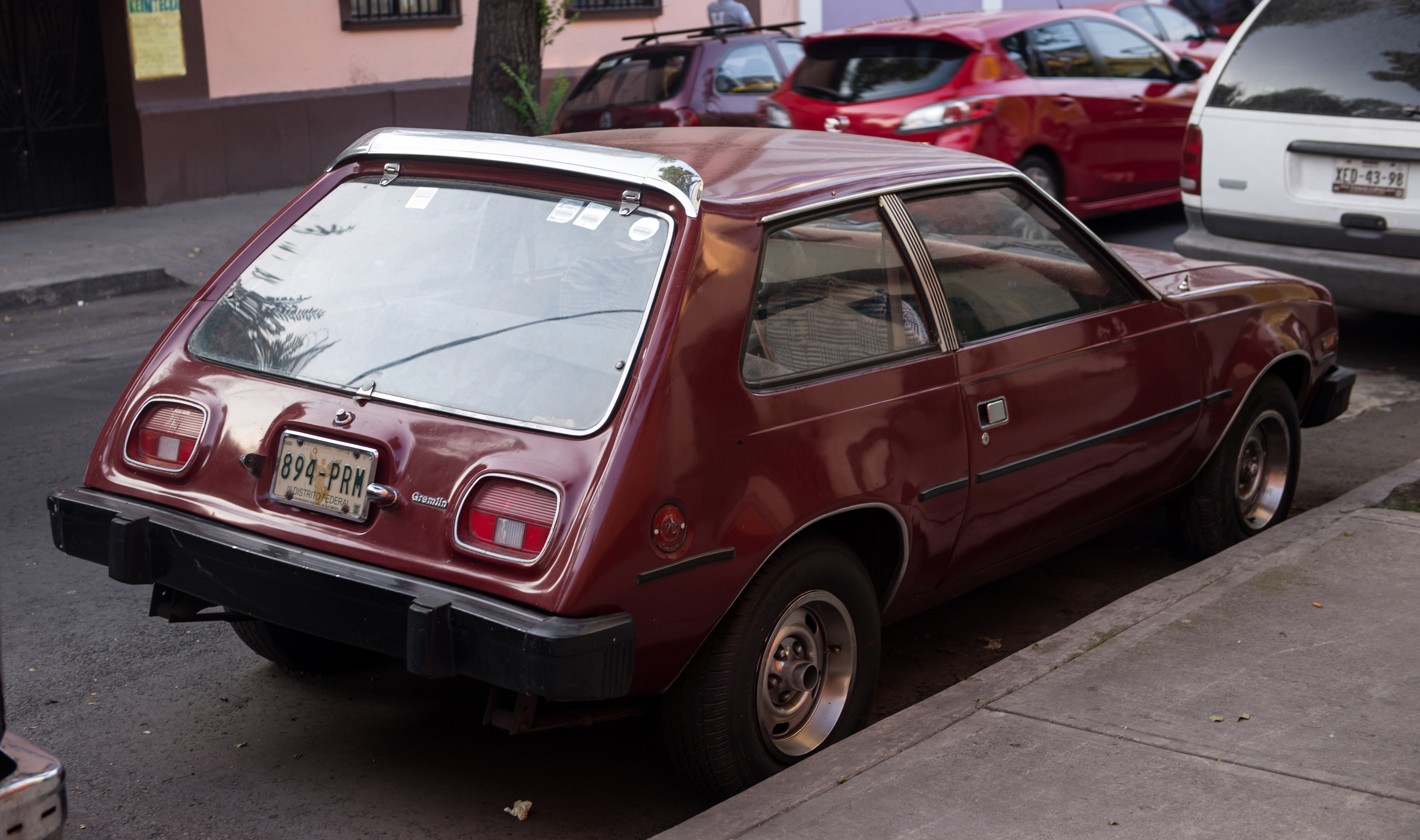
1979 VAM Gremlin X in Mexico City 2015 (missing side decals)

Both VAM versions incorporated manual front disk brakes, front sway bar, floor-mounted three-speed manual transmissions, a 3.31:1 rear differential gear ratio, and the 258 cu in (4.2 L) I6 engine with a Carter YF one-barrel carburetor, 266-degree camshaft and 8.0:1 compression ratio rated at 121 hp (90 kW; 123 PS) at 3900 rpm. Both versions were equipped with a 140 km/h / 90 mph speedometer, individual fold-down front seats, three-point seat belts, parcel shelf, front and rear ashtrays, cigarette lighter, locking glove-box, padded sun visors, carpeting, round dome light, inside hood release, rear spoiler, AM radio, and antenna. The Gremlin X model included a Hurst linkage for the manual transmission, power steering, bumper guards, wheel trim rings, narrow longer volcano hubcaps, blacked-out side glass and door window frames, wider 70X14 radial tires, front fender "4.2 Litros" decals, a sports grille designed by VAM, tinted windshield, AMC's three-arm spoked sports steering wheel with a VAM logo on the horn button, light group (lighter, glove box, courtesy, and hood), bright molding package (rocker panels, wheel lips, and drip rails), digital tachometer and retractable three-point seatbelts instead of the non-retractable fixed units. Door panels were the same in both versions except that the X had lower carpet inserts and map pouches. The roof rack that was standard on the base model was optional on the X version. The heater was optional on the base Gremlin with manual transmission and standard for the base automatic and all X versions. The base Gremlin had few options, while the Gremlin X offered a greater list. The base model offered bumper guards, power steering, a light group, a bright molding package, a tinted windshield, a sports steering wheel, and wheel trim rings. The X versions could be ordered with air conditioning, reading dome light, AM/FM radio, rear defogger, and sunroof. Options shared by both versions were limited to a TorqueFlite A904 three-speed automatic transmission, power brakes, passenger's side remote mirror, and dual remote-controlled mirrors.

==== 1980 ====
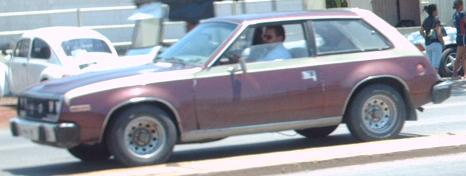
1980 VAM Gremlin in Mexico, similar to the Spirit Sedan marketed in the U.S.

The 1980 models now included a locking gas cap, and fold-down high-back individual seats with adjustable headrests, as well as the heater was made standard even on the base model with manual transmission. New features were a split rear seatback, a 180 km/h / 110 mph speedometer, new seat patterns, a seven-blade flexible fan for the 258 six, new steering wheel designs for each trim level, and a new VAM grille design shared between the two versions. The X model included a new side decal design and blacked-out hubcaps. The optional equipment list for the Gremlin X included a new AM/FM stereo radio, an electric antenna, and intermittent wipers.

==== 1981 ====
For the 1981 model year, the Spirit sedan–based VAM Gremlin saw the greatest changes since 1979. Both versions obtained a 55-amp alternator, coolant recovery tank, and fan shroud regardless of trim level or the presence of the air conditioning system, as well as a new shared grille design with vertical bars and a single horizontal one in the bottom plus a shared new seat pattern design. For the first time, door panels completely covered all previously exposed metal parts. International symbols appeared in the instrument cluster warning lights and the light beam switch was integrated into the steering column marker light lever. The Gremlin X received numerous updates. All chromed items were deleted other than the front end and rear license plate light housings while the rear spoiler was moved to the options list. Both bumpers changed to blacked-out units. Side decals were almost gone, with only a small "Gremlin X" one at the bottom corner of each C-pillar. A new leather-wrapped sports steering wheel with six simulated hex socket bolts on the horn button was used. A four-speed manual transmission with Hurst linkage and a 3.07:1 rear axle gear ratio became standard. Cars with automatic transmission retained the 3.31:1 rear gear ratio. The optional equipment list included eight-spoke sports-style steel wheels using the same volcano hubcaps as the standard wheels.

==== 1982 ====
The downturn of the Mexican economy early in 1982 and a government decree banning the importation of "luxury" automotive accessories hit the country's auto industry. The 1982 VAM Gremlin returned as a consolidated model. Both trim levels incorporated amber front parking lights and the AMC square pattern grille design that was used in U.S. domestic Eagle models. The base model incorporated chromed headlight bezels with blacked-out internal areas while the X model was completely blacked-out as also were the hood trim molding and grille. The 258 cu in (4.2 L) I6 was upgraded for the first time since 1976, receiving a higher 8.5:1 compression ratio and net output of 117 hp (87 kW; 119 PS) at 4000 rpm. The A904 automatic transmission was replaced by the A998 with wider gear ratios for the year. The base model was similar to the prior year except for the new side trim and front-end design. The X model saw the return of side decals in the form of four thin stripes starting at the base of the B-pillar trim molding and running all the way to the front edge of the fenders near the marker lights. A new silver "GX" decal appeared between the rear window and the right-side tail light. The sports steering wheel was replaced by the base design. The model was restricted to a three-speed automatic transmission with the addition of the AMX/GT's console-type shifter boot and the rear differential changed to a 3.07:1 ratio as used the year before with the now-unavailable four-speed manual.

==== 1983 ====
Early in 1983, VAM was taken over by Renault from the Mexican government and a reduced VAM passenger car line appeared for the year. This was to use up the existing inventory and to fulfill the previous agreements with sourcing companies as well as to deliver existing individual customer orders. The VAM Gremlin was carried over for 1983, becoming the last-ever AMC Spirit sedan model produced. This body style lasted one full year after AMC's dropped its equivalent from the U.S. lineup. The 1983 Gremlin was restricted to the base model with a three-speed manual transmission. It was the same as the prior year with the exception of incorporating dual remote mirrors and bumper guards as standard equipment. At a dealership level, virtually all previous accessories were still available as either individual options or packages including those of the X model. A change to the 1983 Gremlin was to the engine's head design. It incorporated smaller spark plugs and thus allowing an improved intake port configuration. The engine now featured a plastic valve cover.

=== Liftback ===
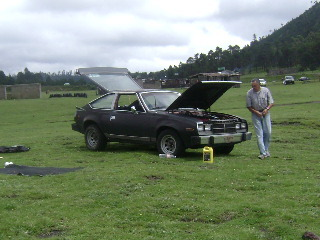
VAM Spirit liftback in Mexico

The VAM-based Spirit liftback became VAM's top-of-the-line performance product, the Rally AMX being focused to replace the previous Concord AMX–based American Rally AMX models and the Rally GT as the replacement of the limited edition Concord two-door sedan–based American 06/S. The top-performance VAM Spirit liftback was the GT rather than the AMX model. Rather than offering a range of models by AMC, the VAM versions were performance and premium models. Due to accessories and focus, the VAM Rally AMX is relatively similar to an AMC Spirit DL with a GT package and most performance options.

==== 1980 ====
The Rally-based Spirit liftbacks were available in two sports versions, the standard "Rally AMX" and the high-performance "Rally GT" in their first year. Both versions came standard with a Transmission Technologies Corporation (Tremec) 176-F four-speed manual transmission with Hurst linkage, power brakes with front discs and rear drums, power steering, front and rear sway bars, heavy-duty shock absorbers and springs, seven-bladed flexible cooling fan, tinted windshield, leather-wrapped three-arm sports steering wheel, tachometer, a center console with armrest and "Rallye" gauges plus rear ashtray, reclining bucket seats with adjustable headrests, split-back rear seat, three-point retractable seatbelts, woodgrain panels on the dashboard, full light group (hood, courtesy, ashtray, glove box) except reading dome light, blacked-out dual remote-controlled mirrors and VAM-designed aluminum grille with a central "Rally" emblem. The Rally AMX had the standard 132 hp (98 kW; 134 PS) 282 cu in (4.6 L) I6 using a 3.07:1 rear axle gear ratio, while the Rally GT came with the high-performance 172 hp (128 kW; 174 PS) version of this VAM engine and a 3.31:1 rear gear ratio. The heavy-duty cooling system consisting of a fan shroud and coolant recovery tank was optional on the AMX and standard on the GT, some units of this version came with a clutch fan instead of the regular belt-type. The Rally AMX was the "base model" of the line and the Rally GT was closer to the European tradition of performance cars with its analog tachometer (instead of the AMX's digital tach), while convenience items such as air conditioning or automatic transmission were not available. The GT model also included a rear spoiler with an electric liftgate lock release and eight-spoke steel wheels (which were optional on the AMX). The AMX came with VAM's own design five-spoke wheels with trim rings and blacked-out volcano hubcaps. The marketing effort by VAM's sales department had most GT units be equipped from the factory with all the options originally intended to be an extra cost, such as the rear defroster, reading dome light, intermittent wipers, and an AM/FM stereo radio, aside from the already mentioned steel wheels and rear spoiler. These items were all optional on the AMX.

The Rally AMX featured three-tone body side decals from the top of the front fenders to the rear corners of the side glass, a design based on AMC's 1979–1980 AMX graphics. VAM's 1977 decal design for the word "Rally" was used as background for AMC's "AMX" decal design. Both designs were one on top of the other to create a "Rally AMX" logo located on the lower front corner of each door. The Rally AMX also included a "4.6 Litros" sticker on both front fender sides. The Rally GT was more subdued, featuring only a gold-colored "American GT" emblem below the rear side glass and a large "4.6 / X" decal on the right corner of the rear spoiler. Due to a last-minute mistake or misunderstanding in VAM's management, the Rally GT was actually called "American GT" this year. The GT does not have a "Rally" emblem on its grille, which is the same design as the one used by the AMX. This also meant an "American" emblem on the glove box door instead of the "Rally" one. Early in the year, customer preference made VAM discontinue the side decals on the AMX, leaving only the superposed "Rally" and "AMX" designs and the "4.6 Litros" fender decal.

==== 1981 ====
The 1981 model year represented a radical upgrade for VAM's top performance line. An all-new "rally" emblem design in all-lowercase letters and computer-like typography appeared on both front fenders. The Rally AMX obtained a new "waved" stripe design located on the front edge of the hood and fenders with an integrated "AMX" on the right front corner. It was very discreet compared to the last year's decals while the "AMX over Rally" and "4.6 Litros" stickers were removed. The Rally GT has small "GT" stickers for the front of the hood bulge and "GT 4.6/X" stickers for the right corner of the rear spoiler. The previous year's "American GT" side decals and "GT" central rear spoiler emblem were deleted. Both versions shared all-new impressive Recardo-type reclining bucket seats with adjustable headrests, all-new door panels in vinyl with cloth and carpet inserts, but they no longer had map pouches, AMC's barred grille design used in the Eagle models made in aluminum instead of plastic, international symbols on the instrument cluster warning lights, the high beams switch integrated to the steering column, a new leather-wrapped sports steering wheel design with six fake Allen bolts on the horn button forming a hexagon, AM/FM stereo radio with four speakers as standard equipment and higher quality dashboard woodgrain panels. Mechanically, the coolant recovery tank and fan shroud became present. The optional equipment list was vastly improved; the set of power door locks and windows that debuted the year before in the American (Concord) line became available in the Rally. The GT had the electric antenna while the AMX included the rear spoiler with electric trunk release, both as standard equipment. The optional equipment list for the Rally AMX included air conditioning, automatic transmission, intermittent wipers, reading dome light, rear defroster, sports steel wheels, electric antenna, power door locks, and power windows; the list of the Rally GT was restricted to the electric locks and windows only while the rest of the accessories were standard except for the unavailable automatic transmission and air conditioning.

New for 1981 was the introduction of a third trim level within the VAM's Rally line, the company's first high-end luxury sporty model called Rally SST. This version carried the same mechanicals as the Rally AMX except that it came equipped from the factory with a three-speed automatic transmission. The car featured bright trim on the rocker panels, wheel lips, drip rails, B-pillar molding plus door and side glass bases. The moldings for the windshield and rear glass were also bright instead of blacked out while both bumpers were chromed. The lower portions of the sides, doors, and front fenders carried wide moldings with a horizontal six-stripe pattern. The in-house five-spoke wheels held AMC's "Noryl" wheel cover design. Finally, chromed squared mirrors with inside controls were fitted to the doors. The Rally SST is the closest VAM counterpart to the AMC Spirits in terms of appearance and the Mexican equivalent of the U.S. AMC Spirit Limited model. To enhance the luxury appointments of the line, a fender-mounted electric antenna was made standard equipment so the AMX's sporty roof-mounted diagonal design would not be present. The rear spoiler was not available. Among its unique characteristics, the Rally SST included side armrest safety reflectors and a sun visor with a lighted vanity mirror from the factory, which were unavailable in the AMXs and GTs. The interior of the Rally SST was the same as that of the GTs and AMXs with the only exceptions of the center console having an open compartment in place of the auxiliary gauges and the quartz electric digital clock instead of both tachometer types. Despite the luxury focus, the sporty aspects were retained in the form of the individual reclining Recaro-type bucket seats, a center console with armrest and rear ashtray, floor-mounted transmission, leather-wrapped sports steering wheel, and the full suspension package with rear sway bar.

VAM originally intended the Rally SST to include as standard equipment only the same accessories as the 1981 Rally GT and the optional equipment list of the 1981 Rally AMX except for its own share of exclusive and not available accessories. However, the same story as the 1980 Rally GT repeated itself for the 1981 Rally SST. The need to stress differences between not just the three-version Rally line but also the new Spirit-based Lerma model forced VAM to act any way it could. Once again, the company's sales department determined that virtually all Rally SST units included all optional convenience accessories available in the Rally line from the factory. The final list of equipment for the Rally SST consisted of a tinted windshield, intermittent wipers, rear defroster, electric antenna, a full light group including a reading dome light, AM-FM stereo radio, quartz clock, a center console with a compartment, armrest, and a rear ashtray, lighted vanity mirror, side armrest safety reflectors, cigarette lighter, front ashtray, locking glove box, leather-wrapped sports steering wheel, inside hood release, air conditioning, parcel shelf, power door locks, power windows, power trunk release, dual remote-controlled mirrors, reclining bucket seats, retractable seatbelts, and removable trunk cover.

==== 1982 ====
Despite the Rally's outstanding performance on both the street and in the market, it was affected by a series of unexpected problems. Internally, VAM suffered problems with customers confusing the Rally SST and the three-door Lerma models. Moreover, the Lerma's high price and relatively plain looks for a high-end luxury model (intended to become VAM's new flagship since the departure of the Matador-based Classic line) meant low sales that turned out to be below VAM's expectations for the year. VAM gave priority to the Lerma and the high-trim American (Concord) models for luxury compared to the Rally line. The Lerma for 1982 was changed from being a single version to two different versions to create a price difference. The final flagship of the company was available as the semi-equipped Lerma 610 and the fully equipped Lerma 620, both in three and five doors. Externally, a set of misguided moves from the Mexican government took their toll on the whole auto industry. First, the legal exemption of up to 500 automobile engines without emission certification was revoked, affecting directly the high-performance 4.6/X engine of the Rally GT models. This was followed by a decree banning the importation of automotive luxury accessories that affected the whole auto industry. The only way for the automakers to keep on offering those accessories was to have them either produced or sourced locally, some found a replacement while others did not. In the VAM Rally's case, the list of accessories that were lost included the bullet-shaped sports remote mirrors, power door locks, power windows, electric trunk release, rear spoiler, analog tachometer, rear defroster, the Quartz digital clock, and the center console with armrest and rear ashtray.

VAM's decision to focus all efforts on the new two-version Lerma model plus the loss of luxury accessories meant the discontinuation of Rally SST for 1982. The loss of the exemption of 500 units of automobile engines without emission certification forced the retirement of the Rally GT. The only model left for 1982 was the Rally AMX, with substantial differences from the previous two years. The taillight surrounding areas plus the headlight bezels and front hood molding were completely blacked out, the last two parts also having a horizontal red stripe passing from edge to edge. An all-new grille design with a horizontal bar at the same height of the bezels' division between the parking lights and headlights and a vertical bar at the very center; behind these was a set of smaller narrower horizontal lines. Both bumpers for the year were those of the AMC Eagle SX/4 Sport, being blacked out and equipped with thick nerfing strips with central bright moldings and longer more aerodynamic bumper end caps with their respective bright molding. Unlike the previous two years, no decals or stickers of any kind were used. The standard wheel designs for the year were the eight-spoke steel units with blacked-out volcano hubcaps. Due to the impossibility of having the bullet-type door mirrors reproduced, the model switched to a sporty design that was used in the 1978 through 1980 models. However, the remote controls for these mirrors while still available were moved to the options list. The Recaro-type seats received new patterns with a smaller bucket shape to allow an easier in and out of the car on the driver's side (due to the lack of a tilt steering column). The door panels were the same units as in 1981 except for the change in the fabric portion from plain to a pattern of vertical stripes and the removal of a fake chrome molding in place of a woodgrain unit. The six-bolt sports steering wheel was replaced by a leather-wrapped three-arm Nardi unit. VAM managed to find a local company to reproduce the center console, but it was reduced to the shifter and gauges portions, deleting the armrest with the rear ashtray. Although a reduction in conveniences, two new options arrived for the year in the form of the AM/FM stereo tape player radio and the rear wiper and washer. The car received two changes in the mid-year, the first being a new wooden sports steering wheel and the second a new set of ten-round-spoked steel wheels. The only mechanical changes for the year were wider gear ratios for the A998 automatic transmission and in the mid-year, a new engine head design with rounded internal intake ports and smaller spark plug outlets, still retaining the metal valve cover of the previous years. A different head gasket was used to bring the compression ratio from 8.0:1 to 8.5:1.

The Rally GT and the Rally SST did not disappear completely this year; this can be described that they were downgraded from being trim levels to optional packages that were offered by several VAM dealerships. A Rally SST equivalent was created including most of the still available optional items including automatic transmission, air conditioning, rear wiper and washer, reading dome light, intermittent wipers, lighted vanity mirror on passenger's side sun visor, and built-in side armrest safety reflectors. The only options that were separate at all times were the new tape player, electric antenna, and mirror controls. This set of components was called "paquete de lujo" by VAM's dealerships and the units carrying it had no particular name or designation. On the other side of the coin, there was a second optional package for Rally AMXs with a manual transmission that included all mechanical components of the Rally GT 4.6 / X engine (302-degree camshaft, headers, Holley 2300 two-barrel carburetor, counterweight-modified high-acceleration Prestolite electronic distributor, and 3.31:1 rear differential gears) except for the ported head. Unlike the luxury package, units equipped with the performance one did get a special name that was either Rally ZX or Rally TX, depending on the dealership that sold the unit.

==== 1983 ====
The collapse of the Mexican economy in 1982 hit VAM along with the local auto industry. In February 1983, the Mexican government sold its share of VAM to Renault. The new owner was focused more on the Jeep vehicles along with VAM's dealer network and production facilities. Renault reduced production of VAM's passenger car line so it would not compete with its own products. The remaining 1983 VAM cars existed mostly to use up the highest possible amount of existing inventories, to fulfill the previous agreements with sourcing companies as well as delivering the existing individual customer orders. The 1983 Rally AMX is almost an exact copy of the 1982 model, specifically the second half of the model year production. The only differences between both are the presence of a rear ashtray design shared with the Gremlin and American (due to the loss of the console-mounted rear ashtray), a locally produced instrument cluster replacing the imported unit, and the chromed squared door mirrors originally used on the Rally SST (minus the still optional controls). Both optional packages of 1982 were still available this year.

=== Lerma ===
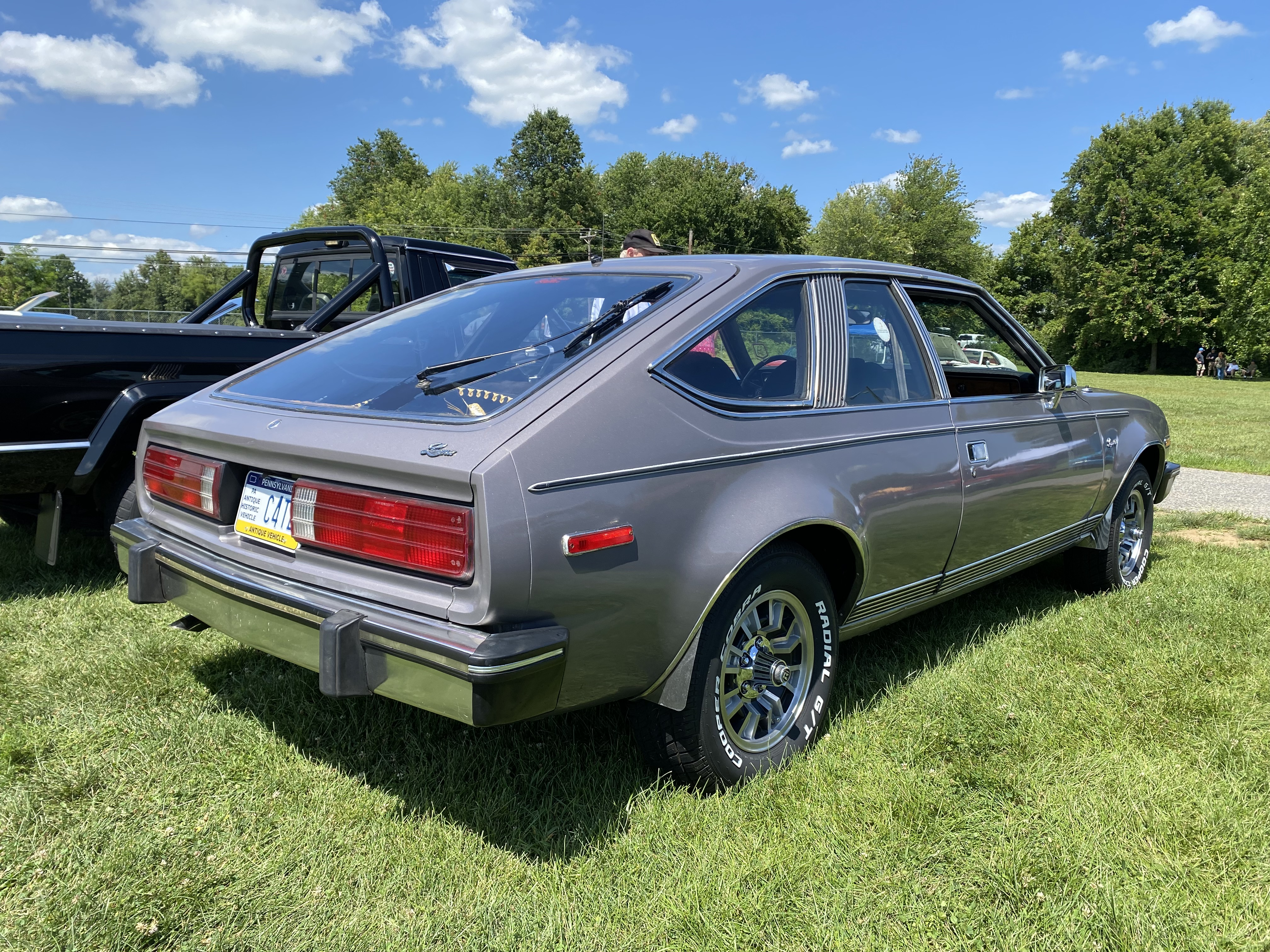
VAM Lerma 620 two-door liftback

A unique to Mexico was the vehicle called the VAM Lerma that was based on the Concord's sedan chassis and incorporated the Spirit's rear liftback body parts and unique rear quarter panels.

== Dodge Spirit ==
The Spirit name was used by Chrysler, which took over AMC in 1987, for a four-door compact sedan called the Dodge Spirit from 1989 through 1995 model years.
