= Doug Nash =

Doug Nash († 12 July 2015) was an American hot rodder, drag racer. He is known for driving the Bronco Buster Ford Bronco wheelstander exhibition funny car and for building racing transmissions.

== Background ==
Nash was born in Detroit, Michigan, with a brother, Dan, and a sister, Darlene. He attended Garden City High School.

== Racing career ==
Nash drove the Bob Ford G/Stock 289 cu in (4.74 L) Ford Fairlane in 1963, with engine preparation by Ernie MacEwan (who worked at the Ford Experimental Vehicle Garage). There was synergy between Nash, MacEwan, and the Fairlane, including the addition of ladder bars and a new intake manifold, and Nash achieved significant success, moving up to C/Gas.

Nash's success got him a ride in the 1965 factory 289 Mercury Comet, one of only fifteen 289-powered Comets built that year. It was dubbed The Cyclone when the car moved up to B/FX (B/Factory Experimental). After turning in a number of wins, Nash moved up again, to A/FX, a precursor to Funny Car.

It was for A/FX Nash built the Bronco Buster, based on a 1966 Ford Bronco. The 289 was kept mostly stock, but it propelled the truck to passes in the high 8s; with a supercharger, later in 1966, Nash turned in passes in the 8.30 second range with speeds around 180 mph (290 km/h), and only difficulties with keeping the truck running in a straight line prevented even lower e.t.s

Nash and Bronco Buster were popular on the match racing circuit, until NHRA banned aluminum chassis (in favor of steel) and Jeep and pickup bodies, following the success of Gene Conway in the hemi Jeep Destroyer, in 1967.

== After racing ==
When Nash retired from drag racing, he opened Doug Nash Equipment & Engineering. At the beginning he developed engine prototypes for major U.S. carmakers. Later, he designed and manufactured a series of four- and five-speed racing transmissions, known for straight-cut spur gears and crash shifts, and for which he is now best known. These were so successful, he was approached by Chevrolet to provide his "4+3" transmission—a four-speed manual with automatic overdrive on the top with three gears—on the 1984 through 1988 Corvettes.

Nash also had an interest in antique toy trains.

== Family ==
Nash was married to Lesli Diane. They lived for a while in the Cayman Islands, then moved to the Florida Keys, opening a boat rental business with his brother, Dan.

Nash had a daughter, Noelle, and two granddaughters, Emmeline and Violet.

== Death ==
Nash died of cancer. He was 73. He asked that his body be donated to science.
