= Bronco Buster (Funny Car) =

Overview
- Designer: Doug Nash

Body and chassis
- Class: A/FX, Top Fuel Funny Car
- Body style: Wheelstander exhibition funny car

Powertrain
- Engine: 289 cu in (4.7 L) Ford V8
- Transmission: Four-speed manual

Bronco Buster is an American wheelstander exhibition funny car built by Doug Nash.

Nash built Bronco Buster for NHRA's new A/FX (A/Factory Experimental) class, a precursor to Funny Car, which debuted in 1965. It was based on a 1966 Ford Bronco, with a reproduction two-piece body, fitted over an aluminum tube chassis; the cab, hood, and front fenders came off in one piece for easy maintenance.

It was powered by the same 289 cu in (4.7 L) Ford V8 Nash used in his previous B/FX car. (It is rumored Nash turned down a SOHC 427 “cammer” so he could keep the four-speed manual transmission, instead of switching to a C4 automatic.) Published reports put Bronco Buster's weight at 1,700 lb (770 kg), but it may have been as little as 1,400 lb (640 kg); Nash's target was 1,200 lb (540 kg). The 289 was kept mostly stock, beyond O-rings and a cast aluminum girdle, but it propelled the truck to passes in the high 8s; with a supercharger, later in 1966, Nash turned in passes in the 8.30 second range with speeds around 180 mph (290 km/h), and only difficulties with keeping the truck running in a straight line prevented even lower e.t.s.

Bronco Buster was popular on the match racing circuit, until NHRA banned aluminum chassis (in favor of steel) and Jeep and pickup bodies, following the success of Gene Conway in the hemi Jeep funny car Destroyer, in 1967.

Bronco Buster was the centerfold in Drag Strip's February 1967 issue, as well as appearing on the cover in an inset photo.

== Sources ==
- McClurg, Bob. "50 Years of Funny Cars: Part 2" in Drag Racer, November 2016, pp. 35–50.
- Wallace, Dave. "50 Years of Funny Cars: Part 1" in Drag Racer, November 2016, pp. 21–32.
