= Bronco Buster (Proctor) =

Statue by Alexander Phimister Proctor in Denver, Colorado, U.S.

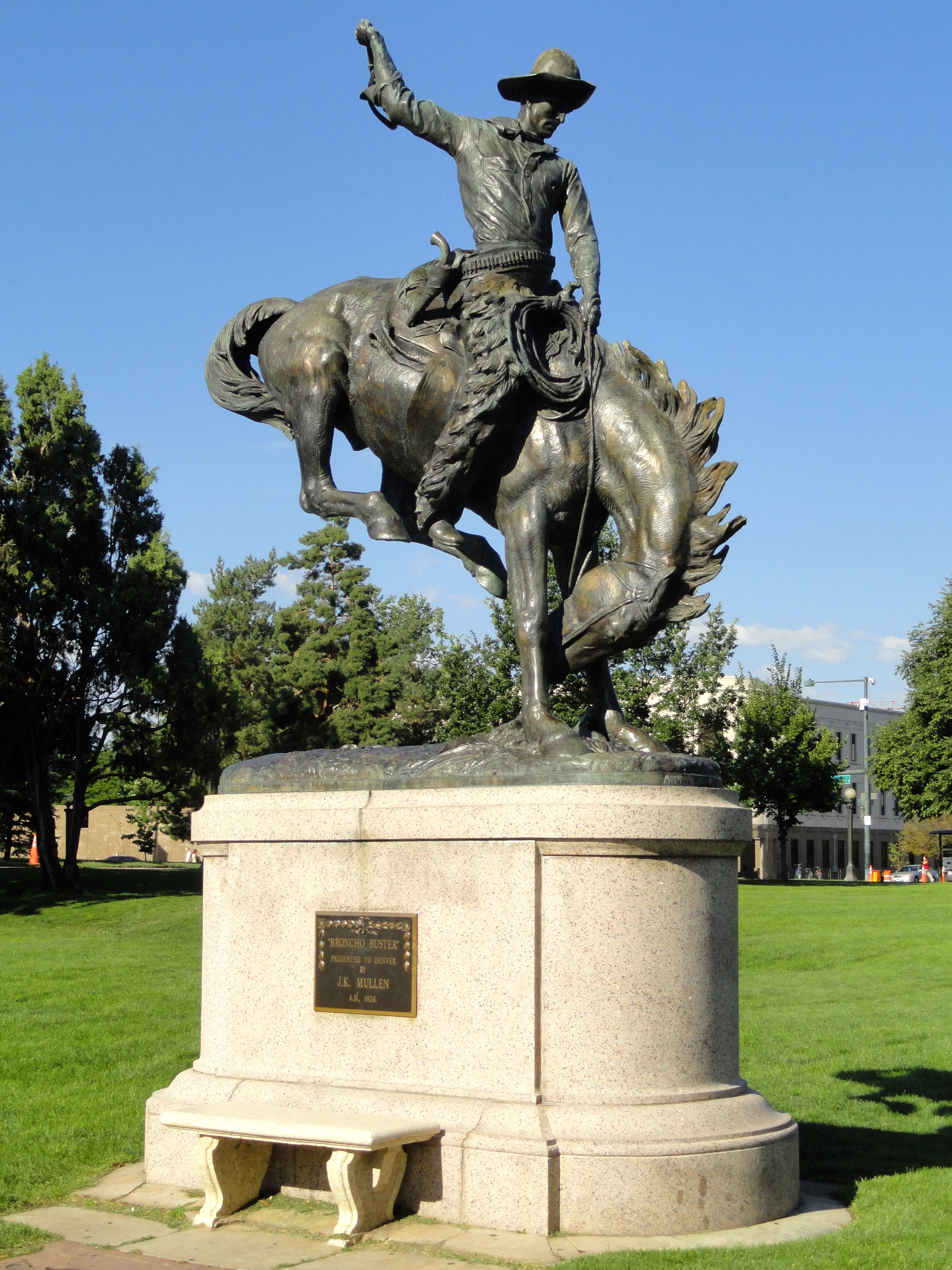
- The statue in 2011
- Artist: Alexander Phimister Proctor
- Year: 1920
- Location: Denver, Colorado, United States
- 39.738912°N 104.989069°W

Bronco Buster is a 1920 statue by Alexander Phimister Proctor, installed in Denver, Colorado, United States.
