= Wheelstand competition =

Wheelstand competition is a form of motorsport where specially prepared vehicles compete in order to have the highest, longest, most photogenic and violent wheelstand, normally in dragstrips or Monster Trucks.

This is not a very popular form of motorsport but it has grown in North America.

== Competitions ==
The most famous competition is the World Power Wheel Standing Championships held at Byron Dragway, which has been televised in SPEED TV's Lucas Oil On the Edge. This competitions attract drivers from Canada and United States of America.

Monster Trucks occasionally hold wheel stand competitions; where they perform wheel stands, while crushing cars beneath them.
