= AMC Eagle =

Compact car produced by American Motors Corporation

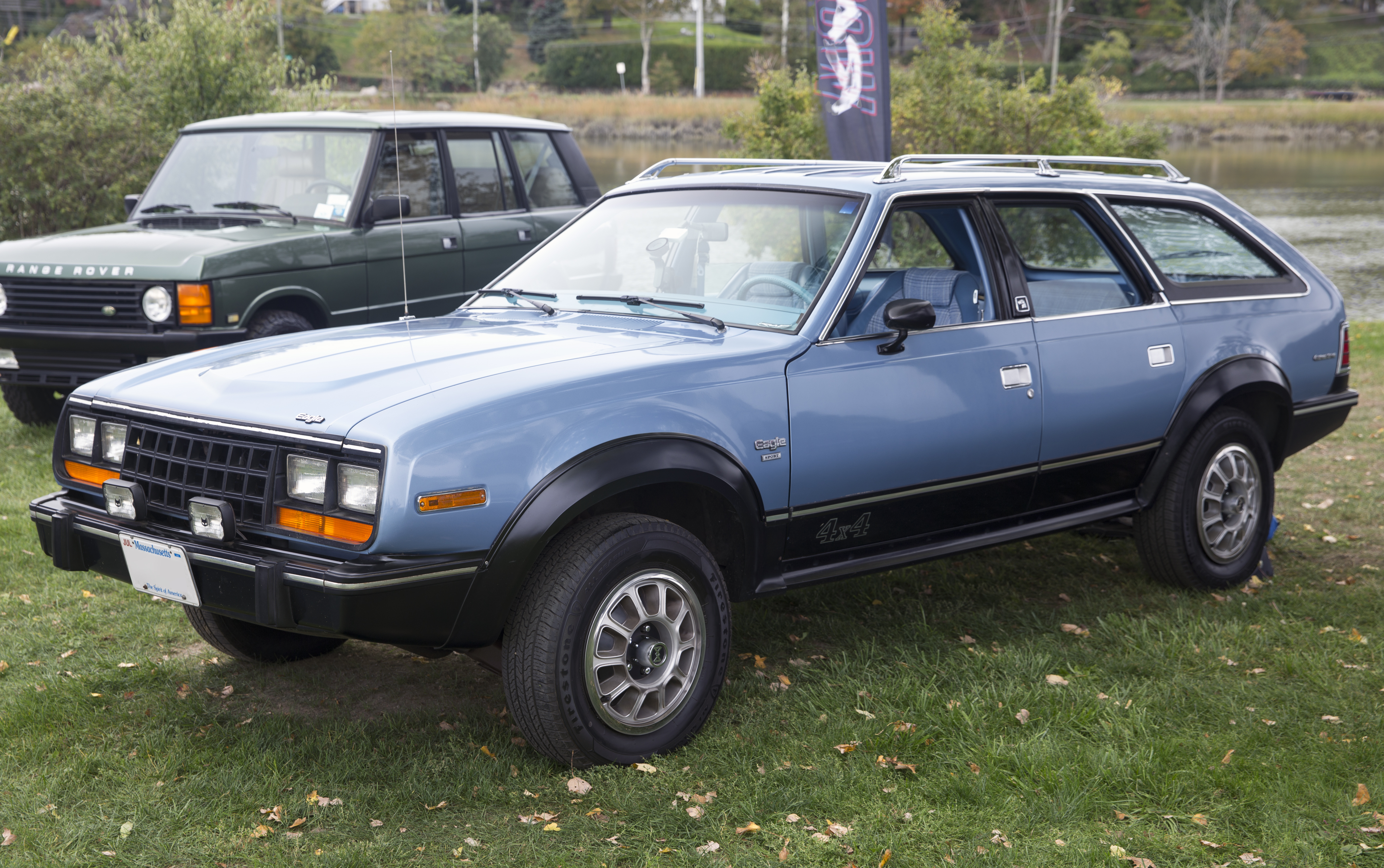
- 1981 AMC Eagle Sport Wagon

Overview
- Manufacturer: American Motors Corporation (1980–1987); Chrysler Corporation (1987–1988)
- Also called: Eagle Wagon (MY1988)
- Production: August 1979 – December 1987
- Model years: 1980–1988
- Assembly: United States: Kenosha, Wisconsin (Kenosha Engine: 1980–1983); Canada: Brampton, Ontario (Brampton Assembly: 1984–1988)
- Designer: Dick Teague

Body and chassis
- Class: Compact car
- Body style: 2-door coupé; 2-door hatchback; 4-door sedan; 4-door station wagon; 2-door convertible
- Layout: Front engine, four-wheel drive
- Related: AMC Concord; AMC Gremlin; AMC Hornet; AMC Spirit

Powertrain
- Engine: 150 cu in (2.5 L) AMC I4; 151 cu in (2.5 L) GM Iron Duke I4; 258 cu in (4.2 L) AMC I6
- Transmission: 4-speed manual; 5-speed manual; 3-speed TorqueFlite automatic

Dimensions
- Wheelbase: 97.2 in (2,469 mm) liftback/kammback; 109.3 in (2,776 mm) coupe/sedan/wagon
- Length: 166.6 in (4,232 mm) liftback/kammback; 186.2 in (4,729 mm) coupe/sedan/wagon
- Width: 73.0 in (1,854 mm) liftback/kammback; 72.3 in (1,836 mm) coupe/sedan/wagon
- Height: 55.2 in (1,402 mm) liftback/kammback; 54.4 in (1,382 mm) coupe/sedan; 54.6 in (1,387 mm) wagon

The AMC Eagle is a compact four-wheel drive passenger vehicle manufactured and marketed in a single generation by American Motors Corporation (AMC) for the 1980 to 1987 model years continued by Chrysler Corporation following its acquisition of AMC in 1987, for the 1988 model year.

Introduced in August 1979 for the 1980 model year, the coupe, sedan, and station wagon body styles were based on the AMC Concord. In 1981, the two-door subcompact-sized AMC Spirit-based models, the SX/4 and Kammback, joined the Eagle line aimed at both first-time buyers and fleet sales.

A Sundancer convertible conversion for the larger Eagle two-door model was available during 1981 and 1982. By 1984, only sedan and station wagon versions were available. For 1988, its final model year, only a station wagon was offered, marketed as the "Eagle Wagon". However, the name continued to be used by Chrysler Corporation as the Eagle brand of cars through 1998.

The AMC Eagles were the only four-wheel drive passenger cars produced in the United States at the time. All models featured "passenger-car comfort, plus 4WD security for all-weather security." Marketing materials of the time refer to the Eagle as a "vehicle," "automobile," "car," or “sport machine.” Although the description was not in use at the time, the AMC Eagle is widely recognized as the first crossover vehicle.

== History ==
=== The concept ===
Fuel-thirsty vehicles built for rugged off-road were on the market, but AMC "predicted that consumers would embrace a vehicle with the comfort of an automobile, but the ride height and foul-weather capabilities of a four-wheel drive utility vehicle." The objective was an affordable car with comfortable ride and handling on the road and superior traction in light off-road use.

The initial proposal for production of what would become the AMC Eagle came from Roy Lunn, the chief design engineer for AMC Jeep. "Project 8001 plus Four" was Lunn's code name for a new "line of four-wheel drive vehicles with the ride and handling conventions of a standard rear-wheel drive car" built on a unibody platform. In February 1977, AMC contracted FF Developments to build a prototype vehicle based on a production V8-powered AMC Hornet with drive torque split 33% front and 66% rear. Testing and further development proved the feasibility of a vehicle with greater ground clearance, larger 15-inch wheels, and a torque split closer to 50% – 50%, with Lunn recommending using the AMC straight-six engine coupled to an automatic transmission.

Thus, the AMC Eagle came about when Jeep's chief engineer joined a Concord body with a four-wheel drive system. Such a vehicle was a logical step for AMC, according to the CEO Gerald C. Meyers. A second energy crisis had hit in 1979. Sales of AMC's highly profitable truck-based Jeep line dropped due in part to their low fuel efficiency. This forced AMC into a precarious financial position. The Eagle provided a low-cost way of bridging the gap between AMC's solid and economical, but aging, passenger-car line and its well-regarded, but decidedly off-road focused, Jeep line, as the Eagle used the existing Concord (and later, Spirit) automobile platform.

The Eagle also bridged the sizable price gap between the low-end imported four-wheel drive (4WD) Subaru and the large-sized domestic Four-wheel drive vehicles such as the Jeep Wagoneer. The Eagle models provided the most significant new boost to the automaker's profit mix. Sales were brisk since Day One, with the manufacturer's suggested retail price (MSRP) for the basic two-door model starting at $6,999 (US$27,349 in 2025 dollars) and the 4-door station wagon at $7,549 (US$29,498 in 2025 dollars). The Eagle represented a "burst of AMC's genetic creativity...quickly captured the attention of many American drivers who found its unique union of four-wheel drive safety and security with the comfort of an automobile."

The early AMC Eagles had a full-time automatic system that operated in permanent all-wheel drive (AWD). The drivetrain added about 300 pounds (136 kg) to the Eagle's curb weight. The AMC Eagles were also the first mass-produced U.S. Four-wheel drive automobiles with an independent front suspension. The 1963 Jeep Wagoneer and Gladiator pickups featured an independent front suspension with 4WD as well as the revised for 1980 truck-based Ford Bronco and F-Series vehicles.

The AMC Eagle's central differential behind its TorqueFlite automatic transmission was a single-speed (without a low-range option). It featured a viscous fluid coupling for the quiet and smooth power transfer to the axle with the most traction on wet or dry pavement. The central unit consisted of closely spaced, wavy clutch plates operating in a "honey-like silicone fluid" performing a "limited-slip function" between the front and rear drives, as well as under adverse driving conditions sending torque to the axle with the most traction.

Designed as "reasonably size[d] passenger cars" offering a comfortable ride and handling on pavement, the AMC Eagles "behave more like mountain goats" when off the road. The value of 4WD in the AMC Eagle was apparent when driving in slippery conditions. They served in America's first ice-driving school. The Eagle models provided the comfort and appointments expected of passenger models, combined with off-road technology offering an extra margin of safety and traction. The Eagle was designed for customers who "must get through regardless of road or weather conditions (doctors, police, emergency personnel, and so on)" as well as those living in areas with bad weather or roads, and adventurous hunters and fishermen. The AMC Eagle did not compete with traditional, rudimentary 4WD vehicles. The company did not design the Eagle as an off-pavement recreation vehicle, but rather as a passenger car that offers added benefits. Not built for off-road performance as a Chevrolet Blazer or a Jeep Cherokee, the Eagle "will overcome mud, sand, snow, and obstacles that would stop ordinary sedans cold."

The AMC Eagle was one of the first production cars to use an AWD system. Other 4WD automobile-type vehicles – the Subaru DL/GL (1972 for the Japanese domestic market and two years later in the U.S.), and much later the Toyota Tercel SR5 Wagon (1983) - only had part-time 4WD systems that could not be engaged on dry pavement. The Eagle was also years ahead of Subaru's simplistic, part-time front-drive/4WD system, due to Roy Lunn's creativity and Jeep's experience producing 4WD vehicles. Another feature was the Eagle's independent front suspension, accomplished by mounting the front differential to the engine block with universal joints and half shafts to drive the front wheels.

Automotive industry analysts were surprised by the fact that AMC, a company most had deemed past its ability to produce competitive vehicles, used their limited resources to create a novel and all-around competent vehicle. In doing so, the small American manufacturer was seen as having pioneered a new market segment – one that would grow wildly over the next 25 years and beyond, as evinced by Four Wheeler magazine's conclusion in 1980 that the new AMC Eagle was, indeed, "The beginning of a new generation of cars." Even as the automaker was struggling financially, "AMC's reputation for developing vehicles on the cheap is only exceeded by its legacy of midwifing the SUV", including the Eagle to be the precursor to one of the most popular vehicle types on the market. Indeed, the Eagle's basic concept - that of a station wagon with AWD, raised ground clearance, full range of power options, and automatic transmissions, as well as the rough-road capability - has inspired vehicles such as the Subaru Outback and Forester lines, the Audi Allroad, the Volkswagen Passat Alltrack, the Volvo XC range, and many others. Similarly, motoring journalist Marty Padgett described AMC's car-based 1980 Eagle, combining all-weather capability with better gas mileage, as "the first crossover," that was succeeded by whole generations of Subaru vehicles and other models.

A long-term road test conducted in 2009 of a new Suzuki crossover vehicle described the original AMC Eagle as "combined two disparate personalities – rugged, childlike playfulness and staunch paternal responsibility – in a way that few thought possible in 1980. And for all the Eagle's lowly heritage, it has set a lasting standard for utility and a friendly, innovative spirit that has eluded most of the compact crossovers on the market today." An article in a series about innovations and icons, the BBC wrote, "the Eagle was, in essence, the kind of segment-busting product that engineers and marketers spend entire careers trying to create."

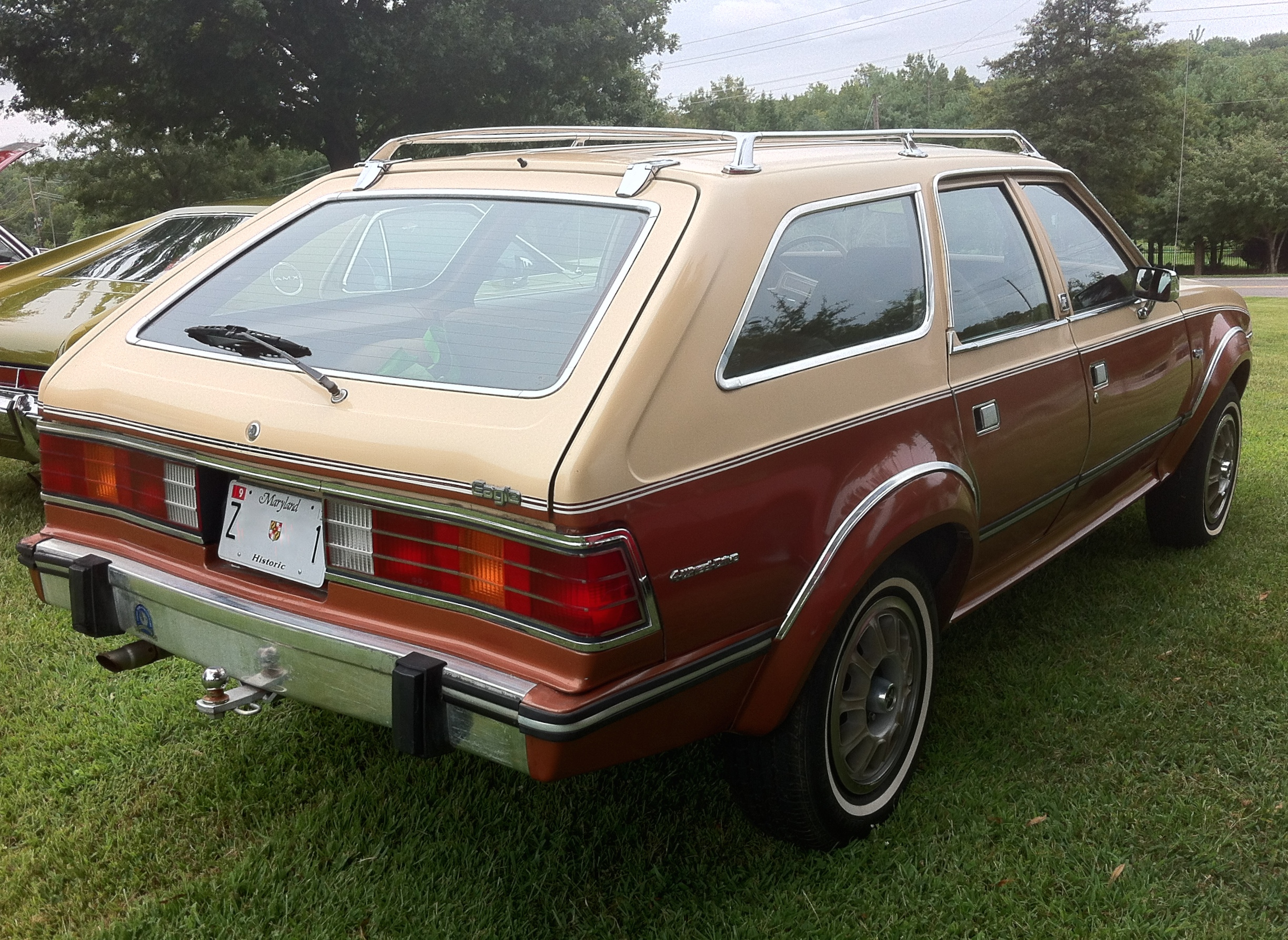
AMC Eagle Wagon in two-tone finish

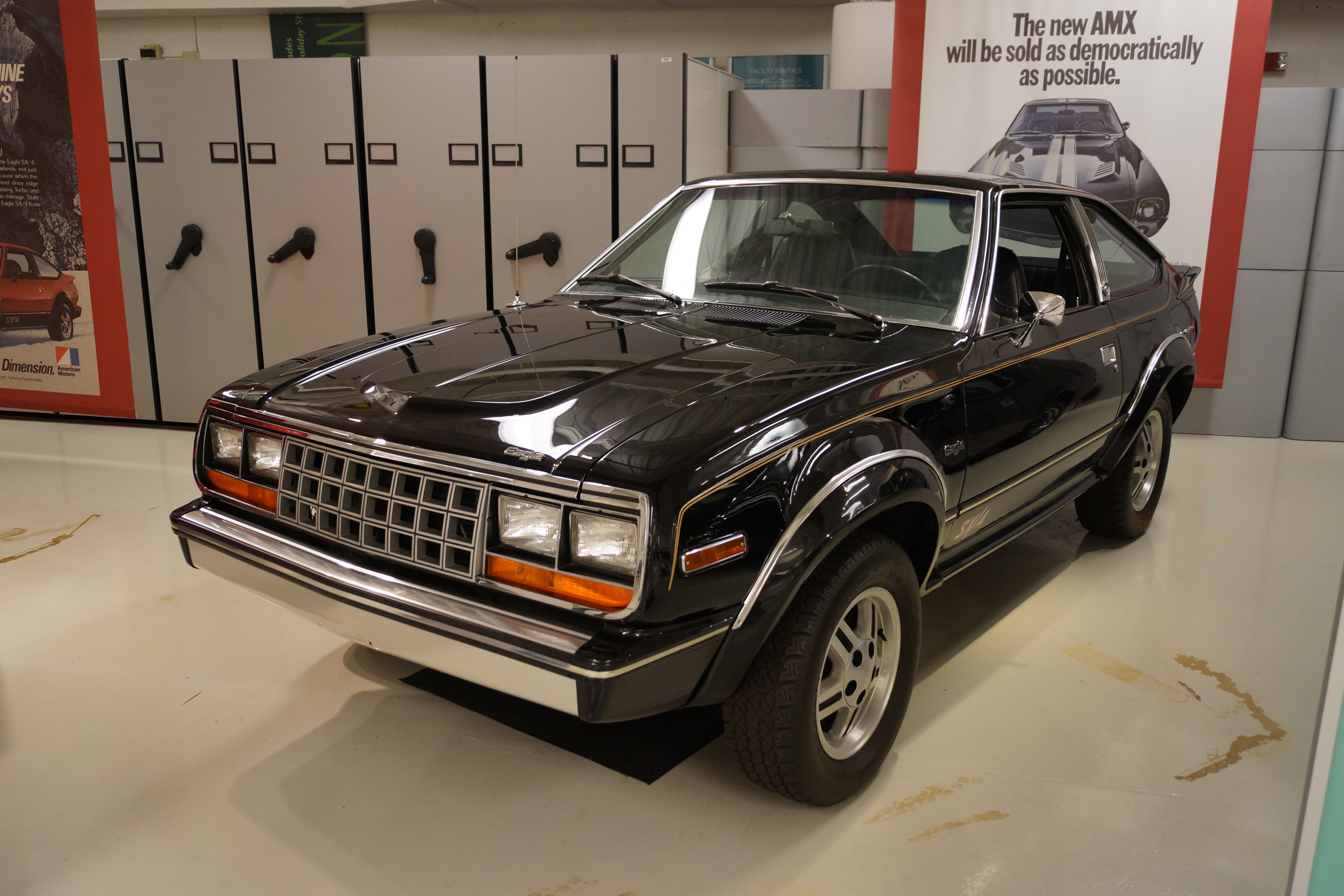
AMC Eagle SX/4 liftback

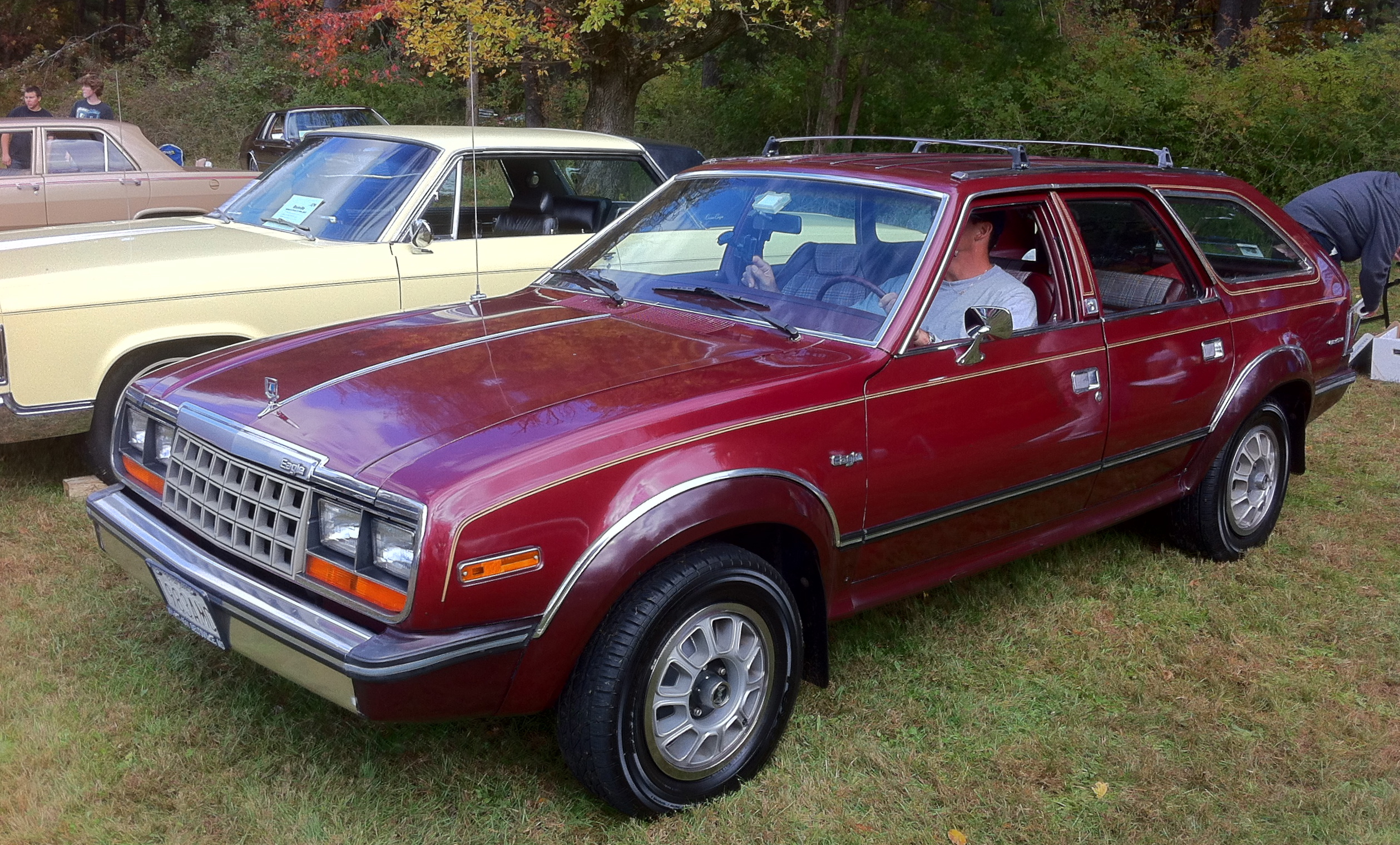
AMC Eagle Wagon at classic car show

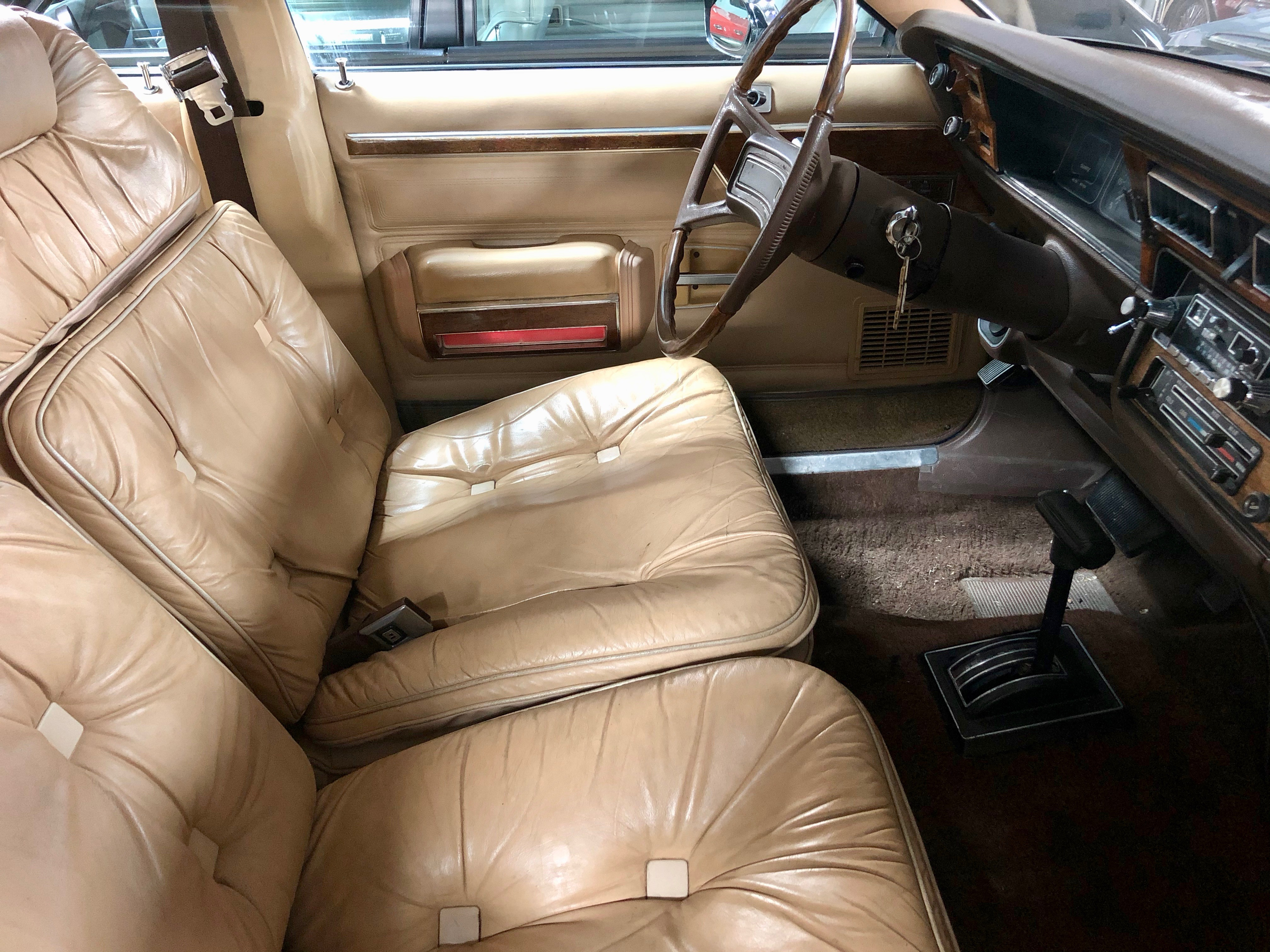
AMC Eagle interiors focused on comfort and luxury

=== Model years ===
==== 1980 ====
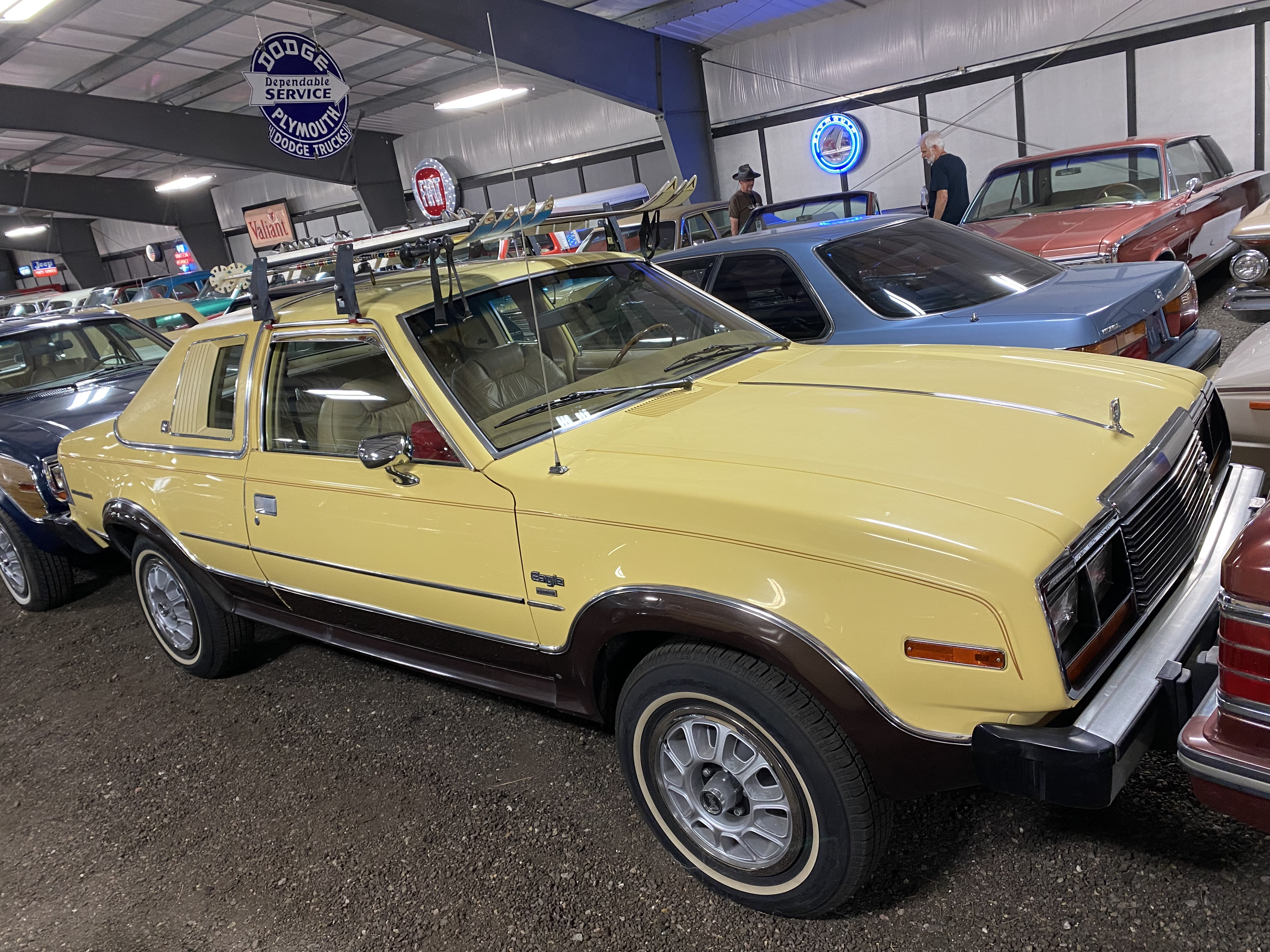
1980 AMC Eagle Limited coupe

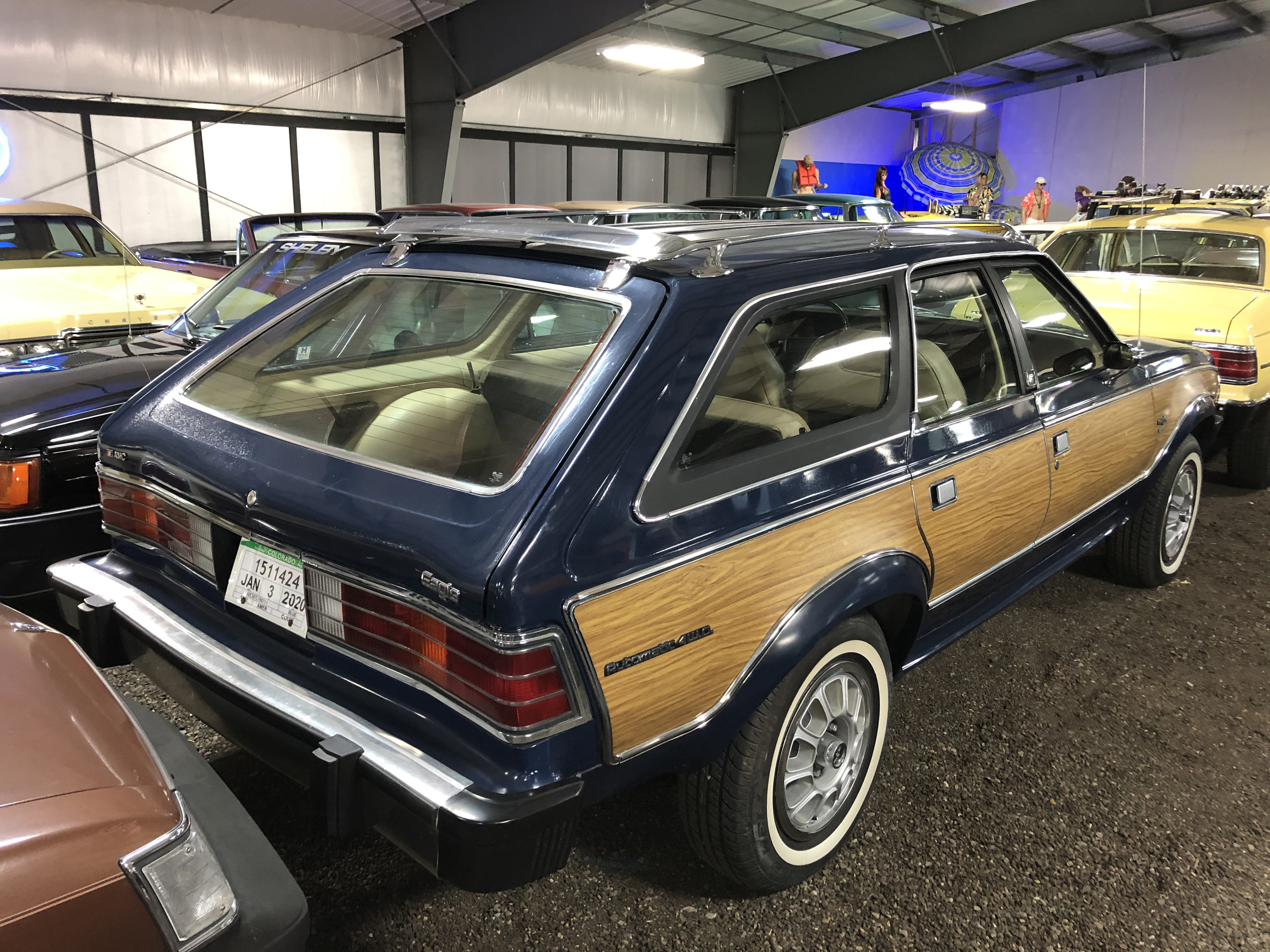
1980 AMC Eagle Limited wagon

Based on the AMC Concord, the 1980 AMC Eagle was introduced in August 1979 and available as a four-door sedan and station wagon, as well as a coupe. Standard equipment included power steering and power front disc and rear drum brakes, as well as 15-inch road wheels with fiberglass-belted radial whitewall tires. The Eagle came base and upscale Limited trims, both of which carried the same features as the Concord DL and Limited, respectively. A sports package was available only on the two-door and wagon models featuring in addition to "Sport" emblems the following items: Durham Plaid fabric seat trim, leather-wrapped sport steering wheel, P195/75R15 Goodyear Tiempo steel-belted radial tires (which were the first tires made to meet standards for winter tires but intended for year-round use), sport fog lamps, halogen high beam headlamps, dual black remote mirrors, 4X4 sport graphics, black bumpers with nerf strips, black lower body moldings, blackout grille, taillamp paint treatment, side tape stripes, and black moldings on the windshield, rear window, door frames, and B-pillar.

All Eagles came with "Ziebart Factory Rust Protection" that included a five-year "No Rust Thru" transferable warranty. The cars were built using aluminized trim screws, plastic inner fender liners, and galvanized steel in every exterior body panel, and the body went through an epoxy-based primer bath (up to the window line). Eagles were backed by the AMC Buyer Protection Plan, a 12-month/12,000 mi (19,312 km) warranty on everything except the tires.

The drivetrain consisted of one engine, the 258 cu in (4.2 L) straight-six, in conjunction with a three-speed automatic transmission (a version of Chrysler's A998), with Dana 30 and Dana 35 differentials. All 1980 Eagles came standard with a permanent 4WD system that employed a New Process 119 transfer case with a viscous fluid coupling that allowed the drive system to operate on wet or dry pavement without causing undue suspension and drivetrain wear. Due to its rugged undercarriage, two trailer-towing packages were available for handling trailers weighing up to 3,500 lb (1,588 kg). The top package included a weight distributing (equalizing) tow hitch, seven-connector wiring harness, wiring, auxiliary transmission oil cooler, 3.54 axle ratio, and also required both the optional heavy-duty battery and automatic load-leveling air shocks.

The 1980 Eagle's appearance differed from the Concord's in that the bodies were raised 3 in (76 mm) further off their suspension to afford better ground clearance. To fill in the increased visual space between the tires and wheel wells, AMC used durable Kraton (polymer) plastic wheel arch flares that flowed into rocker panel extensions. The grille was similar to the 1980 Concord's, with horizontal bars spaced slightly further apart and the Eagle emblem mounted to the left side. Because coupes and sedans carried Concord DL equipment as standard, they also carried the Concord DL coupe and sedan roof treatments, featuring vinyl roof coverings and opera windows. However, bumpers were mounted closer to the body than those fitted on Concords due to the Eagle having been classified by the United States Environmental Protection Agency as a light truck. This made Eagles exempt from regular passenger-car regulations that mandated both front and rear bumpers sustain a 5 mph (8 km/h) impact with no damage. As on the Concord, black plastic end caps were featured on the 1980 model year Eagle bumpers.

Demand for the innovative 4WD models caused AMC to discontinue the slow-selling Pacer in December 1979, to allow for increased Eagle production capacity at its assembly facility in Kenosha, Wisconsin. The 4WD components beneath a conventional car made the Eagle popular in regions with snow, and AMC made the Jeep connection explicit creating "an early crossover" vehicle. Production for the 1980 model was: 9,956 four-door sedans, 10,616 two-door sedans, and 25,807 station wagons, for a total of 45,379 units. The Eagle models helped AMC increase total car production to 199,613 units, or 18% higher than the previous year.

==== 1981 ====
Changes to the standard (Series 30) Eagle lineup for the 1981 model year were significant. The General Motors- sourced 151 cu in (2.5 L) "Iron Duke" inline-four engine became standard equipment, as AMC's 258 cu in (4.2 L) I6 became optional. The I4 engine was only available with the manual transmission in the Eagle sedans and wagons. The AMC inline-six was redesigned to produce more low-end torque, as well as made smoother running, more economical, and required less maintenance. The engineering improvements to the AMC engine also reduced its weight by 90 pounds (41 kg) to 445 lb (202 kg), thus making it "the lightest in-line Six in the domestic industry".

All Eagles took on a new plastic egg-crate-style grille divided into 24 squares at the front. The Eagle emblem was relocated to the grille header bar. Bumpers were updated so their end caps flowed smoothly into the Kraton plastic wheel arches and rocker panel trim. The Sport package, carried over from 1980 on all three body styles, used the Spirit's hood and grille header bar trims starting with the 1981 model year. At 183.2 in (4,650 mm), the Series 30 Eagle was also three inches (76 mm) shorter than the previous year.

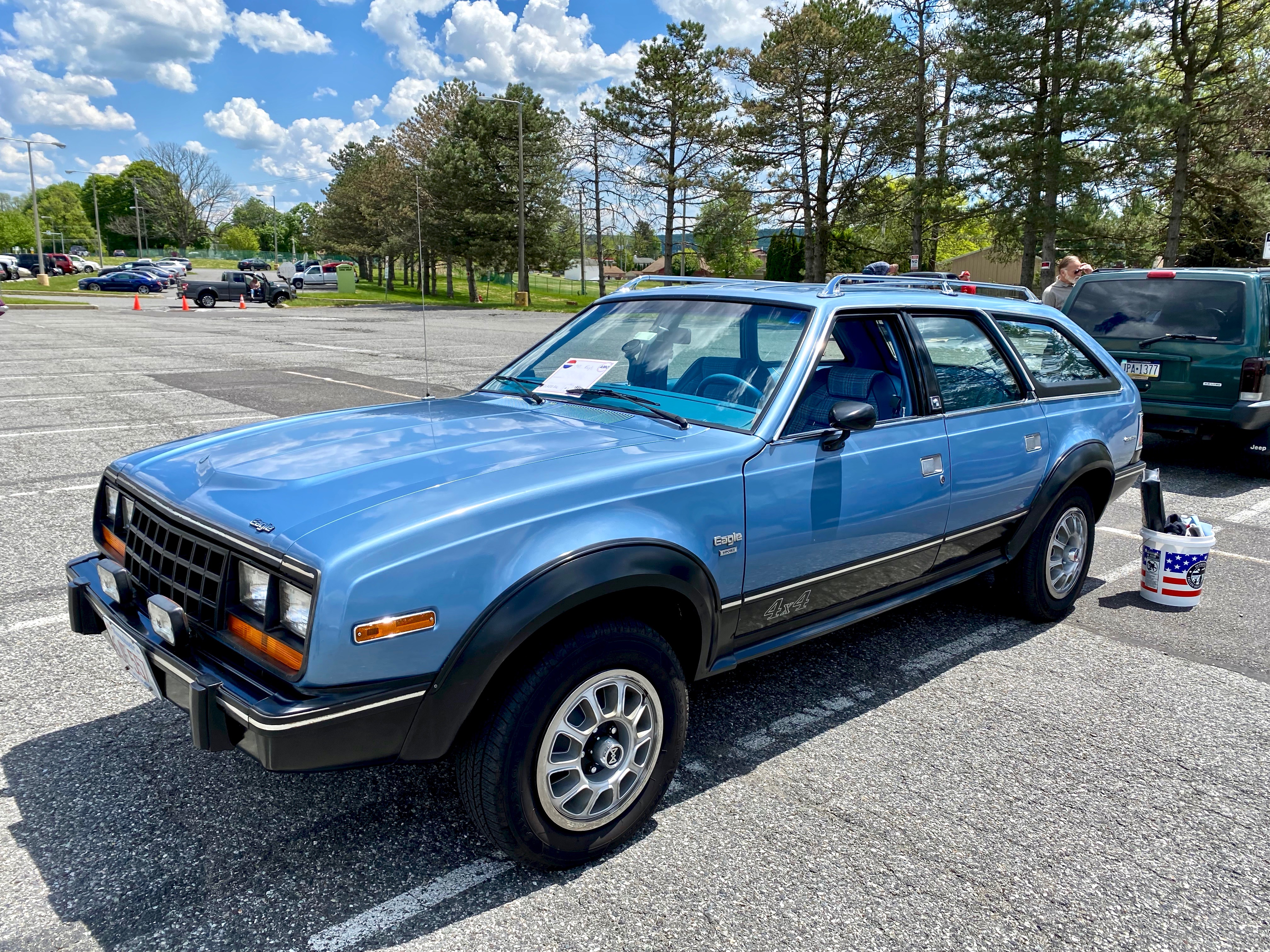
1981 AMC Eagle Sport station wagon

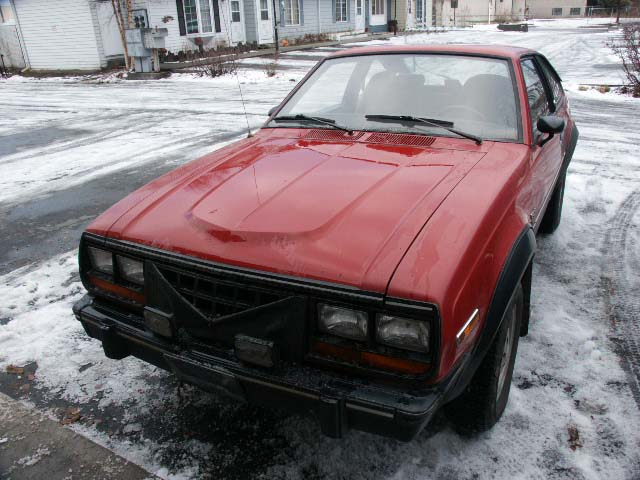
1981 AMC Eagle SX/4 liftback

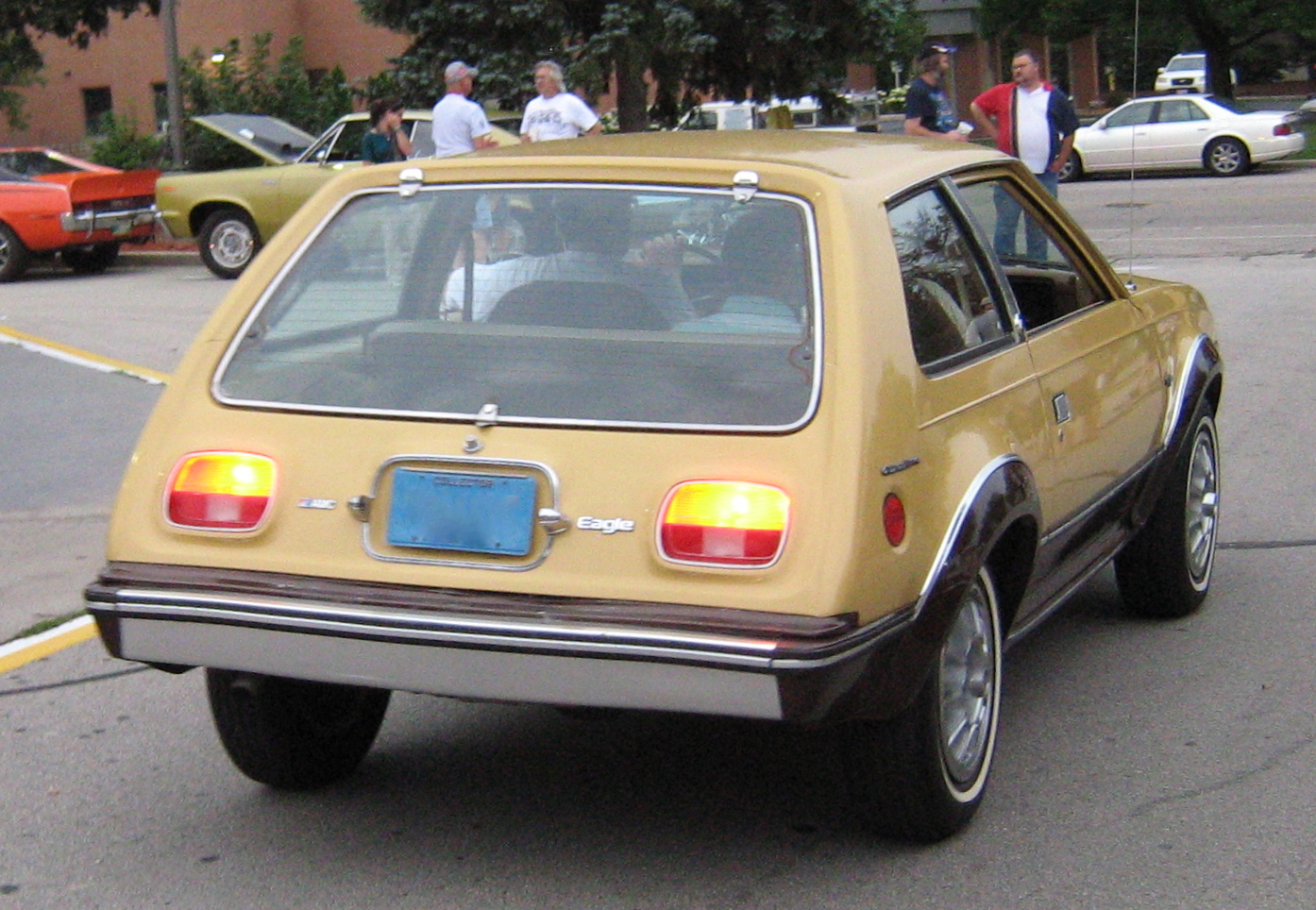
AMC Eagle Kammback

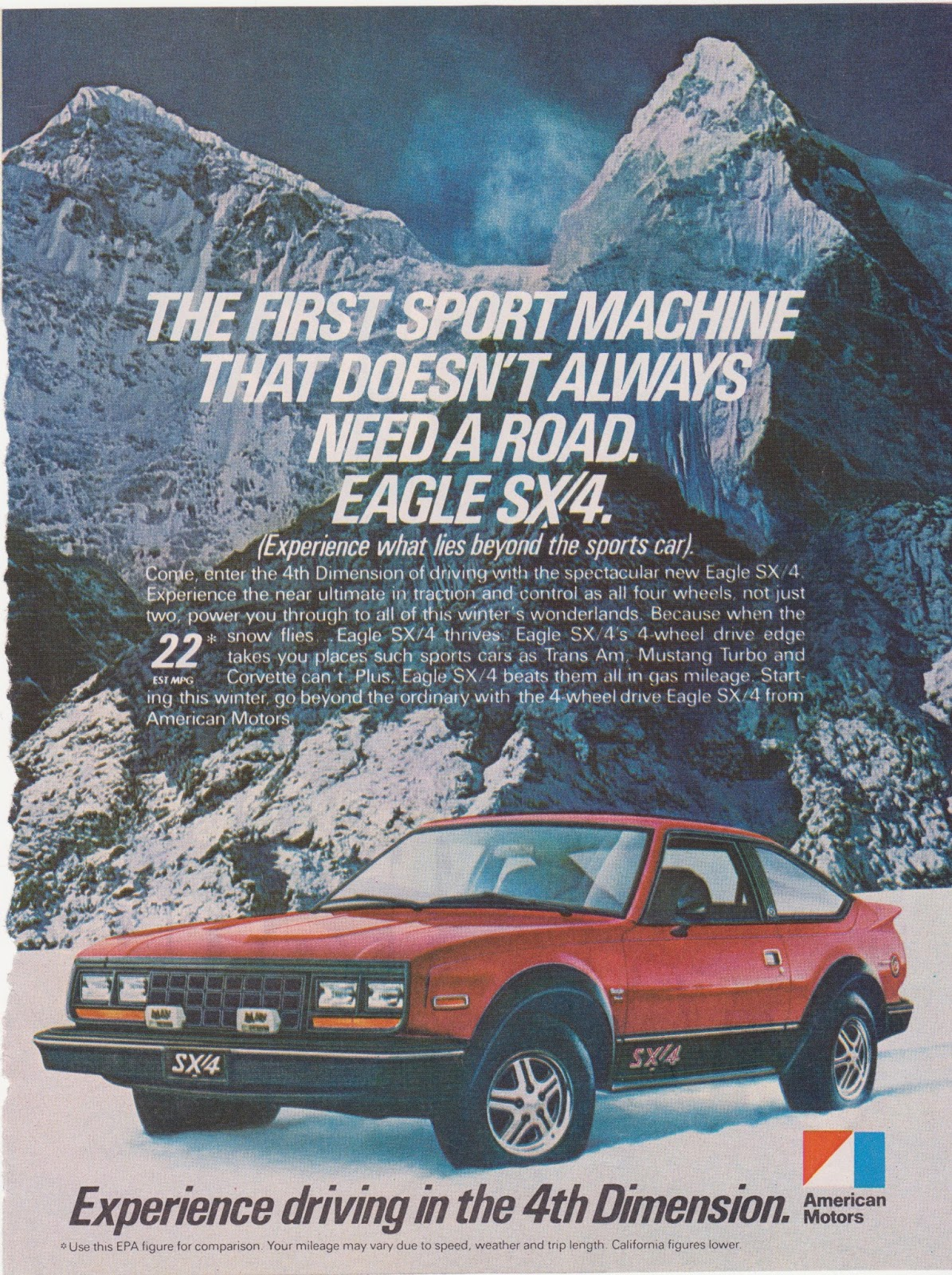
1981 AMC Eagle SX/4 ad, "Doesn't Always Need a Road"

Two smaller subcompact models, the AMC Eagle Kammback, based on the AMC Spirit sedan (née Gremlin), and the sporty Eagle SX/4, based on the Spirit liftback, debuted as "Eagle Series 50" models. The Kammback and SX/4 came standard with GM's 151 cu in (2.5 L) "Iron Duke" four-cylinder engine, four-speed manual transmission, and power steering. The Series 50 Eagles reflected the styling updates that the larger Series 30 models showed for 1981. The SX/4 model was available with a Sport package, as well. "Billed as 'the sports car that doesn't always need a road', the SX/4 two-door hatchback had a sporty look, but hardly qualified as a sports car." The SX/4 has also been reviewed as "a car decades ahead of its time, it offered a sports car body with increased ground clearance and a four-wheel drive powertrain, creating an entirely new automotive genre overnight."

At the beginning of the model year, all Eagles carried over the new-for-1980 permanent all-wheel drive system with a viscous fluid coupling that protected the suspension or driveline components from wear during dry pavement use. A "Select Drive" option, which allowed the Eagle to run in two-wheel-drive (RWD) mode and be switched to four-wheel-drive via a dashboard switch, was offered as a mid-year fuel economy measure. The Select Drive system required the vehicle to be stationary when switching between two-wheel and four-wheel-drive.

Road tests by Gary Witzenburg in Popular Mechanics described the 1981 "Sport" model station wagon as "Snowbird Supreme" after driving it in Detroit's worst winter weather and noting the numerous improvements that were incorporated for the new model year building on the AMC Eagle's "soundness of design and originality of its concept."

A road test by Car and Driver of the new Eagle SX/4 Sport reported that since it goes where most cars find impossible, it "doesn't require pavement to be fun."

Marketing of the new SX/4 highlighted experiencing what lies beyond the sports car. The advertising was about how the car looked, and with the four-wheel-drive feature, AMC's objective was to establish a new market niche: the off-road sports car. Given AMC's meager advertising budget, most owners purchased them not as sports cars, but to allow them to go through mud and snow. Reviews in the early 2020s have described it as a "sporty crossover hatchback, built 25 years ahead of its time". The new model was yet another response to the "many times the odds were stacked against this bold, little automaker from Kenosha, Wisconsin, and how they just kept coming up with new attempts to do things in a novel way." The SX/4's design has been described as simply attractive and successful because it had no polarizing features.

Production for the 1981 model year was 5,603 Kammbacks, 17,340 Liftbacks, 2,378 two-door sedans, 1,737 four-door sedans, and 10,371 station wagons for a total of 37,429 units.

==== 1982 ====
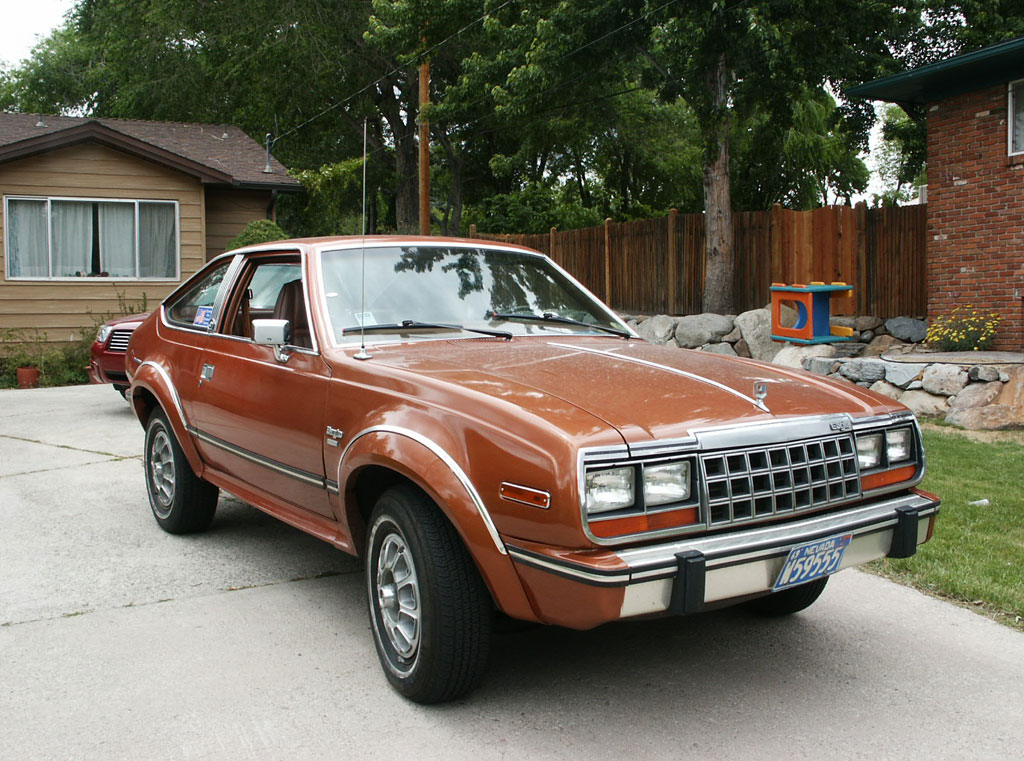
1982 AMC Eagle SX/4

New low-drag disc brakes were featured as standard equipment. A five-speed manual transmission joined the options list. The optional automatic transmission received wider gear ratios for better fuel economy. All received as standard equipment the "Select Drive" system that could be changed between all-wheel drive and two-wheel drive for a potential increase in fuel economy. The system put the front axle and prop shaft into the gas-saving freewheeling mode from the driver's seat. The Series 30 sedan was no longer available with the Sport package.

Even with the choice of two wheelbase versions and five body styles, the most popular model was the wagon with 20,899 built out of total Eagle production of 37,923 for the 1982 model year. Production of the other available body designs were: 520 Kammbacks, 10,445 Liftbacks, 1,968 two-door sedans, and 4,091 four-door sedans.

==== 1983 ====
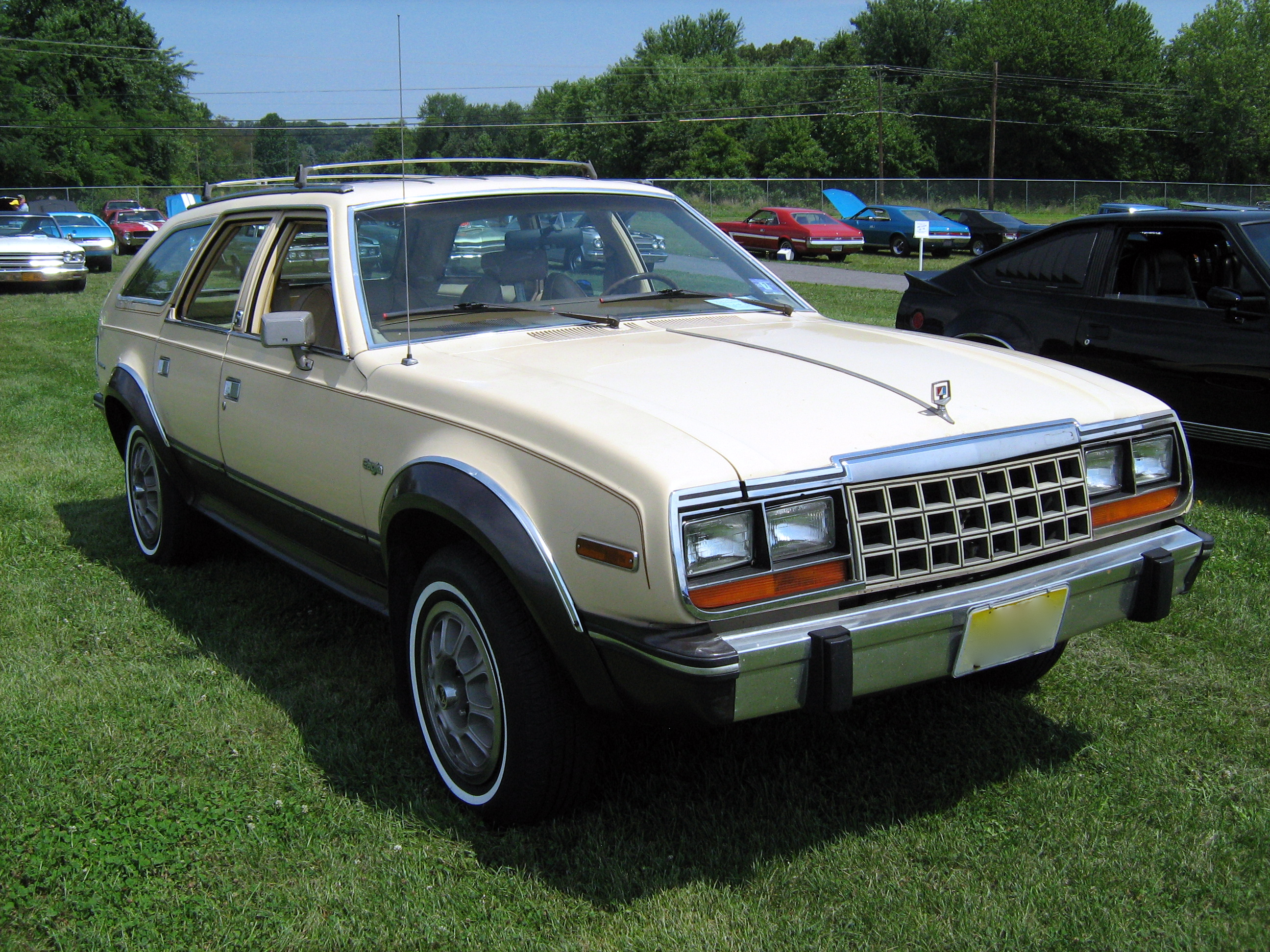
1983 AMC Eagle wagon

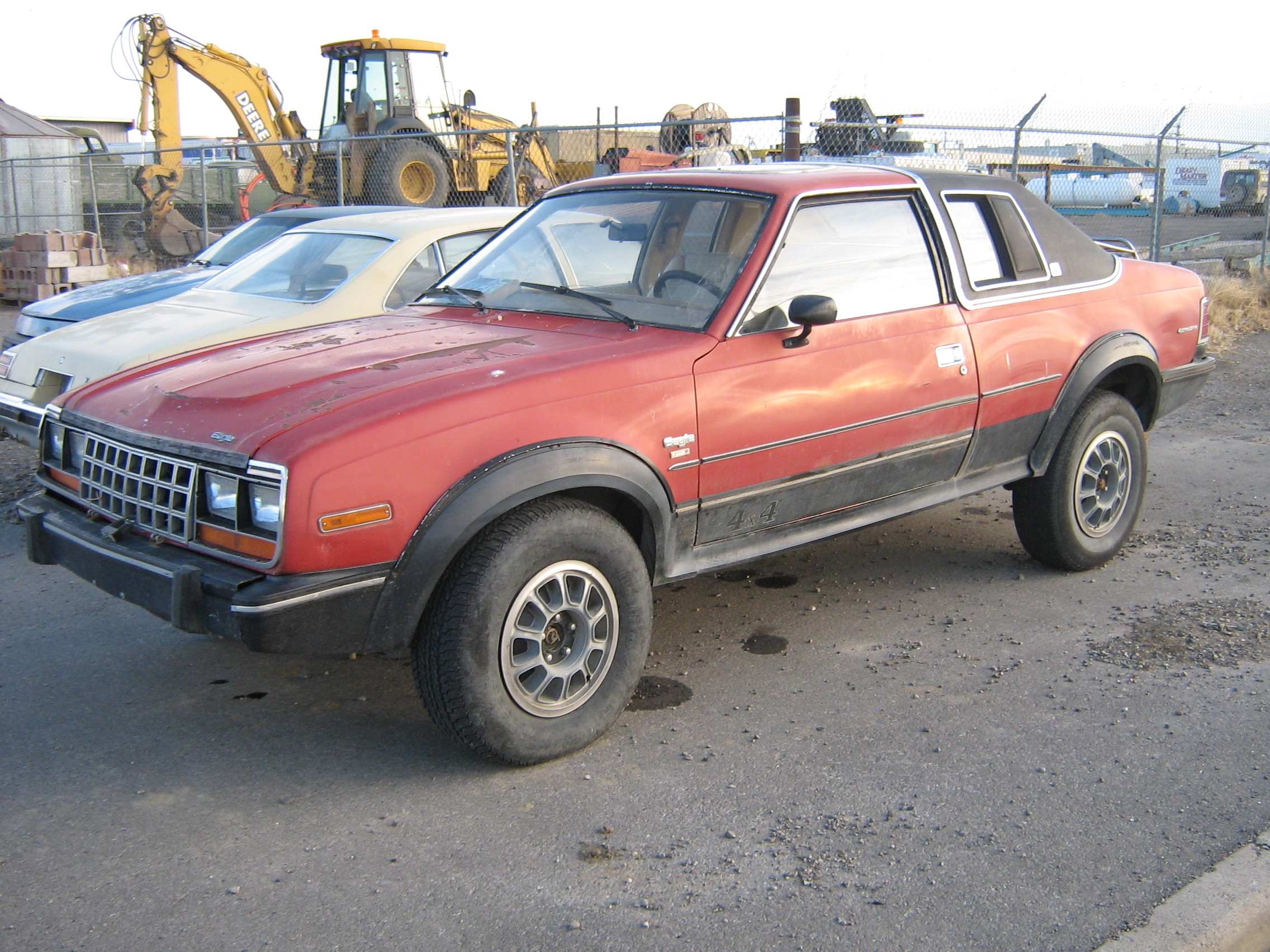
AMC Eagle 2-door sedan

Few changes were seen for the 1983 model year. The Series 50 Eagle Kammback and Series 30 Eagle two-door sedans were both dropped from the line, due to slow sales. The Series 30 Eagle sedan was no longer available in the Limited trim, leaving only the base model in the Eagle sedan line. The Series 50 SX/4 and Series 30 wagon continued unchanged. These measures reduced costs by streamlining their processes reducing production variations, and therefore, complexity.

Starting in February 1983, the AMC 150 cu in (2.5 L) I4 theoretically replaced the GM Iron Duke engine in the Eagle as the standard engine, though the installation rate is unknown. The 258 cu in (4.2 L) I6 was improved for better performance by increasing the compression ratio to 9.2 to 1 (from the previous 8.2 to 1), as well as a fuel feedback system, a knock sensor, and the CEC; thus allowing the continuing use of regular-grade fuel.

A long-term road test by Popular Mechanics began with the editors describing that the "Eagle is best when working hard" and "you can feel the tremendous traction" of its big all-weather tires in four-wheel drive giving "a great feeling of security."

Production was: 2,259 Liftbacks, 3,093 four-door sedans, and 12,378 station wagons for a total of 17,730 units in 1983.

==== 1984 ====
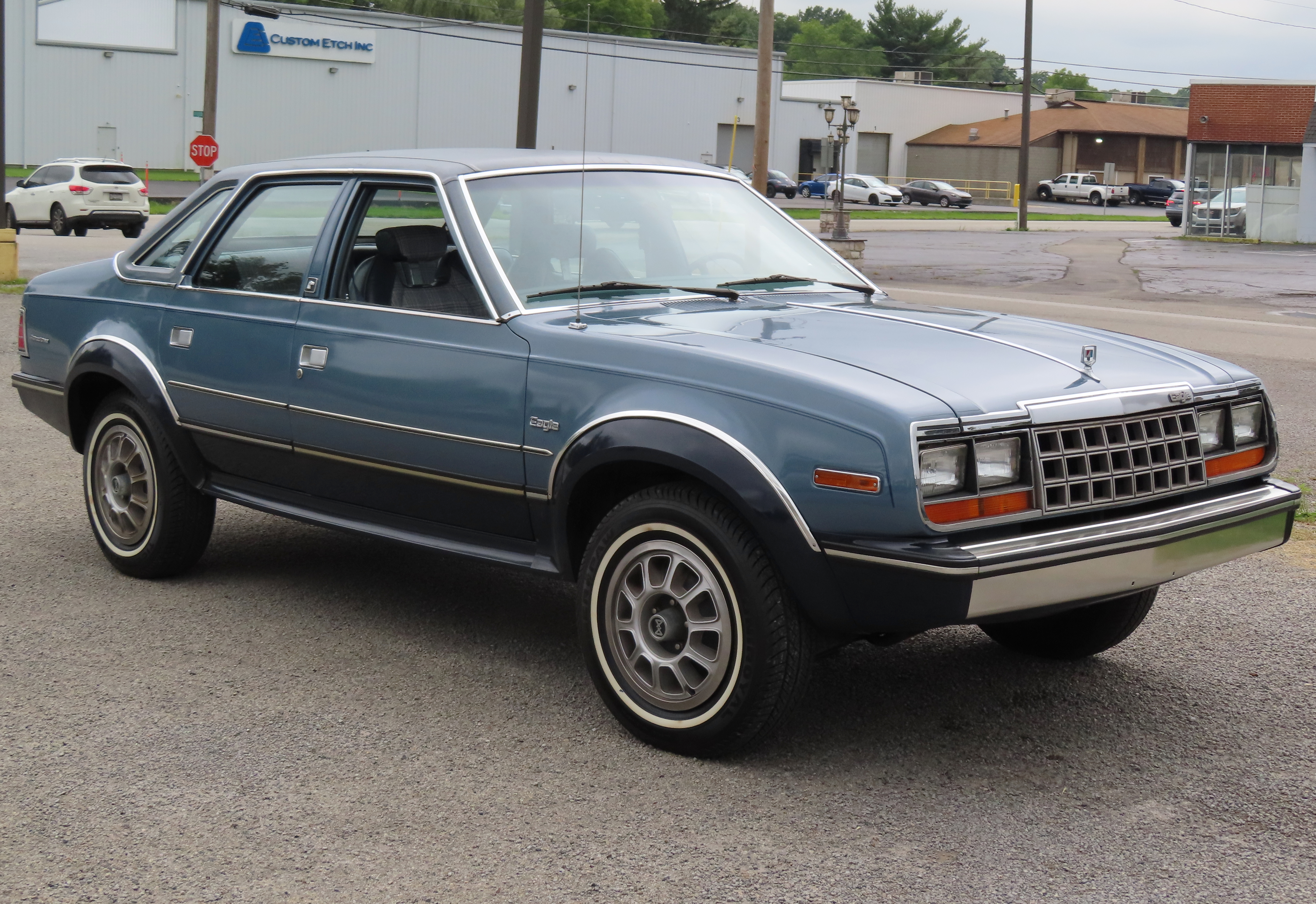
AMC Eagle 4-door sedan

The Series 50 SX/4 was no longer available with the 1984 model year. The lineup now consisted of the base Series 30 Eagle sedan and wagon as well as the Limited wagon. The base wagon was available with the Sport option trim package.

For 1984, the popular 258 cu in (4.2 L) I6 was optional in place of the 150 cu in (2.5 L) AMC I4. The four-cylinder engine was installed in only 147 Eagles, but this still allowed AMC to advertise its fuel economy of 24 mpg_{‑US} (9.8 L/100 km; 29 mpg_{‑imp}) city and 30 mpg_{‑US} (7.8 L/100 km; 36 mpg_{‑imp}) highway with the four-speed transmission and 32 mpg_{‑US} (7.4 L/100 km; 38 mpg_{‑imp}) with the five-speed on the highway. The Select Drive system was redesigned to allow Shift on the Fly. (Prior model-year Eagles required two hands to operate the shifting switch, making it difficult, if not impossible, to change while the car was in motion.)

All Eagle models were now assembled in AMC's original factory in Brampton, Ontario, Canada because the automaker's main Kenosha plant was used for the Renault Alliance and Encore models.

Production for the 1984 model year was: 4,241 four-door sedans and 21,294 station wagons totaling 25,535.

==== 1985 ====
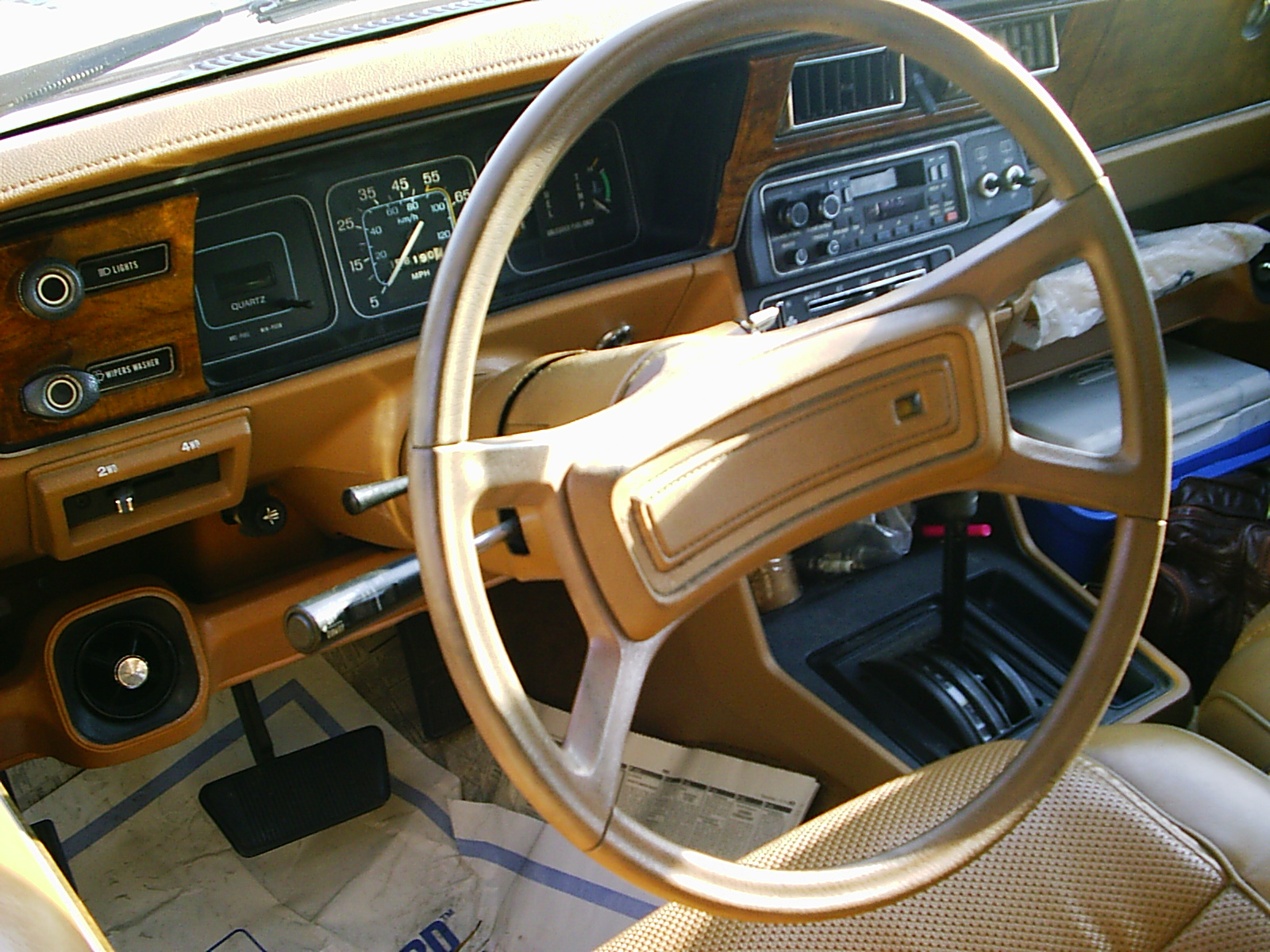
AMC Eagle's "Shift on the Fly" dashboard switch mounted near the steering column

Exterior styling was slightly revised as all models used the "power bulge" hood, seen previously on the 1981 through 1983 Eagle Series 50 models. The grille header bar and hood ornament/trim strip were deleted in the process. "Shift-on-the-Fly" capability was added to the Select Drive 4-wheel-drive system as standard equipment. A new key-fob-activated infrared remote keyless system with power locks was newly available as an option. A digitally tuned AM/FM/cassette radio with a built-in power amplifier and four coaxial speakers was also introduced.

The standard powertrain was now the previously optional five-speed manual, with the wide-ratio three-speed automatic transmission as a popular option. The AMC 258 I6 became standard. However, Eagle sales began to drop as AMC was no longer promoting the models. Advertising was limited to dealer signage and even the 1985 sales brochure noted the Eagle's history highlighting the introduction in 1980 of the full-time 4WD and the 1982 premiere of the "Select Drive" system.

American Motors was no longer aggressively marketing the Eagle line and production for the 1985 model year decreased to 2,655 four-door sedans and 13,335 station wagons, for a total of 16,990 units.

==== 1986 ====
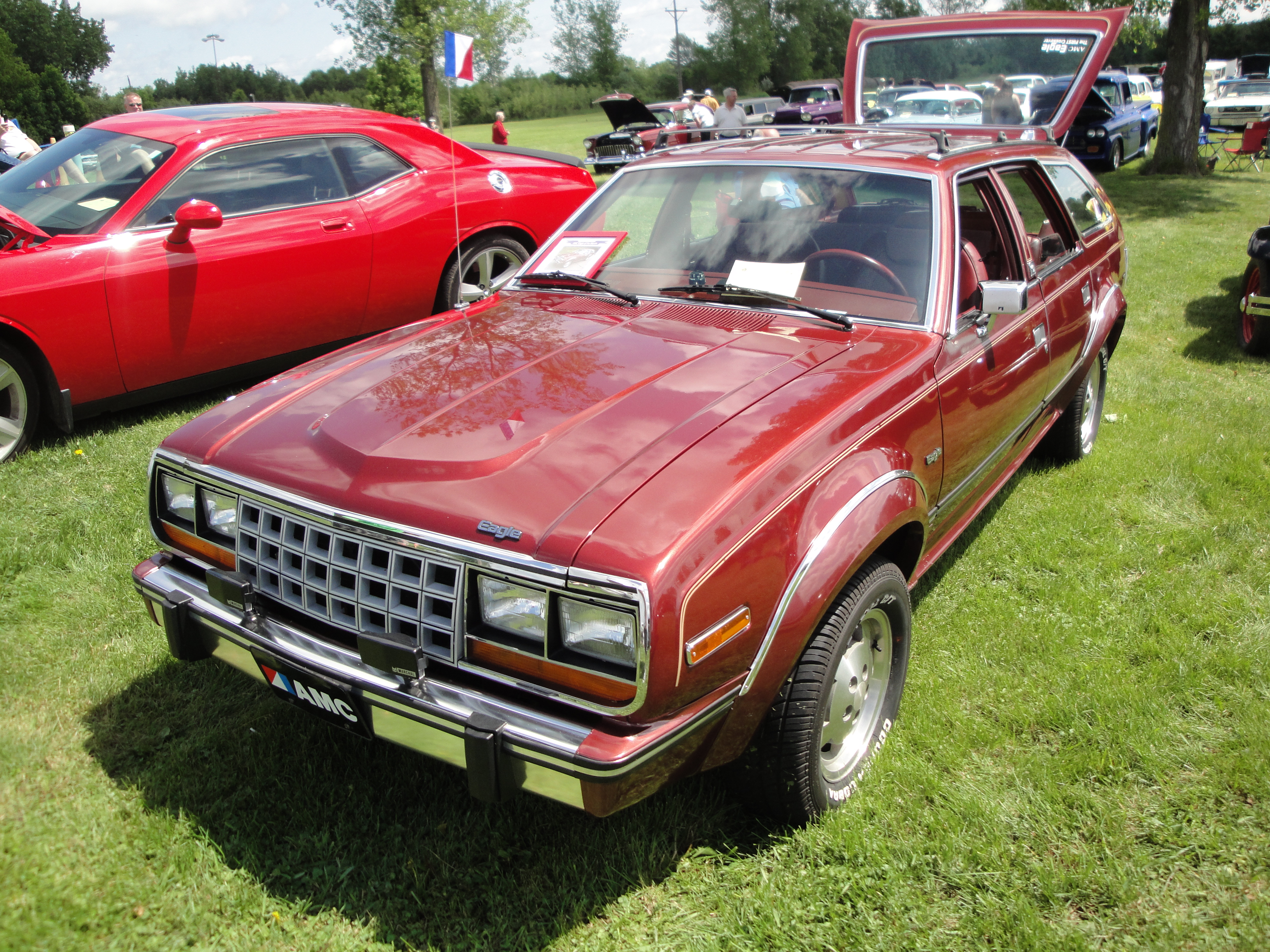
1987 AMC Eagle wagon

American Motors introduced the open differential Model 128 transfer case for the Eagle. The automatic transmission no longer had a lockup torque converter. Eagle sales would drop beneath the 10,000 annual unit mark for the first time after the 1986 model year production (and would slide further for its remaining two seasons on the market), as the car was aging due to its seven-season life atop a platform that debuted for 1970.

Production was: 1,274 four-door sedans and 6,943 station wagons, for a total of 8,217 units. The Eagles were now built in AMC's Brampton Assembly in Canada alongside AMC's new Jeep Wrangler.

==== 1987 ====
Though AMC debuted its new fuel-injected 242 cu in (4.0 L) I6 engine for 1987 Jeep vehicles, the new engine did not make it under the Eagle's hood. The 258 cu in (4.2 L) I6 remained the sole engine available in the eight-season-old Eagle sedan and wagon. No major changes were seen on the 1987 Eagle, as American Motors turned its attention to the debut of the imported Renault Medallion. The buyout of the company by Chrysler Corporation took effect officially on 5 August 1987.

Production for the 1987 model year was: 454 four-door sedans, and 5,468 or 4,564 (varies with source) station wagons, for a total of 5,018 to 5,922 (varies with source) units.

==== 1988 ====
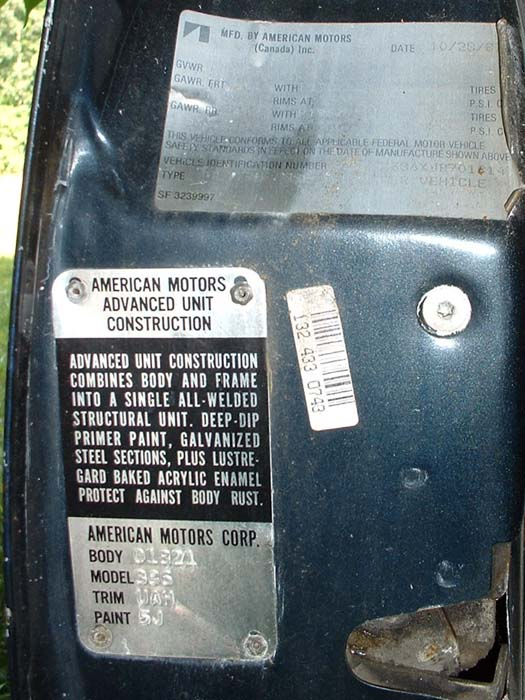
1988 Eagle door plaques continued to use AMC branding

Chrysler took over AMC, but the production of the Eagles continued for the 1988 model year. The car's name was officially changed from AMC Eagle to Eagle Wagon. However, all of the AMC badges, build sheets, and door plaques were carried over. The VIN was no different under the new corporate owner, other than the digit for the year. Although the paperwork that came with the 1988 Eagles continued to indicate that American Motors Canada, Ltd. built them, the company as named ceased to exist, since it became a subsidiary of Chrysler in the buyout, as did all AMC properties. The final car rolled out of AMC's original Brampton Assembly Plant in Brampton, Ontario on 14 December 1987. In its place, production was increased of the Jeep Wrangler that was built there.

The sedan and Limited wagon models were discontinued, leaving the wagon as the only available version in 1988, its final season, and now under Chrysler's ownership. The standard and only 258 cu in (4.2 L) I6 engine was rated at 112 hp (84 kW; 114 PS) and came with either a 5-speed manual or automatic transmission with AMC's Select-Drive system. Standard equipment in 1988 that was previously optional included air conditioning system, rear window defroster, halogen headlamps, AM/FM stereo radio, light group (glove box, dome, and engine lights), and adjustable steering wheel. The following remained optional equipment for the 1988 production: power windows, power seats, power mirrors, radio with cassette player, cruise control, rear window wiper, wood grain side panels, floor mats, headlamp warning buzzer, intermittent wipers, wire wheel covers, and a cold climate group.

Total 1988 model year production was 2,306 units, all station wagons.

== Sundancer convertibles ==
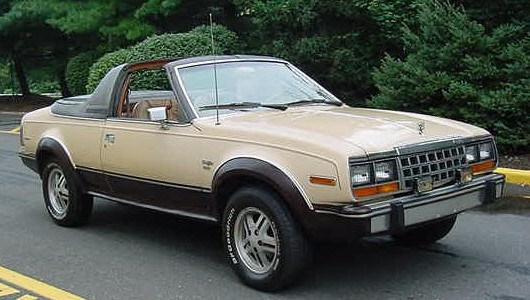
1981 AMC Eagle convertible

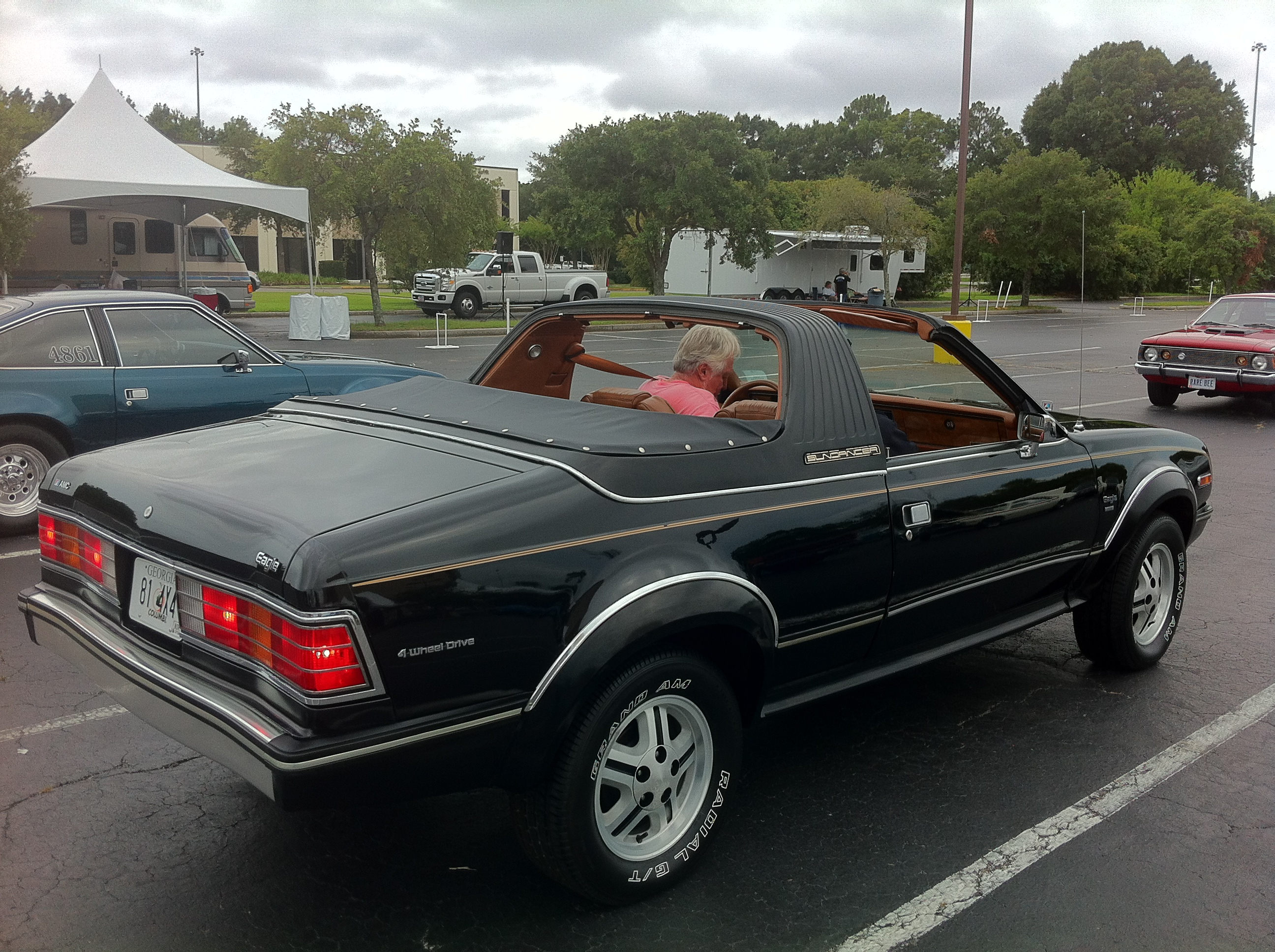
1981 AMC Eagle convertible

Not only is the AMC Eagle described as "the first-ever crossover," but the model line included a convertible body style. In 1980, AMC entered into an agreement with the Griffith Company for a convertible version of its newly introduced Eagle and a prototype version was developed. The cars were marketed during the 1981 and 1982 model years as the Sundancer.

The Eagle's monocoque (unibody) body was reinforced and a steel targa roll bar was welded to the door pillars for passenger compartment protection. The front portion of the roof was a removable lightweight fiberglass hatch, while the rear section of polyvinyl material and the back window folded down and had a boot cover when in the down position. While the convertible versions used standard Eagle components the flexible back section of the top is a custom part.

The conversions were approved by AMC with the cars ordered through select AMC dealers in the customer's selection of options and exterior colors. They were available in the top "Limited" trim level that included leather upholstery. The conversion cost approximately $3,000 and the dealer's list price was $3,750. The conversion was performed by Griffith, which was originally established to build race cars based on the English TVR sports car. Headquartered in Fort Lauderdale, Florida, the cars were shipped from Kenosha for the conversion and then to the ordering AMC dealer. The model did not achieve significant sales and was dropped for the 1983 model year as AMC expanded the Eagle range with the introduction of the sub-compact SX/4 and Kammback versions.

Griffith was also responsible for the similar "Sunchaser" Toyota Celica convertible. These conversions are considered coach convertibles.

== Turbo diesel ==
Another factory-approved conversion was the 1980 turbo-diesel. The 219 cu in (3.6 L) engines producing 150 hp (112 kW; 152 PS) and 224 pound force-feet (304 N⋅m) of torque were supplied by VM Motori. Only about seven are thought to have been manufactured. Two are accounted for in one of the AMC Eagle clubs.

The marketing literature for the conversions noted the cars are equipped with larger fuel tanks, which together with diesel economy and an optional overdrive transmission, would give the cars up to a 1,500-mile (2,414 km) range. However, the $9,000 price tag for the conversion limited the car's market appeal and the turbo-diesel option was discontinued.

== Racing ==
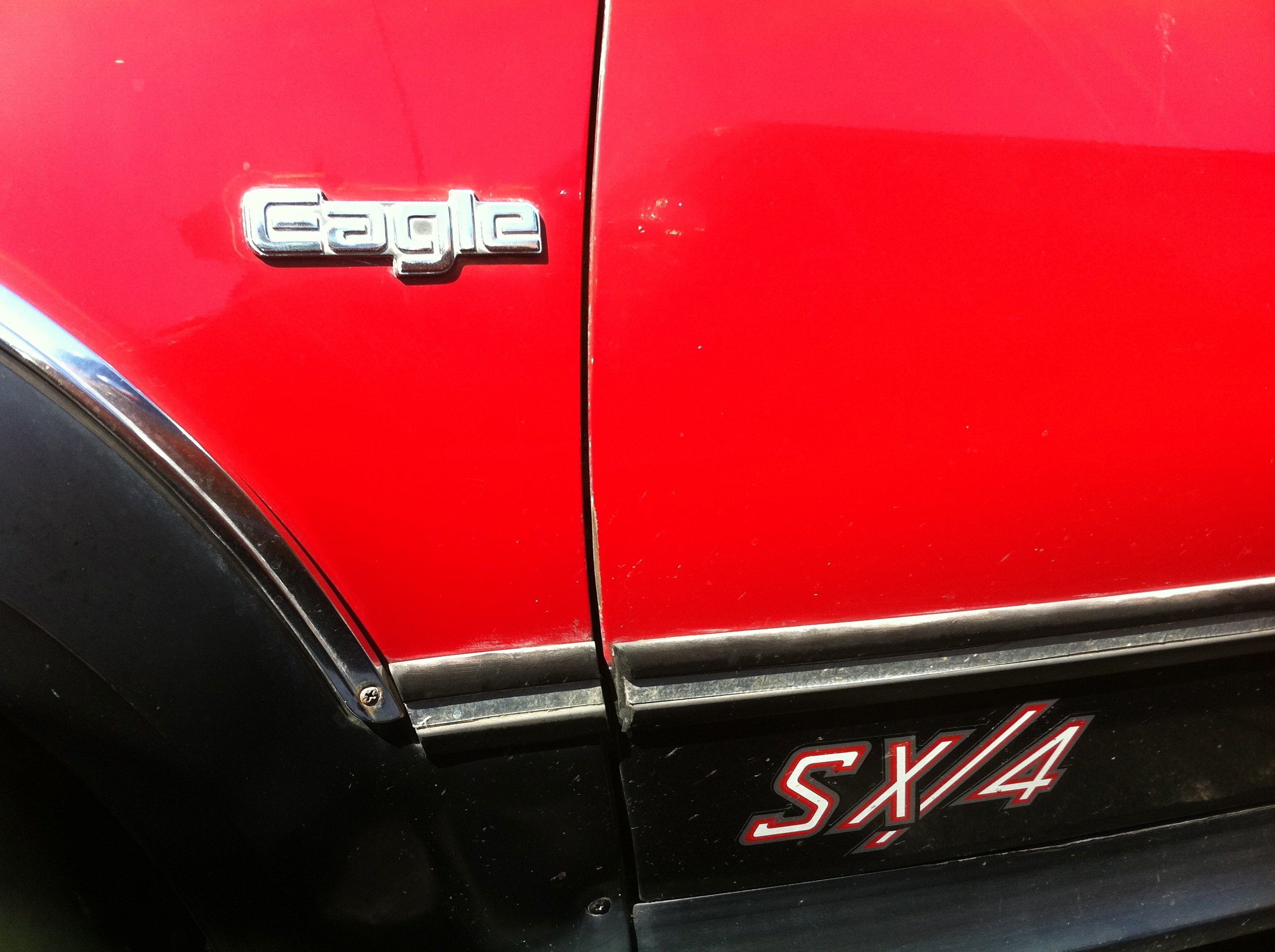
AMC Eagle SX/4 badge

The AMC Eagle was campaigned in the SCCA ProRally racing series, organized by the Sports Car Club of America, a sanctioning body supporting road racing, rallying, and autocross events across the U.S.

=== 1981 ProRally series ===
Drivers Guy Light and Jim Brandt finished the 1981 Northern Lights rally just three minutes behind first place in the Production Class "despite nailing a tree dead center with their brand new AMC Eagle SX/4." Two weeks later at the Chisum Trail rally, the Light and Brandt SX/4 captured fifth place overall, as well as won first in the Production Class, "only the second rally for the Michigan team in their new Eagle." The next event was the Susquehannock Trail rally that saw the first-place winner face "a stiff challenge" from Light and Brandt's SX/4 that captured second less than a minute later. At the Centennial rally held in Monument, Colorado, the Light and Brandt team in their AMC Eagle SX/4 placed third in the Production class and seventh overall. There were three entries with AMC Eagle SX/4s in the Sunriser 400 rally. Light and Brandt won the Production Class and finished seventh overall, followed by drivers Gene Henderson and Jim Kloosterman placing fourth in Production and eleventh overall, but Steve Dorr and Bob Lyle did not complete the race. With only 33 cars finishing out of 71 that entered, the grueling Press-on-Regardless Rally held in Michigan. Light and Brandt placed their SX/4 just two minutes behind the winning team in the Production Class.

The AMC Eagle SX/4 cars captured both second and third place in the 1981 Sno*Drift Production Class rally held on Michigan's snow-covered gravel surface roads in January. Second in the Production Class and sixth overall were Henderson and Kloosterman. "They were robbed of a nearly certain win in the class when the route was blocked on the 12th stage by John Woolf ... [who] was in second place when the car slid on the ice and went straight into a bank tearing off the right front strut and setting the car straight across the road. Henderson was blocked and had to help clear the car from the road before he could continue. They lost two minutes, two places, and a win in the class." Third place Production and seventh overall in this two-day race in Grayling, Michigan, went to Guy Light and Jim Brandt. The finale of the 1981 SCCA ProRally season was held in Reno, Nevada. This is where Light and Brandt drove their AMC Eagle SX/4 to an eight-minute victory over the second-place finisher in the Production Class, as well as placing tenth overall.

The Light and Brandt team ended 1981 with second place in total points for both driver and co-driver, as well as helping put AMC third in the Production Manufacturer standings for the ProRally season.

=== 1982 ProRally series ===
The first event of 1982 was the Big Bend Bash rally in Alpine, Texas, with Gene Henderson and Jim Kloosterman taking Production Class in their AMC Eagle SX/4, "but even that car's four-wheel-drive couldn't save it from trouble in the deep water... They got stuck in the middle of a water-filled wash on stage four and had to be pushed and pulled out." The next event, the 100 Acre Wood rally saw "the Production Class battle was as exciting as the Overall warfare with four Production Class cars finishing in the top ten, all within a minute and a half, after a full night of rallying." The Henderson and Kloosterman team placed their SX/4 third in the Production Class and ninth overall. The AMC Eagle of Henderson and Kloosterman "in the lead ... but that didn't last... On stage 10 the car rolled, ending wheels up on the stage" at the Olympus rally in Tumwater, Washington. At the next event, the Northern Lights rally, the Henderson and Kloosterman SX/4 ended in sixth place in Production and tenth overall. The Budweiser Forest rally held in Circleville, Ohio, put the Henderson and Kloosterman SX/4 in second place for production cars and eighth overall. The Centennial rally was held in Colorado with of many of the rally's stages at a 10,000-foot (3,048 m) altitude, but the Henderson and Kloosterman AMC Eagle SX/4 was just a minute and a half behind the winner with a turbocharged engine in the Production Class and placed seventh overall. The next event, the Tour de Forest rally in Washington State saw the SX/4 of Henderson and Kloosterman finish in fourth place for Production and eighth overall. The SX/4 took second place driven by Henderson and Kloosterman in the 1982 Sno*Drift Production Class in Michigan. "Henderson and his AMC Eagle used the car's 4wd to good advantage and chipped away at [the] lead[er] after the rains started early Sunday morning. The rally ended, however, before Henderson could pull it off" just 24 seconds behind first place.

American Motors was awarded third place among Production Manufacturers for the season.

=== 1983 ProRally series ===
The 100 Acre Wood rally in Salem, Missouri, started the season with Gene Henderson and Jim Kloosterman placing their SX/4 second in the Production Class and seventh overall. At the Budweiser Forest rally in Chillicothe, Ohio, "Henderson was the leader in the class in his AMC Eagle SX/4 through the first two-thirds of the 12-hour rally... Some seven stages from the end, Henderson's Eagle began to have engine trouble and lost one cylinder". The Nor'wester rally held in Tumwater, Washington, had perfect weather (cold, rain, and 11 stages covered with more than six inches of snow) that "helped Production Class winners [and fourth place overall] Gene Henderson and Jim Kloosterman since, "It was perfect conditions for our 4wd (AMC) Eagle. We love that slop". At the next event, the Olympus International, Henderson and Kloosterman was an early leader, but retired with a blown engine in his AMC Eagle SX/4; however, Gene's son, Garry Henderson, in another SX/4 with co-driver Mike Van Leo, placed second in the Production Class and sixth overall. The inaugural three-day Michigan International rally should have been easy for the AMC Eagle SX/4, but "several of the very sandy stages that would have been to Henderson's advantage were canceled" so with co-driver Jon Wickens, the team finished second in the Production Class and tenth overall. The next event with the SX/4 was the Manistee Trails rally in Michigan, where Henderson and Kloosterman won the Production class and finished fifth overall. At the November Press-on-Regardless rally, Henderson was "dominating things in the early going until a big rock took a bite out of the AMC Eagle's transfer case putting it out of the rally." The Henderson and Kloosterman team finished the 1983 Sno*Drift in third place for Production Class and sixth overall.

For the 1983 season, Henderson and Kloosterman ranked second as drivers, while AMC was third among the Production Manufacturers.

=== 1984 ProRally series ===
There were two AMC Eagle SX/4 entries in the 1984 Press-on-Regardless rally with Gene Henderson and Mike VanLoo's car finishing in third place. At the next event, the Oregon Trail rally in Beaverton, Oregon, also had two AMC Eagles with the SX/4 driven by Gene Henderson and Doug Foster finishing in tenth position.

=== 1985 ProRally series ===
The team of Daniel and Betty-Ann Gilliland took their SX/4 to tenth place, while Bob Lyle and Dan Way in an AMC Eagle finished 37th in the Susquehannock Trail rally held in Wellsboro, Pennsylvania. The Gillilands then went on to finish in seventh place, one of two AMC Eagles that were entered in the Dodge ProRally event in Battle Creek, Michigan. In the next event, the Sunriser 400 Forest rally in Chillicothe, Ohio, where the Gilliland's finished in eighth place.

=== 1986 ProRally series ===
The opening event of 1986, the Tulip 200 Forest rally, had four AMC Eagles racing, with Daniel and Betty-Ann Gilliland driving their SX/4 to fifth place overall, while Dave Sampson and Mike Puffenberger finished in 33rd. The Susquehannock Trail rally included three AMC Eagles, with Wayne and Karl Scheible finishing 32nd overall, while Bob Lyle and Dan Way completed the race in 43rd, both running in the Production Class. The Dave Sampson and Mike Puffenberger team drove their SX/4 to 34th finish in the Sunriser 400 Forest rally.

=== 1988 ProRally series ===
The Susquehannock Trail rally in 1988 saw Bob Lyle and Art Mendolia in their AMC Eagle finish in 29th place overall.

== International markets ==
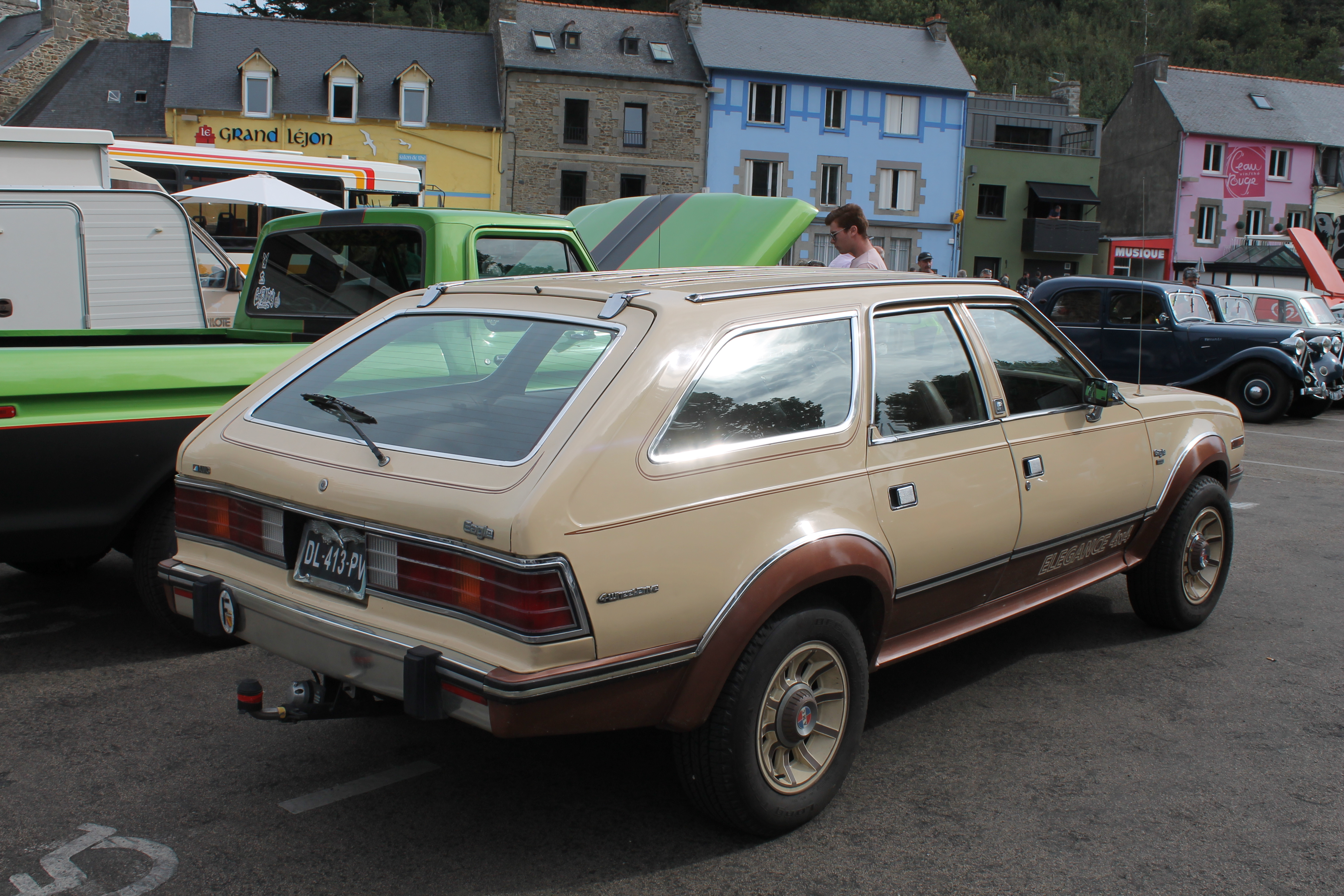
AMC Eagle wagon in France

=== Germany ===
AMC Eagles were imported into Germany by Allrad Schmitt in Höchberg, Würzburg in Bavaria which had been the sole importer of AMC Jeeps since 1977. The company specialized in off-road vehicles and thus the Eagle was imported starting in 1980.

=== Japan ===
AMC Eagles were imported into Japan, in their original left-hand drive, from 1985 to 1989 under the country's new "Action Plan of 1985" which was implemented to simplify Japan's importation processes including motor vehicles. Kintetsu Shibaura Automotive Maintenance Company Ltd. began importing the AMC Eagle Wagon and XJ-generation Jeep Cherokee. The company was absorbed into Kintetsu Motors in 1986 which continued to import the Eagle and the Cherokee until 1989.

=== Switzerland ===
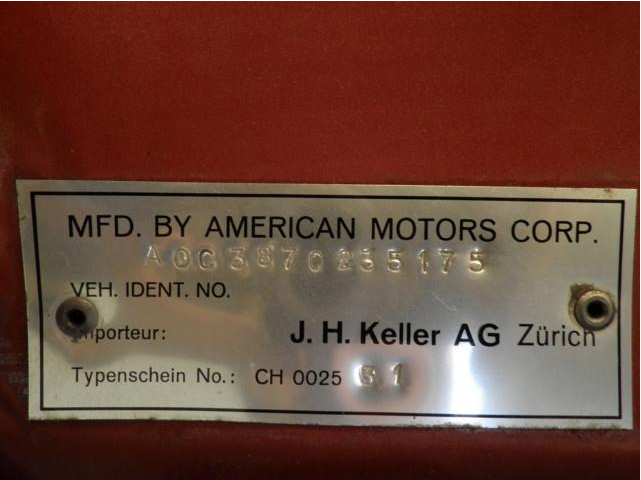
JH Keller VIN Tag approval for Swiss market

The Eagle and other AMC models and Jeeps were imported to Switzerland by J.H. Keller in Zurich. During the 1970s until around 1986, AMC's International Operations exported Pacers, Javelins, Concords as well as Jeep CJs and Wagoneers that were built in the US or Canada.

== Legacy ==
The AMC Eagle "was arguably a decade ahead of its time." It was a passenger car that "pioneered the crossover SUV" category. Introduced in late 1979 for the 1980 model year, it "was unlike anything on the market" and in the 2000s "the somewhat traditional SUV has given way to the 'crossover utility vehicle' ... the market has become saturated with these new crossovers that provide a car-like driving experience with the security of a little more ground clearance and all-wheel drive" making the AMC Eagle "about 30 years ahead of the curve."

The Eagle had character and survival skills and gained a loyal following. They were a precursor to today's crossover models and the "vehicles worked well and sold well." Total production was 197,449 units in one generation.

Although the original AMC Eagle was not produced after 1988, the Eagle brand, as part of the newly formed Jeep-Eagle division of the Chrysler Corporation, would soldier on.

After buying out AMC, Chrysler gained the lucrative Jeep operation, but it was also "saddled with a largely unsuccessful assortment of cars AMC was bringing in from French affiliate and part owner" Renault. The new Jeep-Eagle division included a combination of the Renault-based vehicles, the imported Eagle Medallion and the North American built Eagle Premier, as well as re-trimmed Japanese Mitsubishi models: Eagle Summit, Eagle Summit Wagon, Eagle Talon, Eagle 2000GTX (Canada only), and Eagle Vista (Canada only). A Chrysler-designed vehicle, the Eagle Vision, was added in 1993.

After the AMC-based 4-wheel-drive Eagle wagon was dropped, Chrysler and Eagle officials were busy figuring out which type of vehicles would be best for the new division. The four-wheel-drive sporty Eagle concept would continue in spirit by offering all-wheel-drive optionally on the Mitsubishi-based 1990–98 Eagle Talon, the Canadian-market 1989–91 Eagle Vista wagon, and 1992–96 Eagle Summit Wagon. However, the "Eagle car lineup for '90 differed significantly from the one that bowed in 1987, on the heels of Chrysler's buyout of AMC."

The brand included vehicles from different companies with various characteristics that included economy, sportiness, and luxury. Due to poor marketing, sales never met expectations. Chrysler discontinued the Eagle brand after the 1998 model year.
