= Oxon Hill High School =

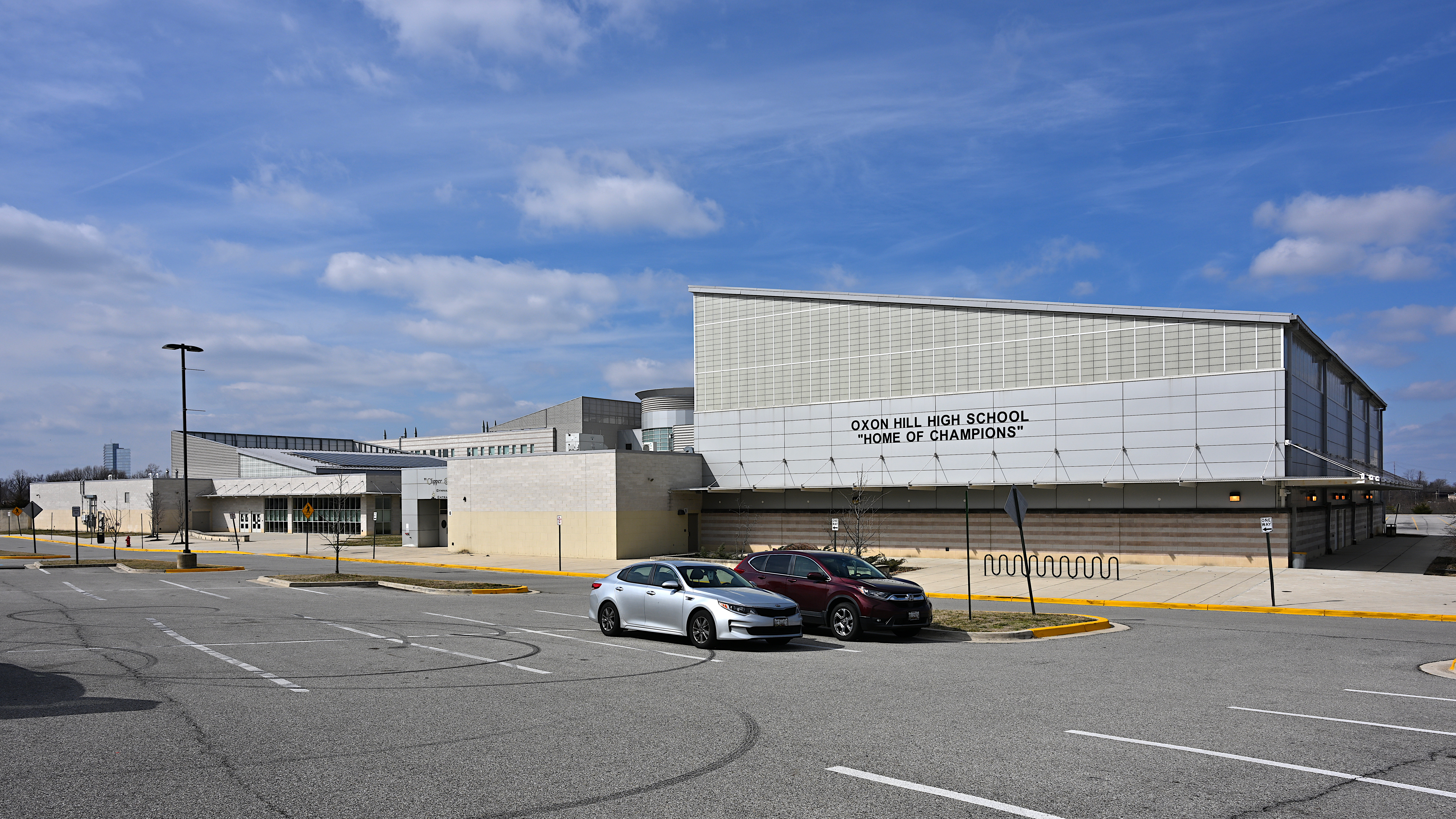

Location
- 6701 Leyte Dr., Oxon Hill, Maryland; 20745; United States; 38°47′50″N 76°59′36″W

Information
- Type: Public Magnet High School
- Mottoes: Navis Semper Naviget, Once a Clipper Always a Clipper
- Established: 1925
- School district: Prince George's County Public Schools
- Principal: Ronald Miller III
- Faculty: 130+
- Grades: 9–12
- Enrollment: 1,553
- Colors: Black and Vegas Gold
- Athletics conference: PG County 3A/4A
- Mascot: Clippers
- Nickname: O-Side, OH
- Rival: Potomac High School(Oxon Hill, MD)
- Yearbook: Clipper Log
- Website: www.pgcps.org/oxonhillhs

Oxon Hill High School (OHHS) is a public senior high school, located in Oxon Hill, an unincorporated area in Prince George's County, Maryland, and a suburb of Washington, D.C. in the United States. The school, which serves grades 9 through 12, is a part of the Prince George's County Public Schools system.

Oxon Hill is one of three schools in Prince George's county to offer the Science & Technology Program (see below), a magnet program with a highly selective admissions process. This program is a "school within a school" with approximately 125 students in each entering class. Overall, the school has approximately 1,500 students spread across the four grade levels. In recent years, the school has suffered persistent overcrowding due to its popular academic programs, extracurricular activities, and location in the burgeoning southern tier of the county.

The school mascot is a Clipper Ship, as chosen through a student contest. The school motto is Navis Semper Naviget (May The Ship Sail Forever).

It serves: portions of the Oxon Hill and Fort Washington census-designated places, as well as all of National Harbor CDP.

== History ==
The Oxon Hill Consolidated School, a union of five elementary schools, started in 1925. The school's first addition came in 1926, with three more in a period between 1928 and 1938 at the site which is currently Oxon Hill Elementary School on Livingston Road.

In 1948, the consolidated school ended and a grades 7 through 12 school was established in a new two-story building, which is currently the Education and Staff Development Center facing Maryland Route 210. The school operated on a split session until John Hanson Junior High School opened. With an expanding suburban population, a larger campus opened in 1959, on Leyte Drive in the Southlawn community. (In the early 1960s the school's zoned attendance area stretched from the District of Columbia line as far south as Piscataway Creek/Bay. In the 1960s/1970s many of these neighborhoods were reassigned to the newly-built Potomac, Crossland, and Friendly high schools). The school's music departments were especially noted, winning awards on local, national, and international levels. During the years prior to desegregation, the student body was nearly all Caucasian, which gradually changed to majority African American (as did the local community). In the 1980s, the school was expanded by adding the magnet program's Science and Technology building.

In 1966 Oxon Hill High School, then serving as a senior high school with grades 10, 11, and 12, was selected as one of the first dozen high schools in the United States to participate in the U.S. Air Force Junior Reserve Officer Training Corps (AFJROTC) program.

The school received some attention in the local media in 1995 after the shooting death of student Charles "Chuck" Marsh while waiting for a bus in front of the school. President Clinton alluded to the case when he made his remark about requiring school uniforms in his State of the Union address.

A complete new 251,700-square-foot (23,380 m^{2}) school facility was scheduled for completion in 2013. The old building was to be demolished. The capacity of the new building is 1,200 students.

== Science and Technology Program ==
The Science and Technology Program (STP), offered at OHHS since 1982, is a highly structured, four-year academic program. Of twenty-eight possible credits, a student is required to obtain a minimum of thirteen credits in specific mathematics, pre-engineering technology, research, and science courses. In grades nine and ten, the program consists of common experiences courses for all students. In grades eleven and twelve, each student must choose coursework from at least one of four major study areas. Students are expected to be enrolled in a full schedule of classes during the entire four-year program. External experiences are possible and encouraged, but must be a direct extension or enrichment of the Science and Technology Program, and have the recommendation of the Science and Technology Center Coordinator prior to approval by the principal.

At the end of tenth grade, students choose one major study area: pre-engineering technology, biological sciences, physical sciences, or science and technology exploration (i.e. computer science). The following course requirements correspond with each area of study:

Pre-engineering technology (PET)
- One advanced technology STP course: electronics/energy systems or production/statics systems
- One drafting and design STP course: engineering or architectural drafting and design
- One specific science elective
- Mathematics through pre-calculus
- Research Practicum

Biological science
- One advanced chemistry course: AP Chemistry or Bio-Organic Chemistry
- AP Biology
- One specific science elective
- Mathematics through pre-calculus
- Research Practicum

H.S.L Physical science
- AP Chemistry
- AP Physics
- One specific science elective
- Mathematics through calculus
- Research practicum

Computer science
- Computer mathematics
- AP Computer Science
- One specific science elective
- Mathematics through pre-calculus
- Research practicum

== Scholarship(s) ==
STP students at Oxon Hill have been recipients of a high number of college and/or military scholarships, grants, and awards since the inception of the program. Scholarship award opportunities for Oxon Hill High School have exceeded twenty-three million dollars ($23,000,000.00) annually. Virtually all STP students enter four-year colleges/universities immediately following graduation.

== Science and Technology Program continuance & certification requirements ==
Students must progress toward, and meet, the Science and Technology Program (STP) certification criteria to remain in the program. This includes extra science and technology-centered classes and a year-long research practicum project completed in the students' senior year. Upon graduation, each student who has met the STP certification criteria is awarded the Science and Technology Program Certification of Completion.

== Notable alumni ==
- O'Brien Alston, NFL linebacker
- Rebekkah Brunson, Women's National Basketball Association player, 5-time WNBA champion
- Palmieri David,
- Lamar Butler, former basketball player for George Mason University
- Derrick Delmore, championship ice skater (World Junior Championships, National Collegiate Championships)
- Derrick Fenner, NFL running back
- Danny Gatton, virtuoso guitarist
- Phil Goss, former professional basketball player and current coach for the Capital City Go-Go
- Jerome Grant, executive chef of Sweet Home Cafe inside the National Museum of African American History and Culture
- Taraji P. Henson, Oscar-nominated and Golden Globe-winning actress and singer
- Mechelle Lewis, member of US track and field women's 4x100 meter relay team in 2008 Beijing Olympics
- Meshell Ndegeocello, singer, songwriter and musician
- Marty Padgett, journalist and author
- Emily Perez, first female minority Command Sergeant Major in history of United States Military Academy at West Point, killed in action, September 12, 2006
- Lawrence Sidbury, NFL defensive end
- Valerie Solanas, radical feminist known for the SCUM Manifesto, and for her attempt to murder artist Andy Warhol.
- Aaron D. Spears, soap opera actor
- Michael Sweetney, National Basketball Association player
- Kriselda Valderrama, politician who represents district 26 in the Maryland House of Delegates
