= Jerome Grant =

American chef

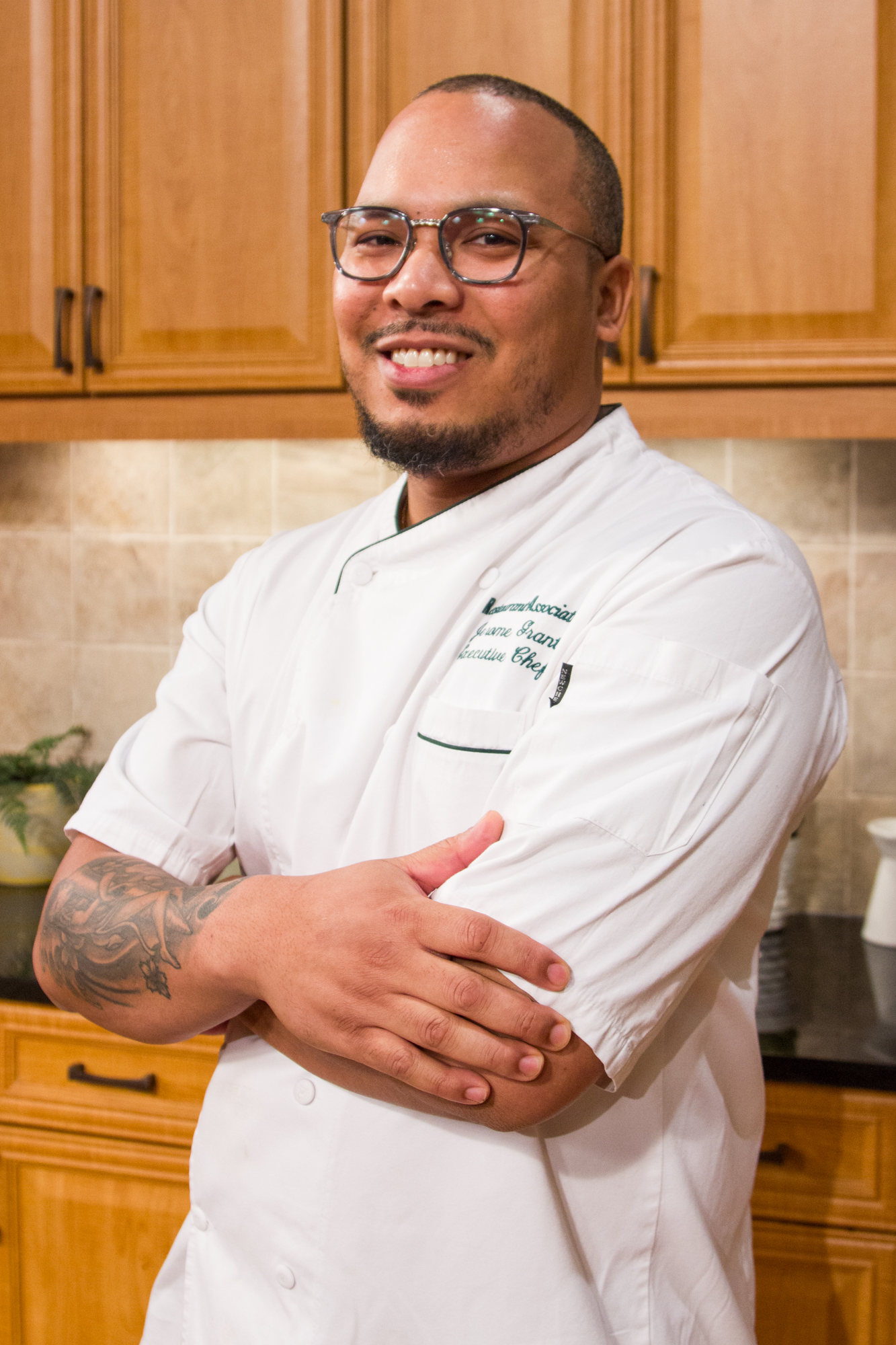
- Grant in 2018
- Born: Philippines
- Education: Pennsylvania Culinary Institute
- Spouse: Sophia Grant
- Culinary career
- Cooking style: American, Native American, African American, Asian American
- Current restaurants
- Jackie Restaurant; Mitsitam Cafe (National Museum of the American Indian); Sweet Home Cafe (National Museum of African American History & Culture)

Jerome Grant is an American chef in Washington, D.C., most notable as Sweet Home Café's inaugural executive chef of the historic National Museum of African American History and Culture and his tenure at the Mitsitam Café of the National Museum of the American Indian. Grant and his recipes have been featured in The Washington Post, Time Magazine, The New York Times, Washingtonian Magazine, Bon Appétit, National Geographic Channel, and Travel and Leisure Magazine among other notable publications. He also appeared on an episode of The Chew that aired on ABC and was a guest chef on The Today Show.

== Early life ==
Grant was born in the Philippines. He spent most of his childhood living in various parts of the United States, including New York, Oklahoma, and California. His mother and stepfather later settled in Fort Washington, Maryland, where Grant attended high school. He graduated from Oxon Hill High School in 2000.

Grant began cooking at a very young age, learning the basics of Filipino cuisine from his mother. He spent his summers with his paternal grandparents in Philadelphia, where he credits his Caribbean-influenced flavors to his father's Jamaican heritage.

== Culinary training and career ==
Grant attended the Pennsylvania Culinary Institute in Pittsburgh, Pennsylvania, graduating with a degree in Culinary Arts in 2002.

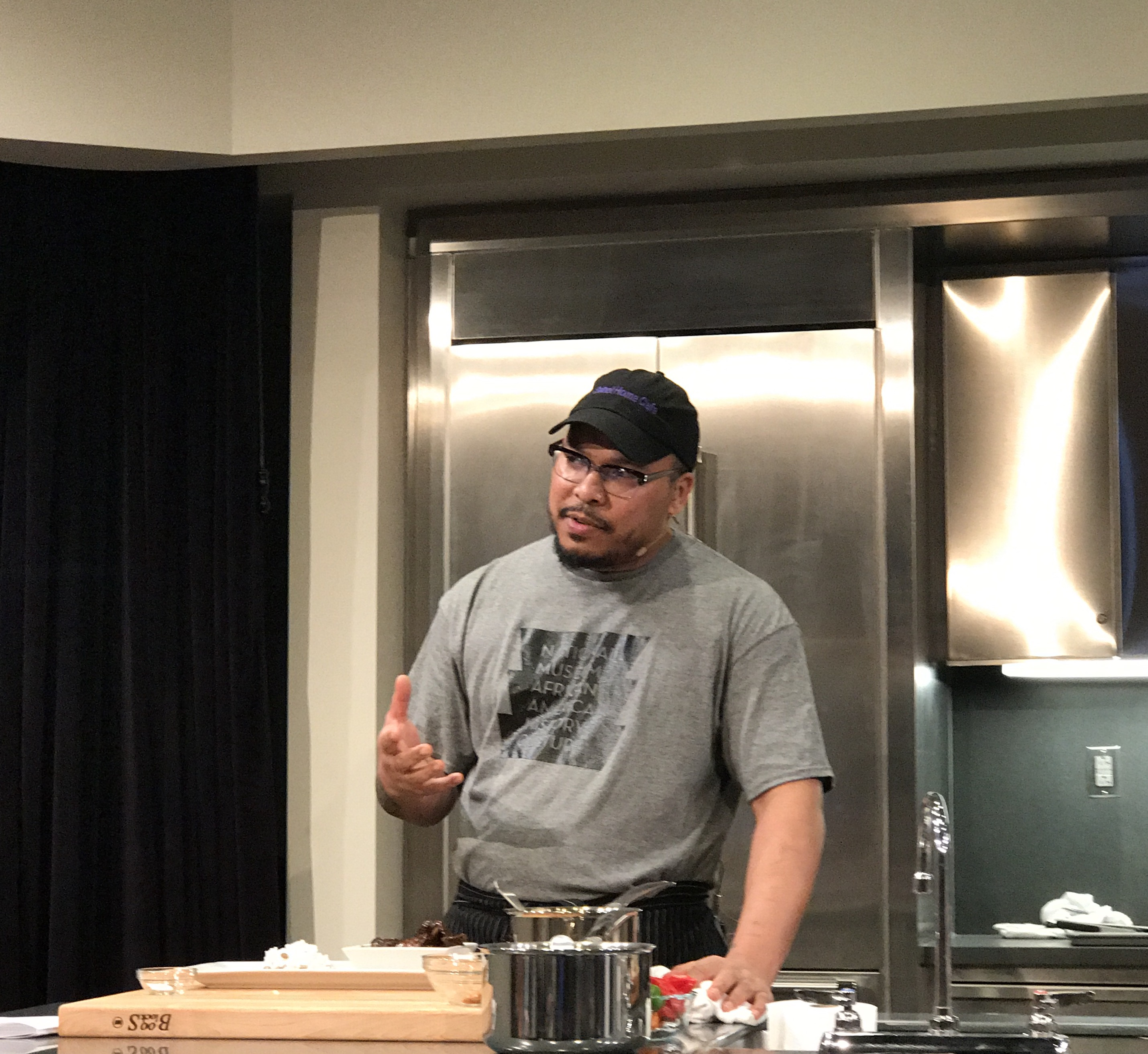
Grant discussing Caribbean influences in African American cuisine during Black History Month at the National Museum of American History.

Upon his graduation, Grant moved to Saint Croix and started his culinary career at the Renaissance St. Croix Carambola Beach Resort and Spa. Shortly thereafter, he was named the 2004 "Best New Chef in Saint Croix" and 2004 "Young and Most Talented Chef of the Virgin Islands" by the Virgin Voice Newspaper. In 2005, Grant opened The Mix Lounge in Saint Croix as part-owner and executive chef.

In 2006, Grant moved back to the United States and was hired as the executive sous chef to open Urbana Restaurant at the Hotel Palomar in Washington, D.C. He stayed for two years before accepting the position as sous chef at the Mitsitam Café inside the Smithsonian's National Museum of the American Indian. In 2012, he played a critical role in the Mitsitam team that received a RAMMY for 2012 Best Casual Restaurant. That same year, Grant represented Team USA at the Global Meat and Livestock Blackbox Challenge in Tasmania, AU, where they received the Silver Certificate.

In 2013, Grant co-founded a lucrative yet short-lived catering business known as Details Catering. Grant served numerous high-profile clients in Washington, D.C., including First Lady Michelle Obama.

In spring 2014, Grant was tapped as the executive chef of Mitsitam Café, where he and his team transcended cafeteria dining on the mall by running a kitchen that emphasizes the importance of cooking from scratch and utilizing whole animals, paying homage to the Native American tradition. He also introduced distinctive ingredients such as chicken gizzards and frog legs to the museum dining scene. Grant is known for his innovative approach of incorporating indigenous techniques and ingredients into distinctive dishes for the modern day palate.

In 2016, Lonnie Bunch "enlisted Mitsitam's executive chef, Grant to help launch the new Sweet Home Cafe" as the inaugural executive chef inside the Smithsonian's National Museum of African American History and Culture.

== Books ==
In 2018, Grant co-authored Sweet Home Cafe Cookbook: A Celebration of African American Cooking alongside Lonnie Bunch and Jessica B. Harris. The book features recipes for the Sweet Home Cafe's most popular dishes and the stories behind each dish as it corresponds to the museum's exhibits. The book chronicles the diaspora of African-American foodways through recipes and details the regional techniques of African-American cooking.

== Awards and recognition ==
Sweet Home Cafe received a 2017 James Beard nomination for Best New Restaurant. Grant received a 2019 James Beard nomination for Best Chef: Mid-Atlantic.

Grant was a recipient of the 2018 StarChefs Rising Star Award for the D.C.-Chesapeake region. He is also featured in Washington Life Magazine's 2019 "Young & the Guest List: 40 Under 40" for his work at the Sweet Home Cafe and in the community.
