= Royal Sonesta Washington DC Dupont Circle =

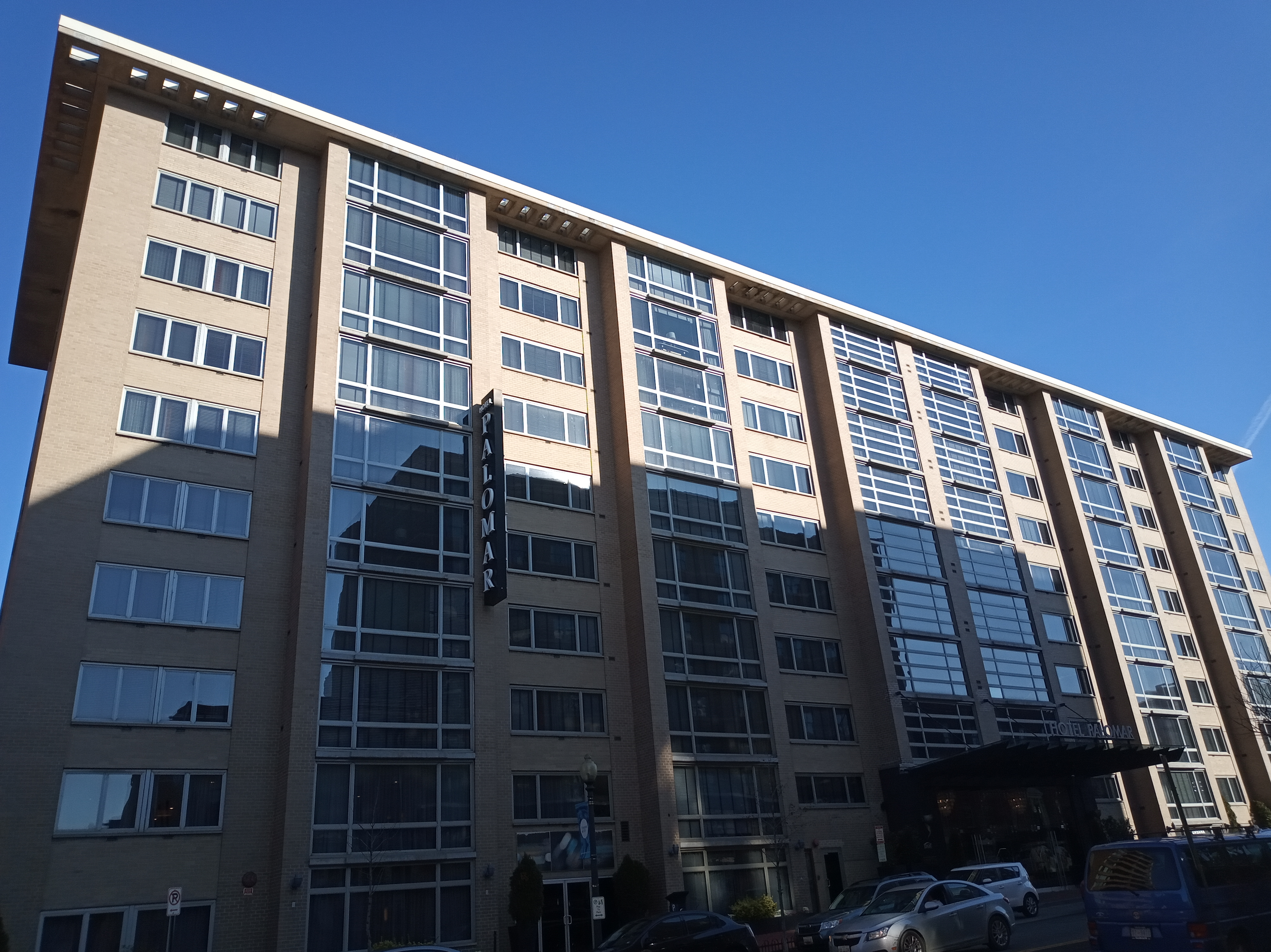
- View of the hotel from southwest.
- Interactive map of the Royal Sonesta Washington DC Dupont Circle area

General information
- Type: boutique hotel
- Location: 2121 P Street Northwest, Washington, D.C., United States
- Coordinates: 38.9098°N 77.0473°W
- Opened: 1967

Other information
- Number of rooms: 335

Website
- https://www.sonesta.com/us/district-columbia/washington/royal-sonesta-washington-dc-dupont-circle

The Royal Sonesta Washington DC Dupont Circle is a 335-room, boutique hotel located at 2121 P Street Northwest in the Dupont Circle neighborhood of Washington, D.C.

== History ==
The Georgetown Hotel opened in 1967. It was constructed by Washington banker Leo M. Bernstein, one of the pioneers in redeveloping the Georgetown neighborhood as a posh residential district.

In 1985, Bernstein sold the property to Omni Hotels, and it became the Omni Georgetown Hotel. Omni sold the hotel soon after to Bethesda-based Nordheimer Brothers Co., but continued to manage the property. In December 1988, Perpetual Savings Bank, which already held a $10 million second mortgage on the hotel, bought the $20 million first mortgage from Connecticut Mutual Life Insurance Co. Perpetual foreclosed on the hotel in 1991 and became the owner, but it failed soon after and went into receivership, causing the hotel to become the property of the U.S. government-owned Resolution Trust Corporation in January 1992.

The RTC sold the hotel at auction in August 1992, with Spanish-based Hoteles Barceló S.A. placing the winning bid of $13.7 million. The hotel was renamed Barceló Washington Hotel. Soon after, Barceló retained Radisson Hotels to manage the property, and it became the Radisson Barceló Hotel Washington.

Kimpton Hotels bought the property in November 2004 for $40 million and temporarily renamed it the Dupont Circle Hotel in July 2005, while it underwent a $32 million renovation that added 34 guest rooms, bringing the total to 335. On August 22, 2006, the hotel became the Kimpton Hotel Palomar Washington DC.

The hotel was sold to the Massachusetts-based Service Properties Trust in 2019 for $141.5 million. That company owns a one-third stake in Sonesta Hotels, and renamed the property the Royal Sonesta Washington DC Dupont Circle on December 1, 2020.
