= Marty Padgett =

American journalist

Image of Martin Padgett

Martin Padgett is an American journalist, historian, and educator.

Born in 1969, Padgett is a native of Washington, D.C., and grew up in southern Maryland before going to college at Duke University.

He edited the news section in Car and Driver magazine for five years and wrote road tests. He also appeared on several national radio television programs including CNN's TalkBack Live and Fox Morning News.

After a short turn in public relations at Mercedes-Benz in Alabama, Padgett moved to Atlanta, where he began writing for publications including Details, Men's Health, Stuff, and AutoWeek. He also worked for AutoTrader before taking on the editorial duties at The Car Connection in 1999. He served as editorial director of the site and others, as a part of Internet Brands Automotive, through 2025.

Padgett earned his Master of Fine Arts (MFA) from the University of Georgia's Grady College of Journalism and Mass Communications. He was named a 2019 Lambda Literary Fellow for nonfiction. He earned a PhD in U.S. Constitutional history from Georgia State University in 2023.

His nonfiction book about Atlanta's LGBTQ civil rights movement, A Night at the Sweet Gum Head: Drag, Drugs, Disco, and Atlanta's Gay Revolution, was published by W.W. Norton in 2021. W.W. Norton also published The Many Passions of Michael Hardwick, a biography of Michael Hardwick that retold the story behind the Supreme Court’s Bowers vs. Hardwick 1986 decision, in June 2025. His upcoming book from Rutgers University Press, The Queer Revolution Was Televised chronicles the impact of TV news on the HIV/AIDS epidemic.

== Publications ==
=== Books and Features ===
The Queer Revolution Was Televised, Rutgers University Press, 2027.

“Object Permanence,” Gravy, fall 2025.

The Many Passions of Michael Hardwick: Sex and the Supreme Court in the Age of AIDS. W.W. Norton, June 3, 2025.

“SCOTUS’ Blow to Trans Rights is History Repeating Itself,” Time, June 18, 2025.

“The Sweet Gum Head: A Place for All Kinds of Radical Queerness.” The Southern Review of Books. June 29, 2021.

“What Is Drag, Anyway?” The Paris Review, August 2021.

A Night at the Sweet Gum Head: Drag, Drugs, Disco, and Atlanta’s Gay Revolution. W.W. Norton, June 1, 2021.

“Before TV, Leslie Jordan was Miss Baby Wipes.” Bitter Southerner, October 2020.

“Your Fried Chicken Has Done Drag,” Gravy, October 2020.

“Underneath the Sweet Gum Tree.” Oxford American, August 2020.

Bobcat : fifty years of opportunity 1958-2008. USA: Motorbooks International. 2007. p. 216. ISBN 978-0-7603-3212-2.

Hummer : how a little truck company hit the big time, thanks to Saddam, Schwarzenegger, and GM. USA: Motorbooks International. 2004. p. 256. ISBN 0-7603-1863-8.

=== Web ===
- Interview transcript on CNN
