= Renault Alliance =

Renault Alliance; Renault Encore; Renault GTA
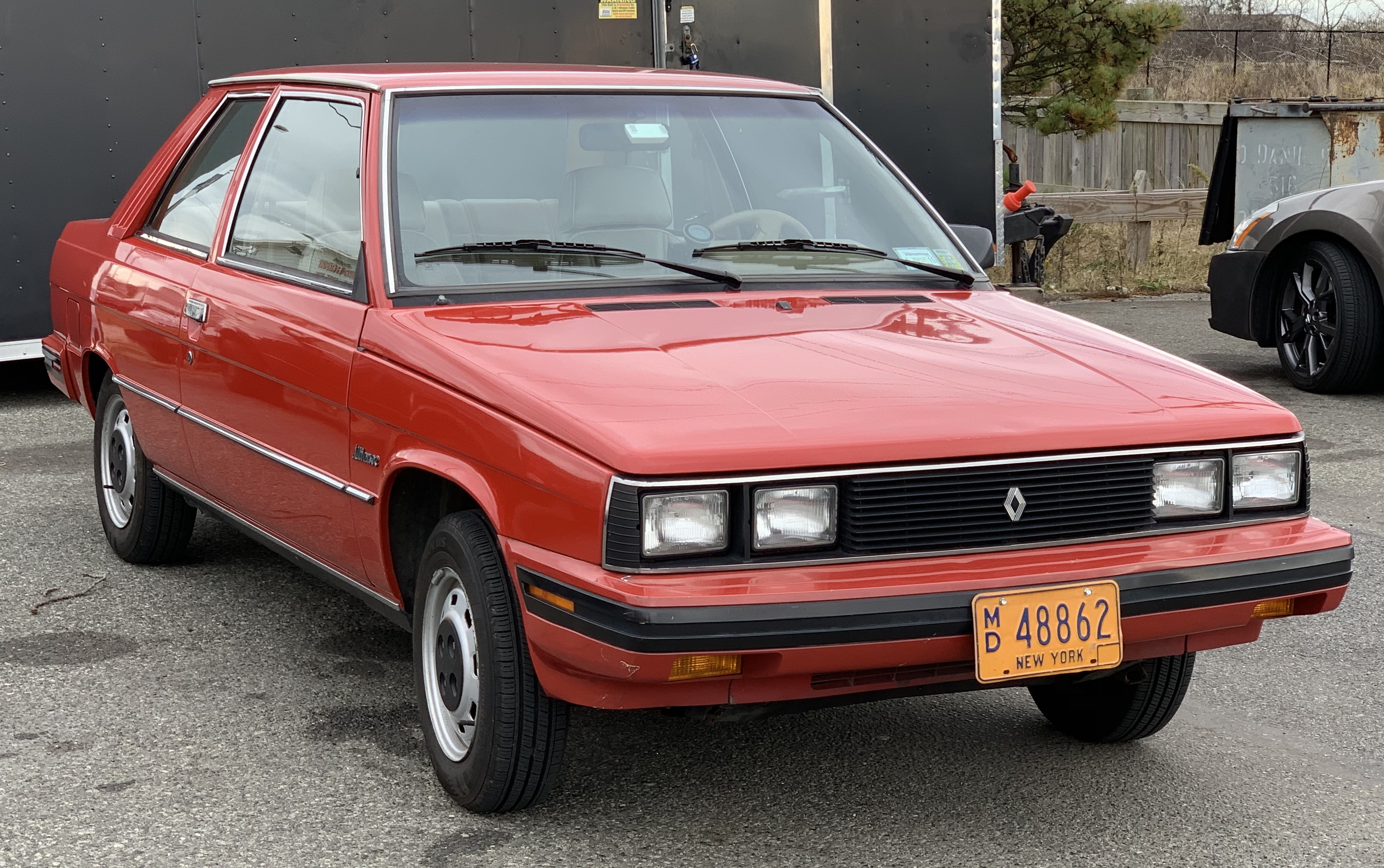

Overview
- Manufacturer: American Motors (1983–1987); Chrysler (1987)
- Production: June 1982–1987
- Model years: 1983–1987
- Assembly: United States: Kenosha, Wisconsin (Kenosha Assembly)
- Designer: Robert Opron; Richard Teague

Body and chassis
- Class: Subcompact
- Body style: Alliance: 2-door, 4-door sedan, 3-door and 5-door hatchback and 2-door convertible; Encore: 3-door and 5-door hatchback; GTA: 2-door sedan and convertible
- Layout: Front-engine, front-wheel drive
- Related: Renault 9 & 11

Powertrain
- Engine: 1.4 L I4 64 hp (48 kW; 65 PS); 1.7 L I4 77.5 hp (58 kW; 79 PS); 2.0 L I4 95 hp (71 kW; 96 PS)
- Transmission: 3-speed automatic; 4-speed manual; 5-speed manual

Dimensions
- Wheelbase: 97.8 in (2,484 mm)
- Length: Alliance: 163.8 in (4,161 mm); Encore: 160.6 in (4,079 mm)
- Width: 65 in (1,651 mm)
- Height: 53.1 in (1,349 mm)
- Curb weight: from: 2,000 lb (907 kg) base 2-door; to: 2,300 lb (1,043 kg) GTA conv.

Chronology
- Predecessor: Renault Le Car; AMC Spirit
- Successor: Eagle Summit; Dodge Shadow; Eagle Vista; Chrysler Shadow; Shelby CSX; Plymouth Sundance

The Renault Alliance is a subcompact manufactured and marketed in North America by American Motors Corporation (AMC) for model years 1983–1987. Originally available in two- and four-door sedan configurations, with a convertible variant introduced for model year 1985; three- and five-door hatchback variants introduced for model year 1984 as the Renault Encore; and a sportier variant, the Renault GTA, introduced for model year 1987. Production reached 623,573 vehicles, all manufactured in Kenosha, Wisconsin, before production ended and AMC was acquired by Chrysler in 1987.

The Alliance and Encore derive from AMC's partnership with Renault, which began in 1979 and at the time held a controlling stake in the smallest U.S. automaker. The Alliance and Encore derived closely from the Renault 9 & 11, re-engineered for the U.S. and Canadian markets. Robert Opron, director of Renault Styling, designed the exterior, and AMC's Richard Teague executed the interior design as well as the two-door sedan and the convertible exteriors, both unique models developed by AMC.

== History ==
Competition from the domestic "Big Three" automakers and the rise of Asian-imported automobiles, new safety regulations, the 1973 oil crisis, and the 1979 energy crisis left American Motors in a weak position in the U.S. marketplace. The company had three product lines: a profitable line of government vehicles, Jeeps, and passenger cars. However, sales dropped suddenly in 1979 with a declining economy, meaning all four domestic automakers saw their sales plummet, but this decline was dangerous to AMC's survival with only a 2% share of the U.S. passenger car market.

Banks refused to provide AMC further credit to develop new products for the changing marketplace, so AMC turned to Renault for a $90 million loan. As the U.S. economy entered the early 1980s recession, AMC signed an agreement with Renault giving a share in AMC's ownership in exchange for the rights to sell Renault cars in the U.S.

Chrysler received US$1.5 billion in loan guarantees when Congress passed the "Chrysler Corporation Loan Guarantee Act of 1979", However, lawmakers did not consider AMC to be "too big to fail". Thus, the smallest U.S. automaker sought assistance from the French government-owned company. By the end of 1980, Renault held a controlling interest in AMC. Some called it "Franco-American Motors," a pun on the French-American combination and the Franco-American food company.

With the United States dollar then relatively weak against the French franc, manufacturing in the U.S. seemed the best way to grow, especially since fuel prices were rising and the major U.S. carmakers had yet to bring out large numbers of small, fuel-efficient cars. Renault's objective was to build its newer models at AMC's existing manufacturing plants, thus avoiding the problems Volkswagen encountered with its "Rabbit" version of the Mk1 Golf assembled in its new factory in Westmoreland, Pennsylvania.

The two automakers worked closely as each design studio developed spin-offs of cars created by the other. Richard Teague, AMC's Vice President of Design, and his French counterpart, Robert Opron, director of Renault Styling, each traveled between France and the U.S. at least three times a year. Originally only a four-door sedan body style, Teague and AMC's design staff decided to mock-up a two-door coupe just before Opron was to review the work of the American team.

Renault executives came in to run things alongside AMC officials, and the veritable factory in Kenosha, Wisconsin was retooled to produce an Americanized version of the European Renault 9 subcompact under the "Alliance" nameplate. Consumer clinics were conducted between 1979 and 1982 using a fiberglass mock-up (and later with actual cars) to evaluate various issues that concerned AMC officials. Market research indicated that consumers preferred the Renault name over AMC, though not strongly. The model was named the Renault Alliance, with the AMC logo only on a small sticker affixed on the inside of the rear window, as well as printed at the bottom or back of the advertising materials.

Production began in 1982, making Renault the second European automaker to build cars in the U.S. The cars were aimed at the lowest price range in the U.S. market; the two-door Alliance had a sticker price starting at $5,595. The European Car of the Year for 1982 was described as "the bargain of the year in the U.S." for 1983.

== Model years ==
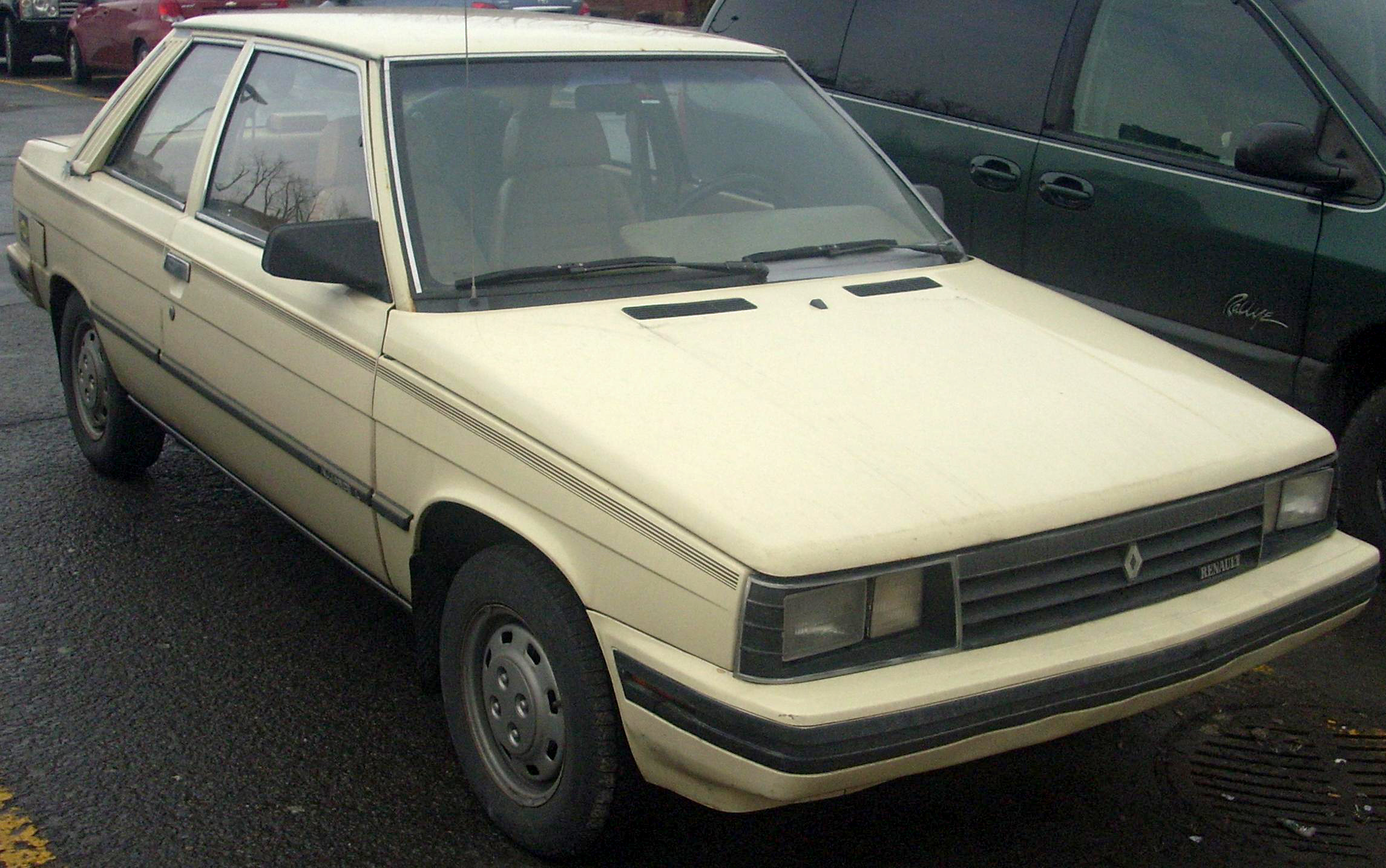
1986 Alliance 2-door sedan

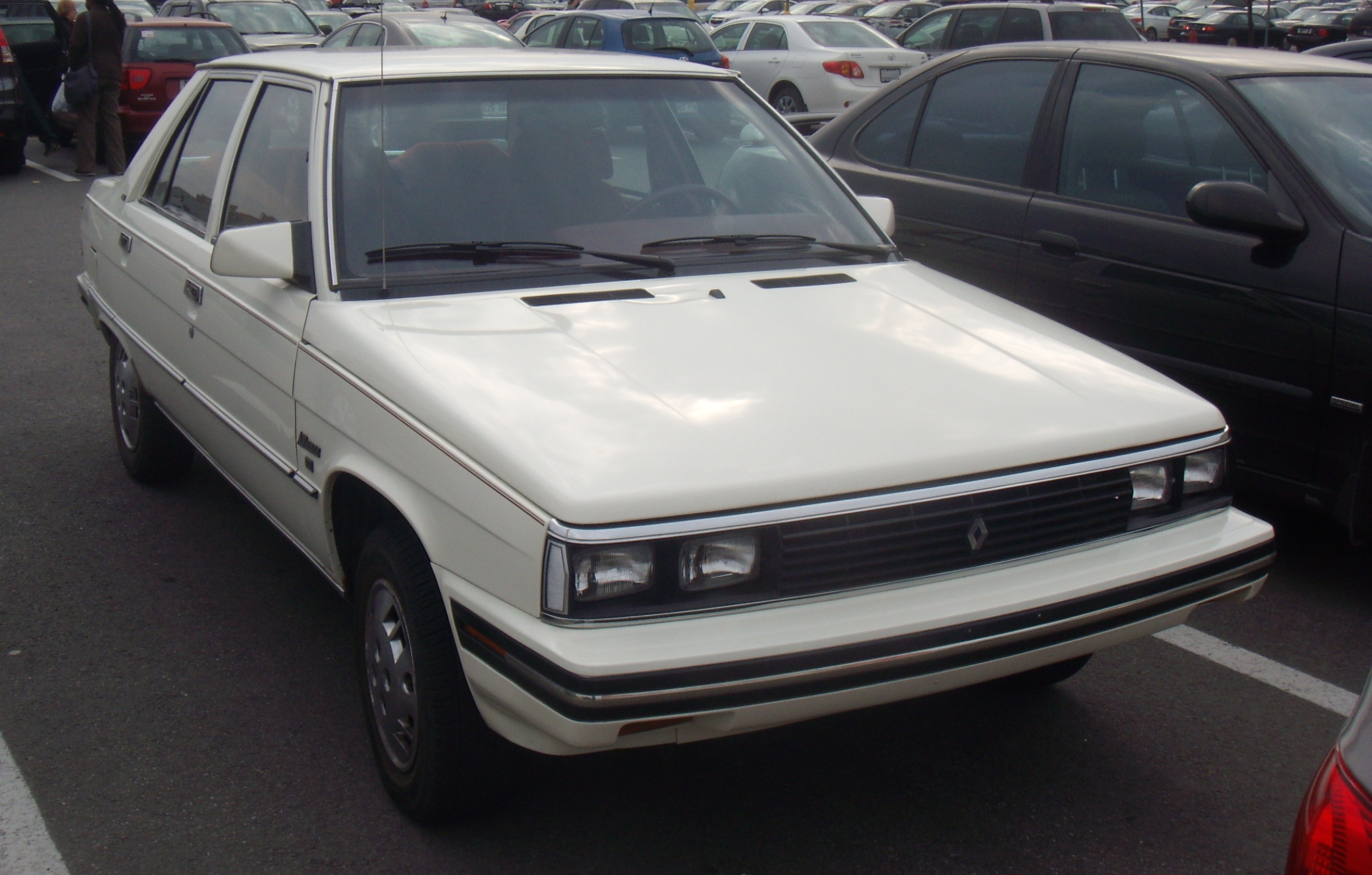
1986 Alliance 4-door sedan

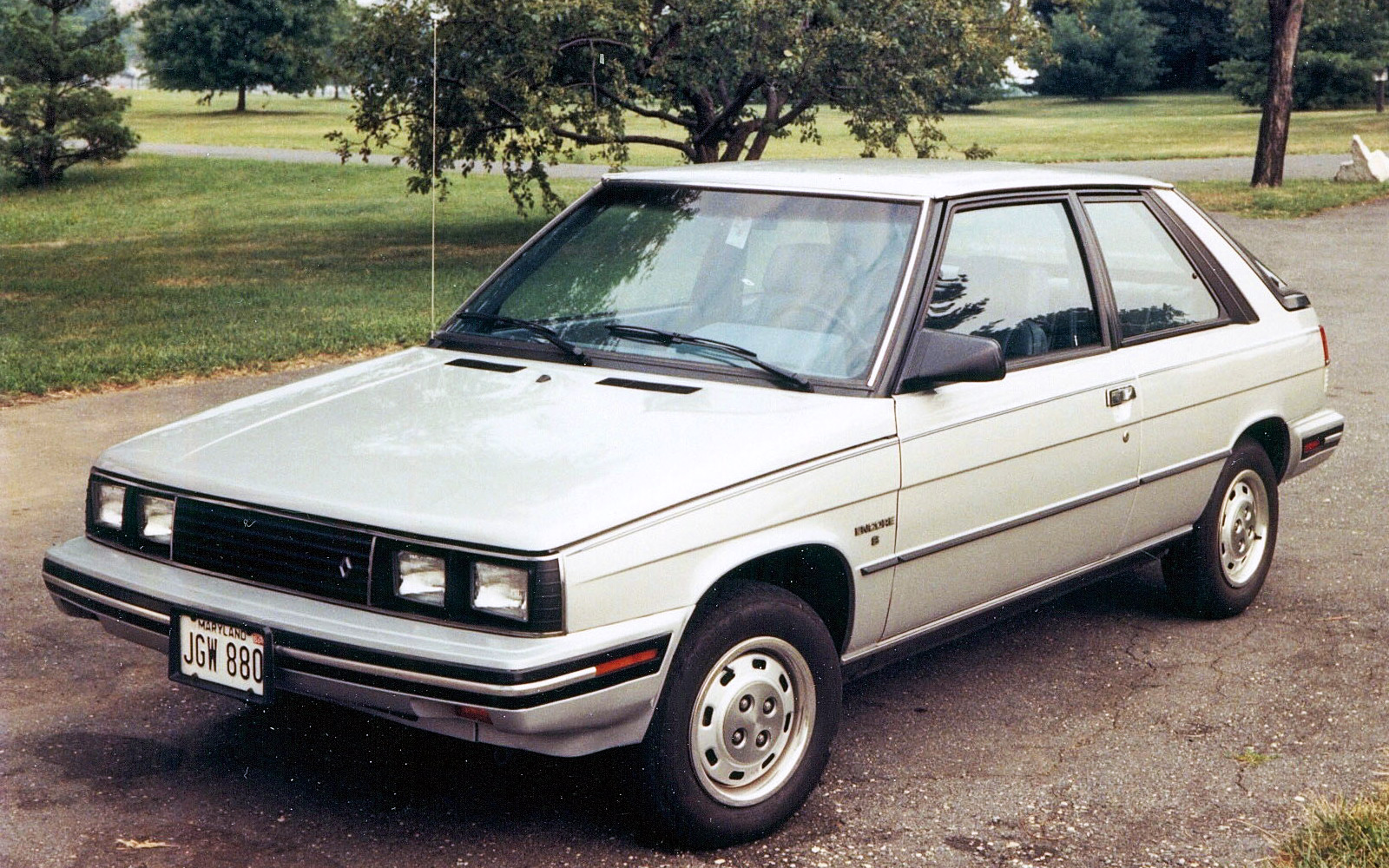
1985 Encore 2-door hatchback

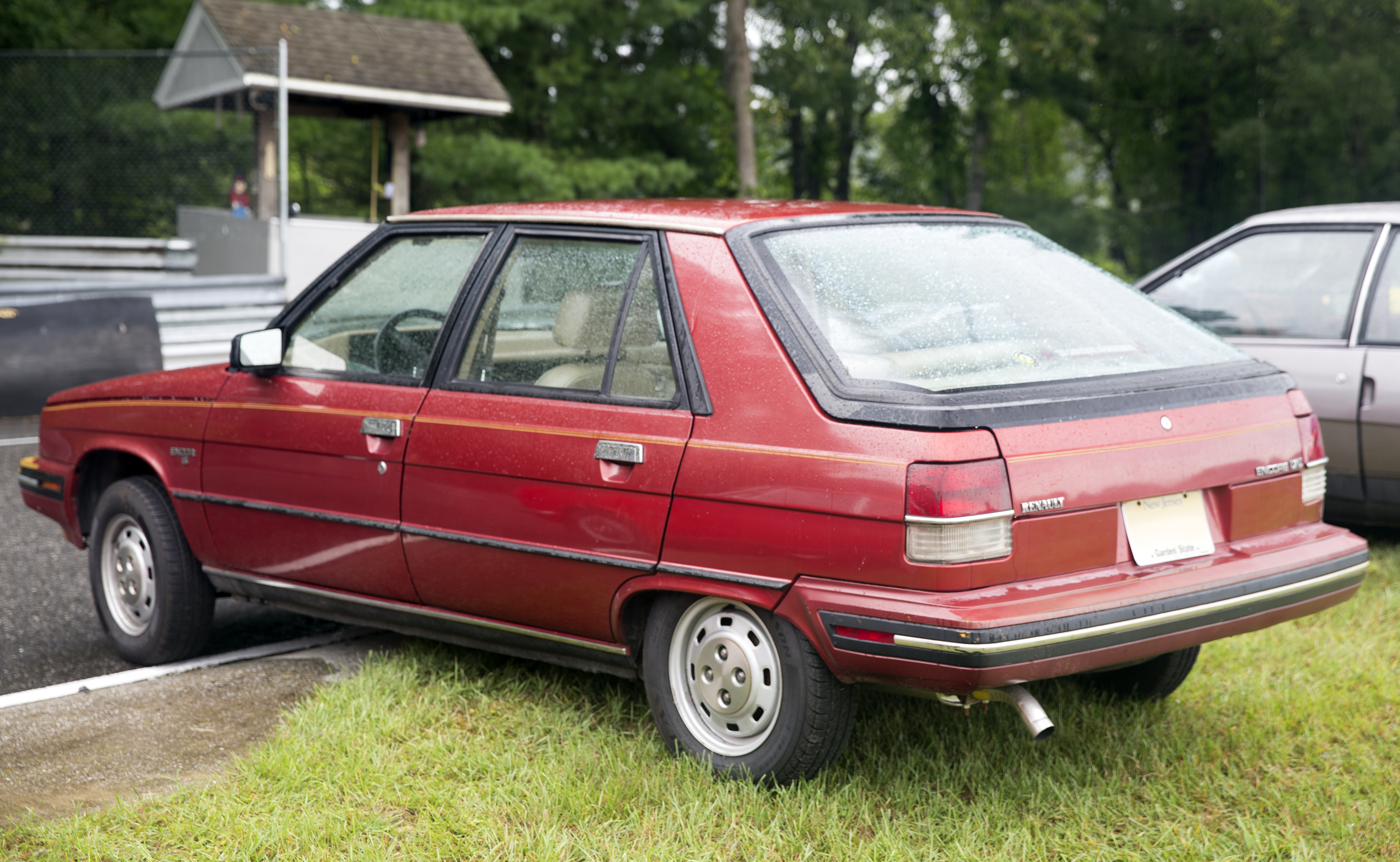
1985 Encore 5-door hatchback

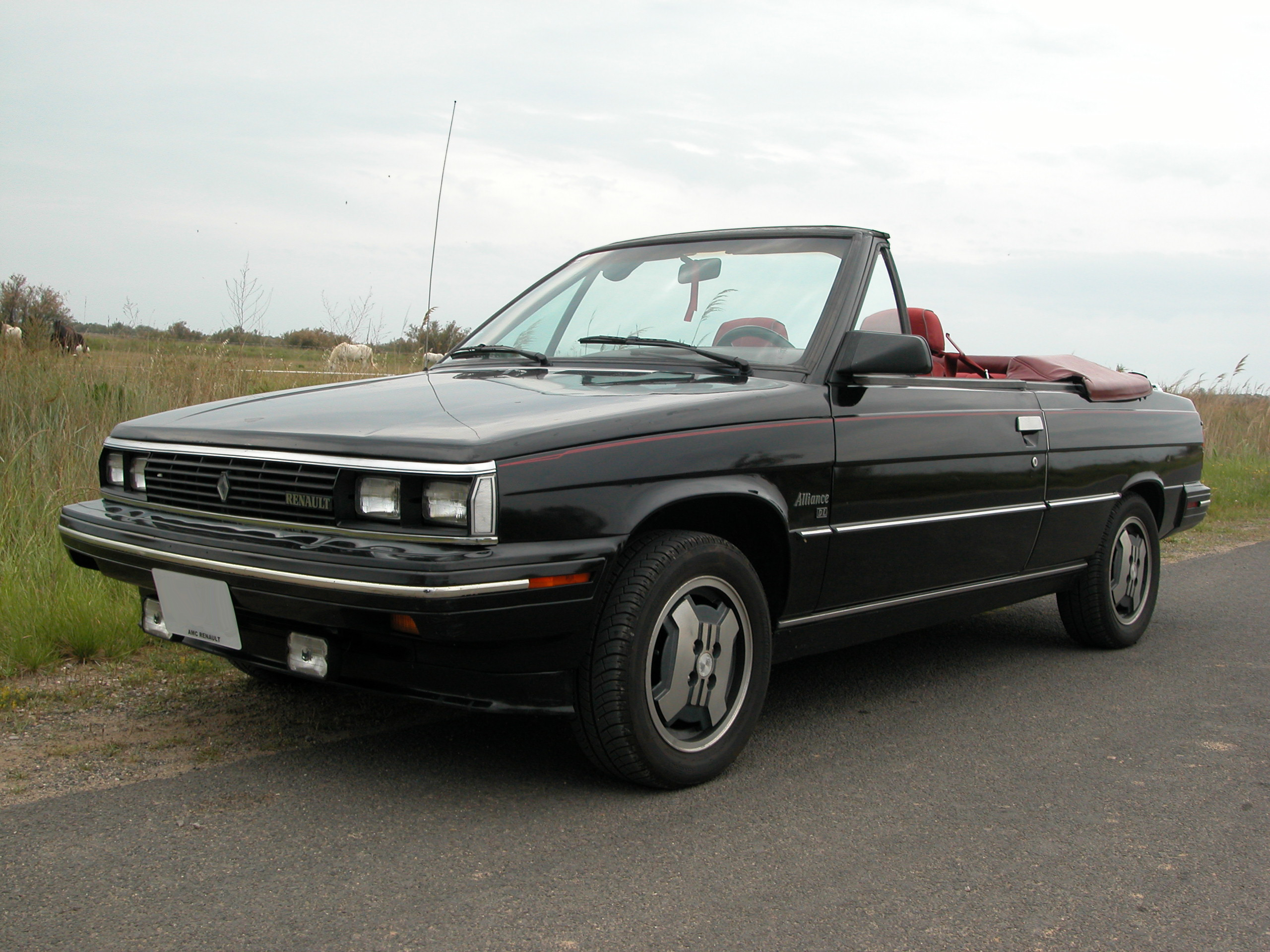
1986 Alliance convertible DL

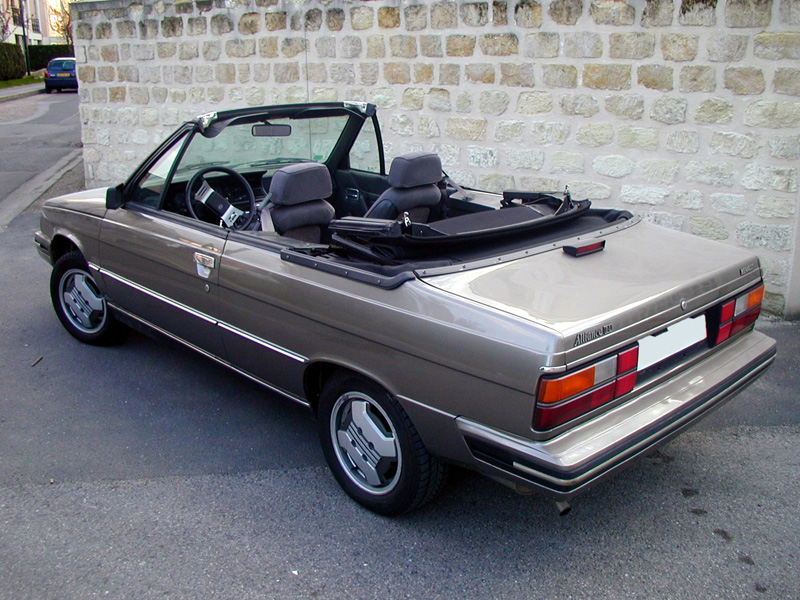
Alliance L convertible

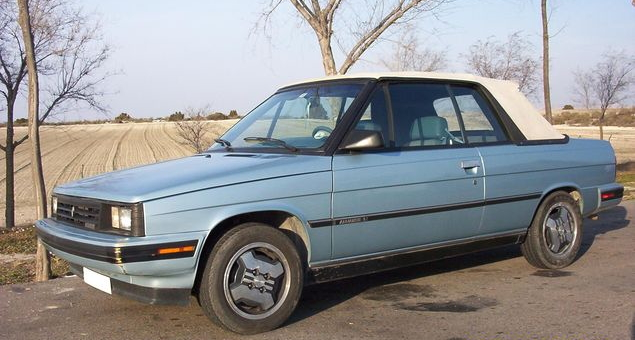
1987 Alliance L convertible

For context of the era, the Alliance was launched into the U.S. subcompact market segment that included the Chevrolet Chevette, a basic and dated rear-wheel drive car; the Toyota Corolla E70 with a good reputation, but also still featuring an outdated design and rear-drive layout, the Volkswagen "Rabbit", the first-generation replacement for the original Beetle; the four-year old Chrysler twins Dodge Omni and Plymouth Horizon that were less fuel efficient; the simple Honda Civic (second generation) with a high rating and a matching high price; and none of them could come anywhere close to the high level of Alliance's passenger comfort.

=== 1983 ===
The Alliance two- and four-door sedan was launched in June 1982 as a 1983 model after a US$150 million overhaul of AMC's Kenosha, Wisconsin, assembly plant. Although it was branded as a Renault, the car bore AMC's logo on a rear window decal. It was officially classified as a domestic automobile because it had more than 70% U.S.-produced parts.

The Alliance was a modern front-drive sedan with a 163.8-inch (4,161 mm) overall length on a 97.8-inch (2,484 mm) wheelbase featuring a thrifty, transverse four-cylinder engine. The Alliance had a long list of standard equipment and achieved 37 mpg_{‑US} (6 L/100 km; 44 mpg_{‑imp}) in city driving. Fuel economy on the highway with the five-speed manual transmission approached 60 mpg_{‑US} (4 L/100 km; 72 mpg_{‑imp}). It was a sensible car for a post-oil crisis period in which good fuel economy was highly prized.

The Alliance was equipped with a Renault-supplied OHV 1.4 L I4 engine from the Renault Le Car. Cars sold in 49-states came with a Renix throttle-body fuel injection, while California emissions standards required the use of multi port injection. This four-cylinder was upgraded with the latest electronics that included an electronically controlled fuel system, a digital ignition system, and a microprocessor to manage the optional three-speed automatic transmission. Although Renault transmissions have been equipped with Renix based electronics and sensor assemblies, the all-new electronic controlled transmission system in the Alliance was an innovation to the U.S. mass-market.

Power went through either a four- or five-speed manual, or a three-speed automatic transaxle. The base engine produced 64 hp (48 kW; 65 PS) to accelerate the 2,030-pound (921 kg) Alliance from 0 to 60 mph in 14.3 seconds, and gave it an 89-mile (143 km) top speed. Steering was rack and pinion. The suspension system was fully independent via MacPherson struts in front, while the rear had a compact and ingenious system of transverse torsion bars and trailing arms. At just under 2,000 lb (907 kg) for the base model, the Alliance was also the lightest car assembled in the U.S. in its time.

The Alliance was slightly smaller on the outside than the competing first-generation Ford Escort (North America). Nevertheless, it was somewhat bigger on the inside, where it looked larger and more inviting. Interior space was good for four or occasionally five people, in part due to a cleverly engineered front seats—where each seat was mounted on a 9-inch (229 mm) wide central rail (rather than two side tracks) allowing for copious rear foot room on either side of the rail. In addition to the usual recline and fore-and-aft movements, the upscale DL models included a curved track that allowed the seat to be adjusted along the arc to find the most comfortable position for driver and passenger.

The Alliance sold well, with over 142,000 units in its 1983 debut year. Sales were limited by the availability of only two body styles. American Motors had several four-door Alliances converted into stretch limousines for publicity and official use.

=== 1984 ===
American Motors introduced a companion model called Encore featuring a hatchback in both two- and four-door versions. The new derivatives featured a redesigned rear end and were 3.2 inches (81 mm) shorter than the Alliance sedans. "More versatile and a little more luxurious than the Alliance," the marketing objective of the Encore was to attract younger and more "upscale" customers, but they were really the same cars. California engines featured a Bosch LU multi-point fuel-injection system. The 1984 models introduced innovative electronics that included an infrared remote power locking system, a "Systems Sentry" monitoring fluid levels, as well as electronically tuned sound systems.

Bolstered by the additional two- and four-door hatchback models, sales increased to over 208,000 for 1984. While the financial fortunes of its French partner faltered, AMC recorded $7.4 million profit in fourth quarter of 1983, which a contrast to the previous 14 consecutive quarters of losses. According to Jose Dedeurwaerder, a Renault executive who became AMC's president, 1984 was profitable for AMC on an annual basis for the first time since 1979 during which the automaker lost $637.6 million.

However, the new Encores were introduced just in time to encounter a sag in the small-car market because as fuel prices fell, consumers began to drift away to larger automobiles, leaving the Renault-based models to scramble against low-priced Chevrolet Chevettes, Ford Escorts, the Dodge Omni and Plymouth Horizon twins, as well as a slew of Japanese imports.

=== 1985 ===
The 1.7 L fuel injection (EFI) engine with a five-speed transmission was introduced in 1985 as an option on all versions except the base model. It developed 96 lb⋅ft (130 N⋅m) of torque at 3000 rpm and 77.5 hp (58 kW; 79 PS) at 5000 rpm. Designed to use either gasoline or diesel, the new engine featured five main bearing engine and was torture-tested to higher levels than normal to be "the strongest four in the industry." The fully pressurized cooling system eliminated corrosive oxygen while engineers reduced the number of connections to avoid coolant leaks for both the 1.7 and 1.4 engines.

In addition to the sedan, the Alliance was now offered as a convertible for 1985 (AMC's first of this body type since the 1968 Rebel). The design was in collaboration with American Sunroof Company (now American Specialty Cars) that reinforced the Alliance's unibody for torsional rigidity during manufacture in Kenosha, Wisconsin.

Potential buyers were asking at AMC/Jeep/Renault dealerships for an Alliance-based station wagon; instead, the dealers showed them the larger Renault 18 Sportwagon.

By 1985, the U.S. automobile market was beginning to shift away from the subcompact Alliance and Encore as the gasoline crisis ended and consumers were buying larger cars. Additionally, increasing competition in the subcompact market segment from imported vehicles led to a decline in total Alliance and Encore sales to 150,000 in 1985.

=== 1986 ===
For the 1986 model year, the Alliance and its variants received a revised instrument panel with a prominent horizontal brow extending across the center console and stack, as well as slightly revised headlights and front fascia, a revised Renix fuel injection system for the 1.4 L engine, and minor trim revisions.

Improving economic conditions in the United States, along with lower gasoline prices, resulted in sales of 65,000 Alliances in 1986. American Motors had already stopped production of the Concord and Spirit in 1983 (the four-wheel drive AMC Eagle continued to be built), while the larger Medallion (to replace the Renault 18) was not ready until 1987. The automaker responded by offering zero-interest financing on the Alliance and Encore models in the fall of 1986. By mid-December 1986, around 2,000 hourly employees at its Kenosha factory were put on temporary layoff through the first week of January to balance inventory with sales of the Alliance.

=== 1987 ===
A separate model was added for the 1987 model year: the GTA, which offered higher performance and whose name recalled the Alpine GTA. All models received a front-end facelift and featured new headlamps. The remainder of the Alliance line was carried over, but the two Encore hatchback body variants were renamed the Alliance Hatchback.

The government of French President François Mitterrand was concerned with an upcoming election at a time when Renault not only lost its number one automaker spot in Europe, but was also losing money. Moreover, while Georges Besse championed the opportunities in the North American market, Renault executives and labor leaders perceived AMC as a bottomless pit. On 9 March 1987, Chrysler agreed to buy Renault's share in AMC, plus all the remaining shares, for about US$1.5 billion (US$4,250,878,735 in 2026 dollars) and AMC's operations became the new Jeep-Eagle division of Chrysler.

The focus of Chrysler's acquisition was on the highly profitable Jeep vehicles and the brand-new Brampton Assembly plant that was just built in Ontario, Canada. In the first five months of 1987, only 13,390 Alliances were sold while inventory levels increased. Nevertheless, press kits were prepared for the 1988 models and early media reports of upcoming 1988 cars stated "with the buy-out of American Motors, Chrysler will continue to market the subcompact Renault Alliance..."

Alliance production at the Kenosha plant closed out as of Friday, 5 June 1987. The Alliance competed with Chrysler's domestic and imported models such as the Dodge Omni, Shadow and Colt, as well as similar versions sold by Plymouth.

With AMC's acquisition, Chrysler found itself "saddled with a largely unsuccessful assortment of cars," including imports from Renault. The Alliance line of passenger automobiles did not fit into Chrysler's existing product mix. In 1987, about 35,000 Alliances were sold.

== GTA ==
1987 GTA two-door sedan

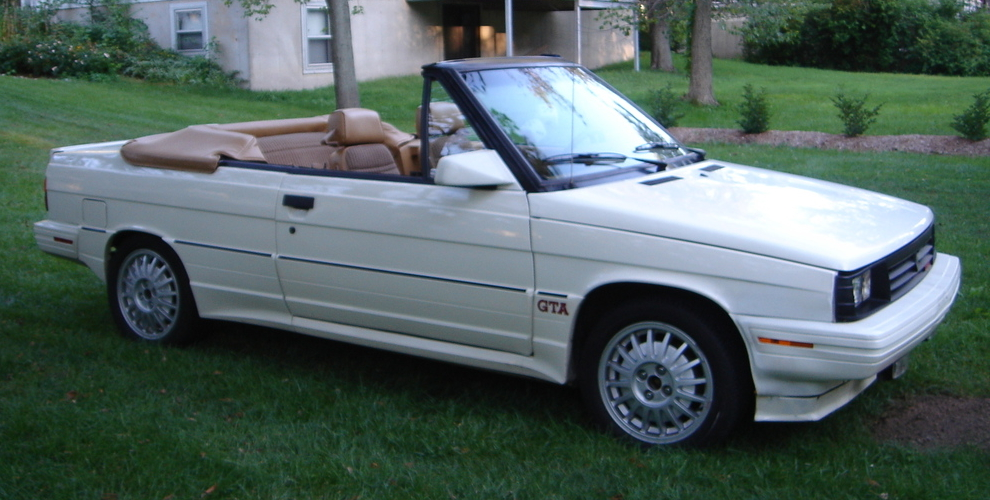
1987 GTA convertible

The Renault GTA was a performance version of the Alliance for the 1987 model year. It was manufactured during 1986 and early 1987 as a limited production, specialty model. It was described as "dandy little sports car" and a "pocket rocket" defined as a low-priced "car based on high production economy but with emphasis placed on appearance, performance and handling." It replicated what Volkswagen had done when the Rabbit was upgraded into the GTI.

The GTA was available in 2-door sedan or convertible versions, with a single powerplant: a 2.0 L fuel-injected 4-cylinder engine. At 4900 rpm with premium U.S. gasoline, this engine developed 95 hp (71 kW; 96 PS). Driving performance of the vehicle included a 10.2-second mark for 0 to 60 mph and a .89 g-force cornering rating in road tests conducted by Car and Driver magazine.

The GTA used the same uni-body as the two-door Alliances, but was distinctive to the other models. It was available only in silver, white, red, or black monochrome body paint with special color-keyed "ground effects" bodyside cladding styled by Zender of West Germany, one of Europe's leading after-market designers. It also featured 15-inch aluminum alloy sport wheels with low-profile Michelin Sport XGT 195-VR50 series tires, upgraded suspension with thicker sway bars, vented front disc brakes, larger exhaust pipe, optional driving lights, custom body moldings, a small spoiler on the rear trunk, red inlaid shift knob, close ratio gears on the manual transmission, stiffer engine mounts, larger brake booster, and special bolstered "racing" seats unique to the model. An automatic transmission was not available.

Road test of the GTA described it to be quite comfortable with responsive handling that "was particularly impressive on tortuous back roads. It just hung in there like a sports car under the most trying conditions ... Hard acceleration will usually result in spinning wheels and a good deal of torque steer."

The GTA served as a "last-ditch" sales booster for the economical Alliance line. However, the models were discontinued when Chrysler bought AMC, and Renault pulled out of the U.S. market.

== Reception ==
The basis of the Alliance, the Renault 9 was voted the 1982 European Car of the Year. It became France's most popular car and Renault's best-selling model ever.

The Alliance was listed as number one on Car and Driver's list of Ten Best cars for 1983. The magazine's editors wrote that it "represents a blending of compact dimensions, surprising creature comfort, excellent fuel economy, good looks and very pleasing over-the-road behavior." They noted, "if we were some other magazine, this would be our car of the year."

The American-built, French-designed Renault Alliance had a U.S. content of 72%. The engine, gearbox, and some axle parts came from France, thus qualifying it as a domestic vehicle and making it the first car (in 1983) with a foreign nameplate to win the Motor Trend Car of the Year award. Motor Trend subsequently dropped the distinction between domestic and imported vehicles for the award in 2000.

A long-term test of a four-door Alliance by Popular Mechanics described the car as "economical, well-built and has superb ride quality" summarizing that "it's nearly perfect." The engine was smooth, refined, and built tight, but difficult to "keep on cam" with the automatic transmission. The suspension system was praised for its ability to cope with "suspension-destruction" roads at higher than normal speeds while providing good road feel with excellent handling and cornering – achieving .71 g-force on the skid pad with the small standard 175/70xR13 tires.

A 1983 Popular Mechanics survey of 1,000 owners said "60% of our respondents rated the Alliance's workmanship excellent. That's a high figure for any car and considerably above the norm for U.S. built cars." The magazine's editor-in-chief, John Linkletter, addressed the findings that "the old canard about shoddy American craftsmanship suffers" and that "an American manufacturer and a foreign manufacturer can, in a combined effort, produce a very good car."

In 1983, Popular Science described that, "Renault will find its reputation dramatically brightened when word of the AMC Alliance gets around." The report expanded, "The new Alliance is a miracle for AMC. Not only does it show a general excellence in construction and appointments, it's also a state-of-the-art front-wheel-drive that AMC could not have produced on its own. Combine those three elements and you have tough competition for the Escort, Chevette and Horizon and the imports, and a product that comes close to being the best in its class."

A 1983 report in the New York Times described, "the Alliance's appeal has brought AMC's United States car sales 117.6 percent ahead of 1982 levels."

After a long-term road test conducted by Popular Mechanics of a four-door with a 1.7 L and automatic transmission setup in 1985, the experience was summarized as a "faithful servant", but a "generic no-frills car" – except for the unusual steering wheel stalks – that "nothing gave us pause" with their "compliant appliance".

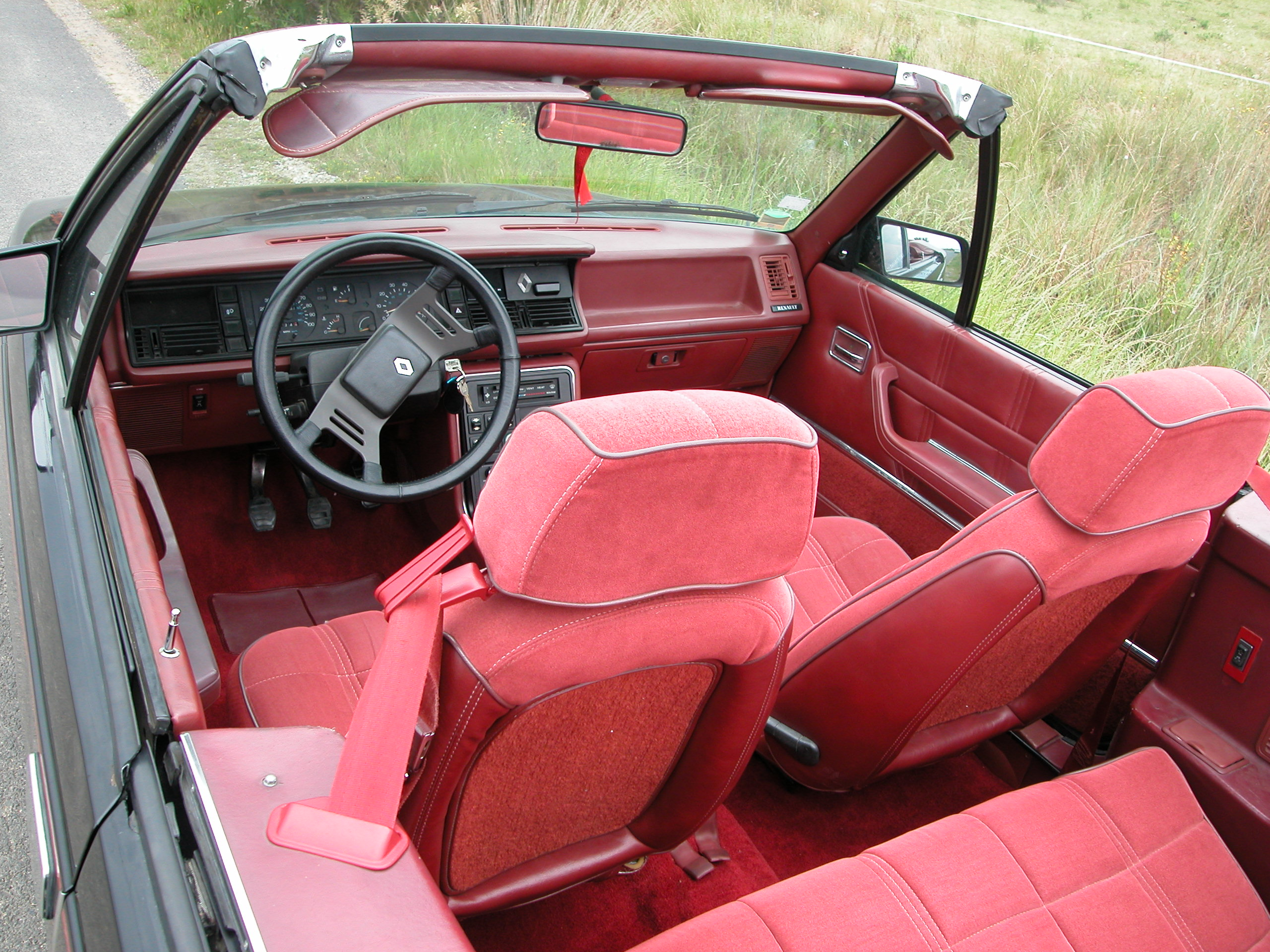
Alliance interior

By 1986, a Popular Science comparison with newly introduced Asian-built competing cars, the Renault Alliance was described as the oldest design, and "felt the most refined." The road test noted the Renault did well in the tests with "trunk and doors closed with an almost Mercedes-like clunk" and "the car's excellent handling" allowing to remain poised through potholes and "stable when passed by large tractor-trailer trucks." The Alliance performed better than the new Hyundai Excel and that Renault "dealers would be willing to negotiate on the final price."

In 1987, Popular Mechanics reported on the Alliance convertible in sports trim, saying "the GTA package is really excellent, transforming the bland Alliance econobox into a veritable Pocket Rocket."

In 1987, the New York Times reported, "despite the favorable early response to products like the Alliance and the Encore, the models failed to generate enough sales to prevent AMC's share of the car market from declining to about 1 percent."

== Racing series ==
The Sports Car Club of America (SCCA) spec-racing series Renault LeCar Cup was successful, and while relatively underpowered with its "fuel sipping" 1.4 L engine, the Alliance's "excellent" ride and handling compared to the other small cars sold in America at the time, was an advantage that contributed to establishing the Alliance Cup in 1983. Modifications to the showroom stock cars were limited to fitting a roll cage, free flow exhaust, upgraded shock absorbers, as well as wider rims and tires.

The Alliance provided many donor parts (engine and suspension) for the Sports Renault race car, a single-make series created by the Sports Car Club of America (SCCA) in 1984. Designed by Roy Lunn, it was a low-cost purpose-built racer. The car was developed and manufactured by Renault/Jeep Sport USA in Livonia, Michigan, under the direction of Vic Elford. More than 500 were built. Most cars still exist, although the majority have been converted to use a Ford engine (thus now known as Spec Racer Fords), and run in the SCCA club-racing program.

== Legacy ==
The 1983 Motor Trend Car of the Year award for the Renault Alliance was an industry-wide recognition that contributed to increased sales, as well as to AMC's profits of about $15 million in 1984 (US$46,484,625 in 2026 dollars).

The Alliance allowed AMC to field a new compact car without the expense of its design and tooling. However, the business relationship with Renault exacted a heavy price on the U.S. company. The automaker was required to shed its profitable AM General line of commercial and military vehicles because of U.S. Government regulations prohibiting foreign companies from owning domestic military suppliers.

Automotive journalist Gary Witzenburg noted that the Alliance sedan's "excellent reputation and phenomenal first-year success" caused AMC to stop production of its larger and older Spirit and Concord with the introduction of the new hatchback versions under a different name. The initial positive reception and the "impressive" sales total of 200,000 Alliances by the end of 1984 was later hindered by the market offer of only two models while the competition was offering a wider range of cars for the market segments.

Renault failed to accommodate European-origin cars to U.S. market demands fully. These included the Alliance's less powerful engine whose output was further limited by the more demanding U.S. emission requirements, as well as the popularity of air conditioning in the U.S. that European buyers seldom ordered. The exchange rate of the U.S. dollar also became "very problematic in the mid-1980s" due to the inflation and declining economy in the U.S., compared to French currency. Renault also did not consider the costs of manufacturing at AMC, and failed to "properly support its distribution network" because AMC's dealerships were seldom brand exclusive. The mistakes in controlling "the quality delivered by the distribution network" resulted in "disastrous" consequences for the image of the automobiles, as well as increasing warranty costs.

The Alliance has the arguable distinction of being the car that saved AMC, while at the same time the cars possibly hastened the automaker's disappearance as an independent company.
