= Kenosha Engine =

Automobile and engine plant in Wisconsin, US

- Operated: 1902; 124 years ago to October 2010; 15 years ago
- Location: 5555 30th Ave; Kenosha, Wisconsin
- Coordinates: 42.5842°N 87.8424°W
- Industry: Automotive
- Products: Engines
- Area: 107 acres (43.3 ha)
- Volume: 1,870,000 sq ft (174,000 m^{2})
- Owners: Thomas B. Jeffery Co. (1902–1954); American Motors (1954–1987); Chrysler (1987–2010)
- Defunct: October 2010; 15 years ago

Kenosha Engine was an automobile and engine factory in Kenosha, Wisconsin. It was first opened for automobile production in 1902 by the Thomas B. Jeffery Company and later operated by American Motors. The Kenosha Engine Plant saw all operations halted by Chrysler. It was permanently closed in October 2010 and demolished between December 2012 and April 2013.

== History ==
The factory was opened in 1902 by the Thomas B. Jeffery Company, which evolved into Nash Motors in 1916, American Motors Corporation (AMC) in 1954, and was acquired by Chrysler in 1987.

Passenger vehicle production at the Lakefront and Kenosha Main plants was discontinued on 23 December 1988 (or mid-model year 1989). These were the L-Body Dodge Omni and Plymouth Horizon FWD models, as well as the M-body RWD sedans, Chrysler Fifth Avenue, Dodge Diplomat, and Plymouth Fury. The facility was downsized and continued to manufacture engines .

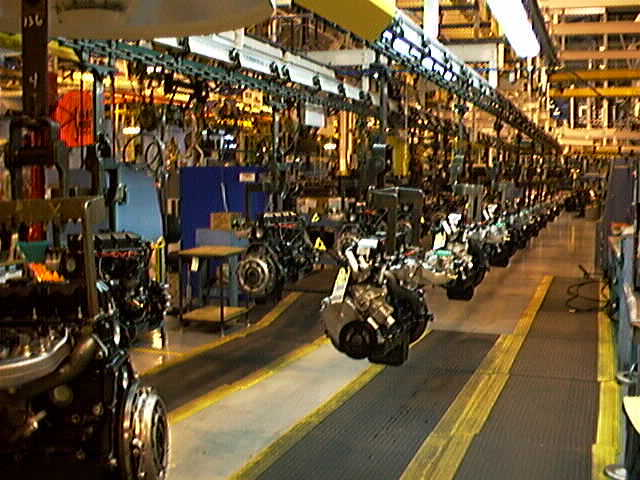
Kenosha Engine assembly on 19 October 1997

The opening of the 3.5-liter engine line in 2002 came after the company invested $624 million in a 450,000-square-foot (42,000 m^{2}) plant expansion.

In 2006, the Kenosha Engine factory employed 1,300 people.

Chrysler Group announced in 2007 its plan to invest $450 million to retool the Kenosha engine plant to build a new V6 engine, code-named "Phoenix".

Kenosha Engine was one of Chrysler Group's Powertrain plants that scored at the top of their segment, according to the 2007 Harbour Report North America report, a broadly accepted measure of productivity in the automotive industry.

Significantly, Chrysler excluded employees of the Kenosha plant from its 2 February 2009 buyout offer for hourly workers. In May 2009, approximately 800 workers were employed at the plant.

On 1 May 2009, Chrysler announced that the Kenosha Engine plant was to close by the end of 2010 due to Chrysler's bankruptcy and restructuring plan.

In response to news of the closure of the Kenosha Engine plant, hundreds of auto workers held a rally on 4 May 2009. Members of United Auto Workers Local 72 did not understand why they would be losing their jobs while the company would keep operations going in Saltillo, Mexico. Union leaders, the Kenosha County executive, governor Jim Doyle, and others appealed to Obama administration officials and to executives at both Fiat and Chrysler to reverse the decision to shut down the facility.

After Chrysler assets were transferred to a new corporation operated by Fiat as part of emerging from Chrysler Chapter 11 reorganization on 10 June 2009, the Kenosha Engine plant was restarted.

However, by August 2010, Chrysler announced the closure of the facility and its remaining 575 jobs.

The end of 108 years of automaking in Kenosha arrived when the last engine was produced on 22 October 2010. At that time, the future of the engine plant site in the city's center remained unknown, and Kenosha city officials were worried. The Old Carco Liquidation Trust, the owner of assets formerly held by Chrysler LLC, unsuccessfully tried to market the site to other industrial users.

By October 2011, an agreement was reached to transfer ownership of the property to either the city or the state, with $10 million in federal Troubled Asset Relief Program (TARP) money available to help clean up environmental problems at the site. An auction was held in December 2011, for the machines and equipment in the Kenosha Engine plant under order of the United States Bankruptcy Court. It took three days to sell tools, ranging from drill bits to machine tools bigger than trucks, inside the plant.

Demolition of the plant complex began in late 2012. Cleanup was completed by the week of 27 April 2013. In February 2014, Old Carco Liquidation Trust abandoned the former Kenosha Engine Plant, and the city of Kenosha accepted title to the property. The city of Kenosha, Wisconsin Department of Health Services, United States Environmental Protection Agency, and Kenosha County Division of Health collaborated on environmental assessment, remediation, and preparation of the property for redevelopment.

== Products ==
- AMC straight-6 engines
- AMC V8 engines
- 1997–2010 PowerTech 2.7 L V6
- 2003–2010 3.5 L V6
