= Kenosha/Racine Lead-Free Communities Partnership =

- Formation: 2007-03-01
- Type: GO
- Purpose: lead hazard reduction
- Location(s): 8600 Sheridan Rd, Ste 600 Kenosha, WI 53143 730 Washington Rd, Rm 1 Racine, WI 53403
- Region served: Kenosha County and city of Racine
- Affiliations: Kenosha County Division of Health, City of Racine Department of Environmental Health
- Website: Website, Website, Website, Website

The Kenosha/Racine Lead-Free Communities Partnership is a joint venture of Kenosha County, Wisconsin and the city of Racine, Wisconsin, along with various community organizations. It began in March 2007 as a three-year program with a goal of making 320 homes in Racine and Kenosha lead-safe. Its overall aim is to educate the public about the dangers of lead poisoning and to help low-income families with small children improve their living conditions by replacing and/or repairing the largest sources of lead in their home. As of July 9, 2009, 433 living units had been assessed and the program had cleared 321 homes of lead hazards.

== Lead Demonstration Grant ==
The program was awarded a three-year Lead Demonstration Grant from the United States Department of Housing and Urban Development for Lead-Based Paint Hazard Reduction. The primary target of the program is the reinvestment neighborhoods of the cities of Kenosha and Racine due to the age of the housing stock and a higher percentage of at-risk low-income families. Some homes have received new siding, windows, doors, and walls through the program.

== Targeted groups ==
The primary goal of the Kenosha/Racine Lead-Free Communities Partnership is to protect children under the age of six via lead hazard control. Lead-based paint was banned in 1978 and as a result the program focuses on homes built before the ban was enacted. Children under the age of six are targeted due to the seriousness of brain damage that can occur if a child under six is poisoned by lead.

== Stated goals ==
The goals of the program, for the three years of its grant between 2009 and 2012, are as follows:

- Provide an appropriate level of interim controls and abatement services to identified housing units, and clearance testing for 250 residential units.
- Continue to increase the pool of qualified lead abatement contractors by identifying and providing technical support to companies and/or organizations that otherwise do not have the capacity to perform abatement .
- Provide an outreach service which includes lead-based paint risk assessments and education for the 200-250 residential units depending on vacancy rate.
- Provide a full continuum of services for the children residing in the 250 units, including blood samples, reporting, treatment and medical follow-up.

== Process of lead abatement ==
=== Application ===
The Kenosha/Racine Lead-Free Communities Partnership follows the same procedure for each residence that they assess. Anyone can apply for the program, provided that their household income falls below 80% of the area's median income level. Both the owner and occupants must agree to participate in the program.

=== Detection ===
Upon completion of the initial paperwork, a risk assessment team tests the home for the presence of lead. Because lead is such a pervasive presence in some of these houses (and present in many surfaces), specific emphasis is on replacing high friction surfaces such as windows or doors. Walls that have significant amounts of lead and are damaged are also eligible for repair. Lead is most commonly found in one of two ways:

- As lead dust
- In paint and other coatings

Lead dust is detected by taking samples in the form of dust wipes from surfaces such as floors and window sills. The samples are then tested by a laboratory that participates in the Environmental Protection Agency's National Lead Laboratory Accreditation Program (NLLAP). Readings from the walls and other surfaces are collected on site with an X-ray fluorescence (XRF) device and are analyzed later. The XRF device allows the program to detect lead in coatings even if it has since been painted over. If lead hazards are found to be present in the home then the home moves into the abatement process.

=== Abatement ===
Once the lead and safety hazards of the home have been assessed, a scope of work is created. The program organizes a walkthrough of the house with multiple abatement contractors, who are eligible for the projects. After bids are awarded, the owner and occupants sign a final contract and abatement begins. The lead abatement is typically finished within three to four days. After the repairs are complete, the partnership tests the premises to make sure the home is lead-safe before the residents return to the house.
