= Kenosha County Division of Health =

Government Organization (US)

Agency overview
- Headquarters: 8600 Sheridan Road, Suite 600 Kenosha, WI 53143-6515
- Employees: 43
- Agency executive: Frank Matteo, Director
- Website: http://www.co.kenosha.wi.us/index.aspx?nid=297

The Kenosha County Division of Health is the local agency tasked with monitoring and improving the health and wellbeing of the citizens of Kenosha County, Wisconsin. Their mission statement is "to assure the delivery of health services necessary to prevent disease, maintain and promote health, and to protect and preserve a healthy environment for all citizens of Kenosha County regardless of ethnic origin, cultural and economic resources."

== Departments ==
=== Nursing ===
The nursing unit provides many clinical services to the residents of Kenosha County.

Clinical services	Number utilized in 2008
Immunization services	13,514
Influenza vaccine	2,355
TB Control	1,340
Women's health	218
Health Check Clinics	87
Prenatal Care Coordination	43
HIV Antibody Testing	574
STD Clinic	886
Reportable Communicable Diseases	381
Child Safety Seat Checks	269
Nurse of the day	12,743
Home Visits	1,656

In addition to these clinical services, the Nursing unit also contracts with Kenosha Unified School District and other Kenosha County schools to provide nurses for 44 schools. It also manages the Kenosha County Women, Infants and Children (WIC) program, which promotes the health of at-risk pregnant, breastfeeding, and postpartum women, infants, and children.

=== Environmental Health ===
The Environmental Health Services unit is responsible for providing information, education, and regulation in the areas of food, water, waste, recreation, lodging, consumer protection, and environmental and human health hazards. Much of the unit is devoted to consumer protection by inspecting, licensing, and regulating restaurants, retail food establishments, mobile home parks, campgrounds, special events, public swimming pools, hotels, motels, tourist rooming houses, tattoo/body piercing establishments, bed and breakfast establishments, and school food service.

This unit is part of the Kenosha/Racine Lead-Free Communities Partnership, which uses funding from the United States Department of Housing and Urban Development to test homes for lead and repair the most hazardous areas. This program was recently renewed for another three-year contract, which will fund it through 2012.

Another program through the Environmental Health Services unit is their Healthy Homes Initiative, which targets children with asthma and allergies and home safety for individuals 65 years or older.

=== Laboratory ===
The Laboratory provides a water testing service for Kenosha County, including swimming pools, beaches, public drinking water supplies and private wells. The laboratory is divided into a few sections:

The Clinical Microbiology/Serology unit is responsible for examining stool samples for organisms that cause infectious diseases, such as Giardia. It also performs tests for diseases such as gonorrhea, syphilis, and Group A Streptococcus, which causes Strep Throat.

The Analytical Chemistry unit conducts tests on public and private water sources for the presence of nitrates, determines the concentration of fluorine in drinking water, and analyzes paint and pottery chips for the presence of lead.

The Forensic Chemistry unit analyzes urine samples and other bodily fluids for evidence of controlled substances and alcohol and testifies in court regarding its findings.

The Environmental Bacteriology unit tests public and private water supplies, swimming pools, beaches, and recreational water for Coliform bacteria. It also documents complaints of food suspected of causing disease outbreaks and identifies insects.

== Healthy People Kenosha County 2010 ==
The Kenosha County Health Division is currently working with Healthy People 2010, Healthiest Wisconsin 2020, and local businesses and organizations to develop a public health strategy for the area. The areas the program is focusing on are:

- Access to health care
- Youth health
- Healthy lifestyles
- Mental health
- Injury prevention
- Environmental Health

An example of one of the projects the initiative supports is a gardening project at Harborside Academy, a local high school.
