= Dodge Omni =

Dodge Omni Plymouth Horizon
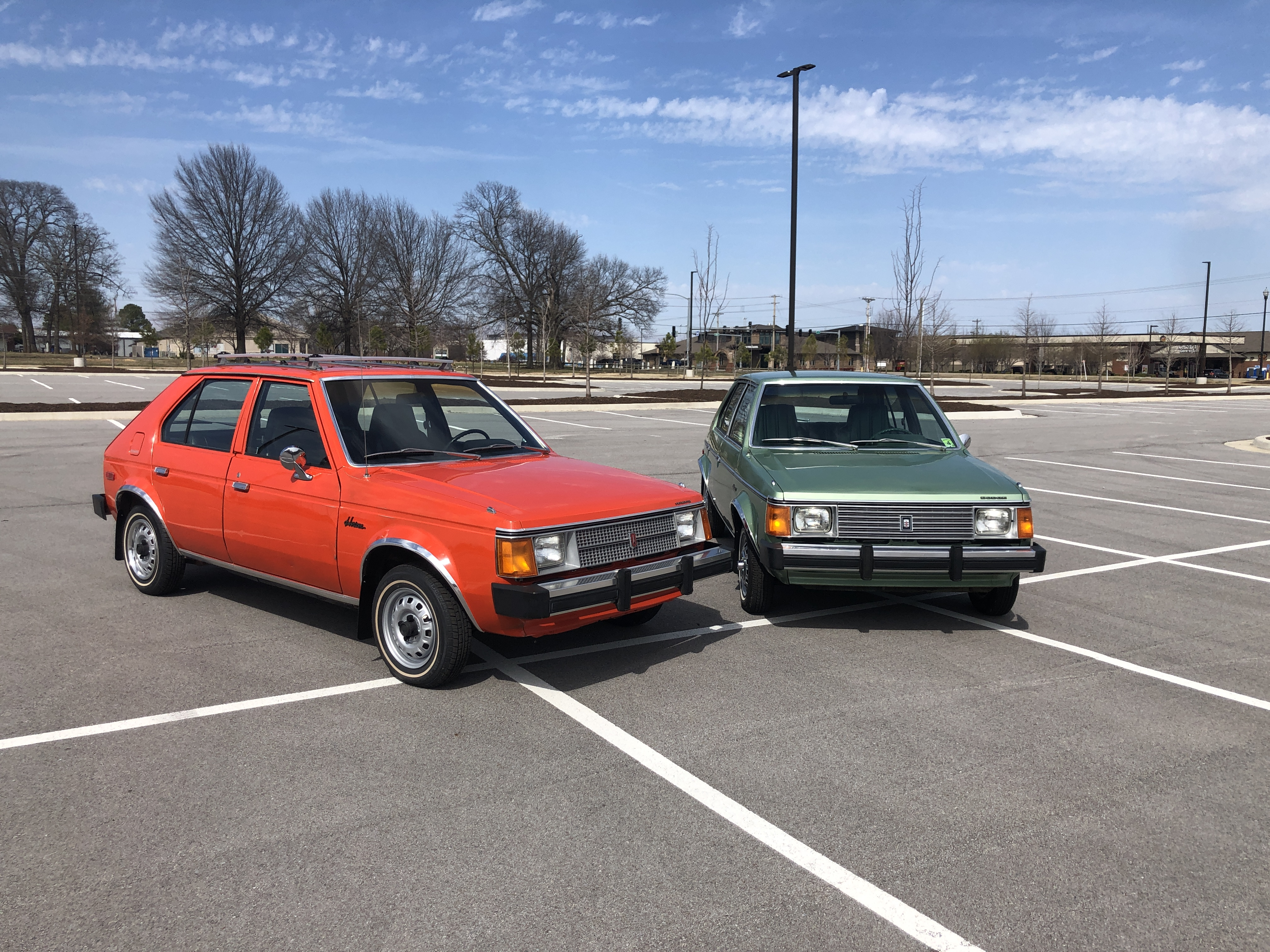
- 1979 Horizon (left) & 1978 Omni (right)

Overview
- Manufacturer: Chrysler Corporation; American Motors (1985–1987)
- Also called: Plymouth Horizon; Dodge/Plymouth Expo (Canada, 1987-1990)
- Production: December 5, 1977 – February 2, 1990
- Model years: 1978–1990
- Assembly: United States: Belvidere, Illinois (Belvidere Assembly Plant: 1977–1987); Kenosha, Wisconsin (AMC Kenosha Plant: 1987–1989); Detroit, Michigan (Jefferson Avenue Assembly: 1989–1990)

Body and chassis
- Class: Subcompact
- Body style: 5-door hatchback
- Layout: Transverse front-engine, front-wheel drive
- Platform: L-body
- Related: Chrysler/Simca/Talbot Horizon; Dodge Charger; Dodge Omni 024; Dodge Rampage; Plymouth Horizon TC3; Plymouth Scamp; Plymouth Turismo; Shelby GLHS

Powertrain
- Engine: 1.6 L Simca 6J I4; 1.7 L Volkswagen EA827 I4; 2.2 L K I4; 2.2 L K Turbo I turbo I4
- Transmission: 4-speed Volkswagen manual 5-speed Chrysler manual 3-speed A404 automatic 3-speed A413 automatic

Dimensions
- Wheelbase: 99.2 in (2,520 mm)
- Length: 163.2 in (4,145 mm)
- Width: 66.2 in (1,681 mm)
- Height: 53.4 in (1,356 mm)
- Curb weight: 1978: 2,137 lb (969 kg)

Chronology
- Successor: Dodge Shadow; Plymouth Sundance

The Dodge Omni (also known as the Plymouth Horizon) is a subcompact car that was manufactured and marketed by Chrysler Corporation from the 1978 to 1990 model years. The first front-wheel drive Chrysler vehicles, the Omni and Horizon were the first American cars sold with front-wheel drive and a transverse-mounted, four-cylinder engine.

The Omni/Horizon were the central model lines of the Chrysler L platform, an evolution of the Chrysler Horizon designed by Chrysler Europe. Heavily inspired by the Volkswagen Rabbit, the model line was sold exclusively as a five-door hatchback. In the 1980s, the L platform chassis architecture subsequently also supported 3-door coupes and a 2-door pickup.

Overshadowed by the introduction of the K-cars, the Omni/Horizon saw few running changes over eleven years of production. While the model line helped Chrysler escape its dire financial situation, its discontinuation was necessitated by advances in front collision requirements. In addition, Chrysler had introduced the Dodge Shadow and Plymouth Sundance hatchback sedans for 1987 to replace the model line, with the Neon replacing both generations for 1993.

From 1977 to 1987, Chrysler manufactured the Omni and Horizon (alongside the entire L platform model range) at its Belvidere Assembly facility (Belvidere, Illinois). In 1987, production shifted to the AMC Kenosha Plant (Kenosha, Wisconsin), finally moving to the Jefferson Avenue Assembly (Detroit, Michigan) facility in 1989. The Omni/Horizon were the final model lines produced at the latter two facilities. In total, approximately 2.5 million vehicles were produced; the Plymouth Horizon is the final Plymouth model to outsell its Dodge counterpart.

== Development ==
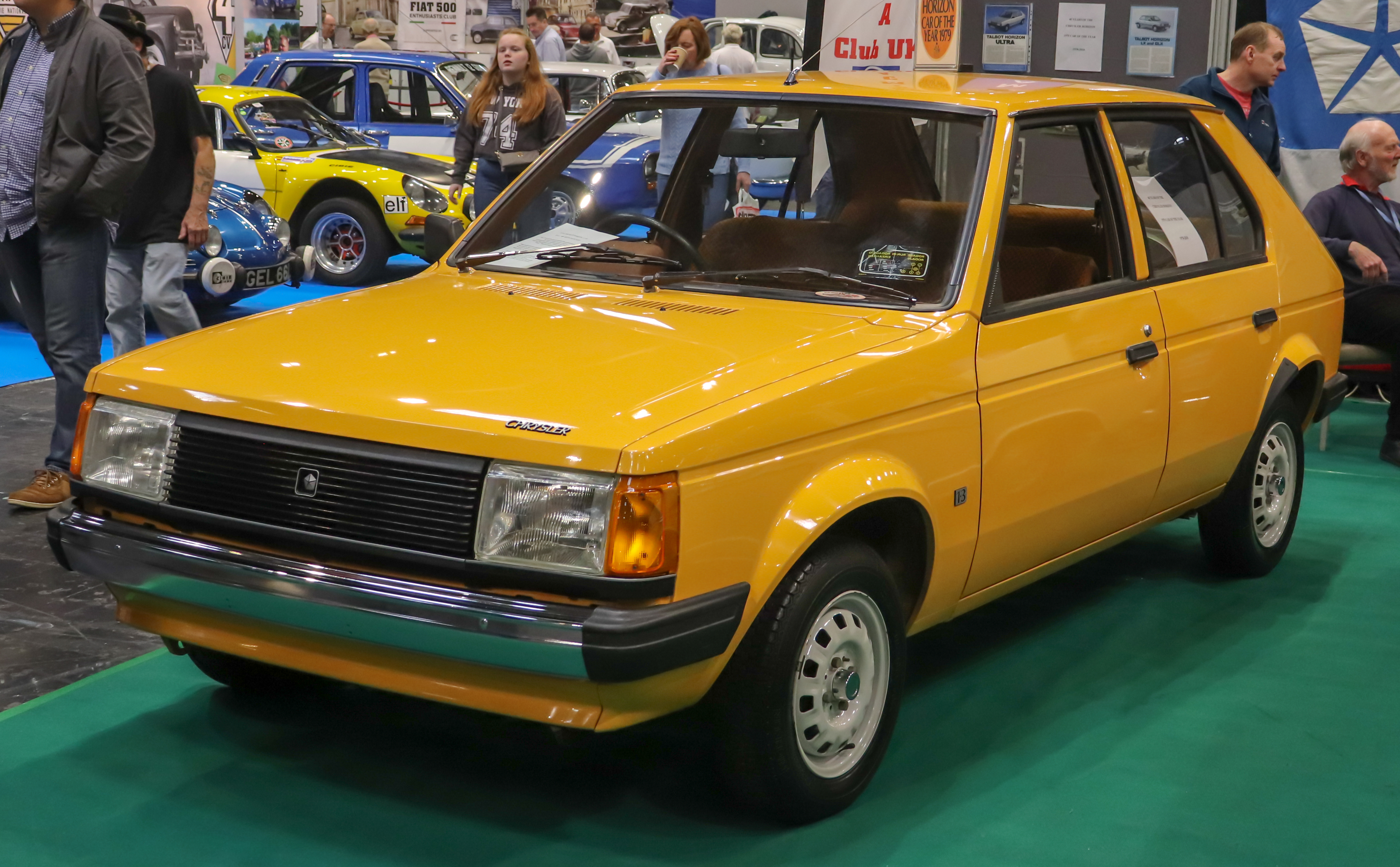
1978 Chrysler Horizon GL (Europe)

=== Background ===
In the early 1970s, Chrysler Corporation had repeatedly announced it would enter the North American small car market to compete with Chevrolet Vega, Ford Pinto and AMC Gremlin, by developing and manufacturing its own domestic small car, known as its Project R-429 — only to repeatedly delay the project.

In an attempt to stave off the U.S. small car competition, the company increased its stake to 77% of Simca in 1963 and had taken control of the Rootes Group by mid-1964, marketing numerous Simca and Rootes models, e.g. the Simca 1204 and Sunbeam Arrow via a new Simca-Rootes Division, formed in 1966 — with 850 dealers selling four Simca models and 400 dealers selling four Rootes models. Results were dismal, and in late 1969, Chrysler announced it would market its Rootes and Simca products directly via its Chrysler-Plymouth Division.

Chrysler introduced its newly developed Hillman Avenger to the U.S. and Canadian market for model years 1971-1973 as the rebadged Plymouth Cricket, directly via its Plymouth dealerships — as a 4-door saloon/sedan (and a 5-door station wagon for MY 1972). The Cricket, and the Mitsubishi-built Colt, marketed concurrently by Dodge dealerships, were both seen in the industry as stop-gap measures until Chrysler could design a small car to be domestically manufactured. The Cricket in particular failed to resonate in the market.

At the same time Chrysler marketed these captive imports, Chrysler executives denounced the concept of subcompact cars, Chrysler's Chairman, Lynn A. Townsend saying "the subcompacts are just too small, the American people won't climb into them. They have to give up too much in creature comfort.

In 1974, Townsend sent an American management team to Chrysler Europe to find a suitable small-car design for the U.S. market, ultimately rejecting a front-wheel drive compact (codenamed C6) as unsuitable for the U.S. production, the design subsequently manufactured in Europe as the Chrysler Alpine. At the end of 1974, Chrysler Europe approved the final clay model design of a shorter wheelbase version (codenamed C2) as a subcompact in the 1.3 L engine range. The C2 project provided multinational Chrysler Europe with a single model line to replace the outdated Simca 1100 and the Hillman Avenger.

The development of the Dodge Omni and Plymouth Horizon began life in 1975. Following the retirement of Townsend, Chrysler management decided to develop an American-market version of the C2 project, working in tandem with Chrysler Europe. While one American design team sought to redevelop the body as a coupe, designers ultimately retained the five-door hatchback, favoring its European-style configuration similar to the five-door Volkswagen Golf.

At the time, Chrysler Europe was splitting design and engineering work between France (chassis, powertrain, and manufacturing) and the United Kingdom (body design and development). Alongside component design for European use, American designers developed the C2 project to comply with local standards. Notably, in order to accommodate its cross-Atlantic development, it was the first project where CAD design drawings were transferred electronically, via satellite.

As part of the dire financial situation of its parent company, Chrysler Europe was sold to PSA Peugeot Citroën in August 1978. As part of the sale, Peugeot phased out the Chrysler brand in Europe in favor of a revived Talbot marque; the rebranded Horizon continued production (nearly unchanged) through 1987.

The sale of Chrysler Europe ended further design work on the C2 project; at the time, the company was seeking to expand the model line to a four-door sedan and a shorter-wheelbase three-door hatchback.

Notably, the front-wheel drive layout at this time had been largely reserved in the U.S. for low-volume luxury cars (including the Cadillac Eldorado and Oldsmobile Toronado). By 1976, Honda (with the Civic and the Accord) and Volkswagen (with the Rabbit) would become the first manufacturers to offer competitive front-wheel drive economy cars in the American market.

=== Transition to American design ===
To further develop the C2 project for the American market, Chrysler Corporation purchased nearly 100 Volkswagen Rabbits in the United States for the purposes of reverse engineering.

At the end of 1977, the C2 project entered production in both Europe and North America, with Chrysler Europe sharing the Horizon nameplate (as the Chrysler-Simca Horizon) with the American Plymouth division. While Chrysler had trailed the AMC Gremlin, Ford Pinto, and Chevrolet Vega to market by eight years, the $2,500 (US$12,300 in 2025) Omni/Horizon provided the company an extensive headstart on its American competitors (which were released in 1981 and 1982, respectively) with the adoption of front-wheel drive, transverse-mount powertrains.

Following the 1978 sale of Chrysler Europe, Chrysler Corporation retained the design rights to its version of the C2 project and continued production in Illinois.

== Model overview ==
The Dodge Omni and Plymouth Horizon are five-door hatchbacks sold in North America. Introduced in January 1978, the model line was developed in tandem with Chrysler Europe, leading to the namesake Chrysler Horizon. Chrysler also sold multiple variants of the model line derived from the same chassis, including 2+2 coupes and coupe utility pickup trucks. The Omni and Horizon appeared at a critical time for Chrysler, when the company was on the brink of bankruptcy and sought government support to survive.

However, the L-bodies miscarried at first, since 1978 was a year of strong sales for larger cars and demand for compacts and subcompacts noticeably shrank. These initial poor sales of the cars contributed to Chrysler's financial woes at the time, but when the company requested federal assistance, the Omni was an important piece of evidence that they were attempting to compete with imports and build small, fuel-efficient cars and might be worth saving. For the three years leading up to the introduction of Chrysler's K-cars, the Omni/Horizon was Chrysler's best selling model line.

Produced nearly unchanged from the 1978 to the 1990 model years, Chrysler had beaten out Ford and General Motors to the market with a domestically produced front-wheel drive car to challenge the VW Rabbit.

=== Chassis ===
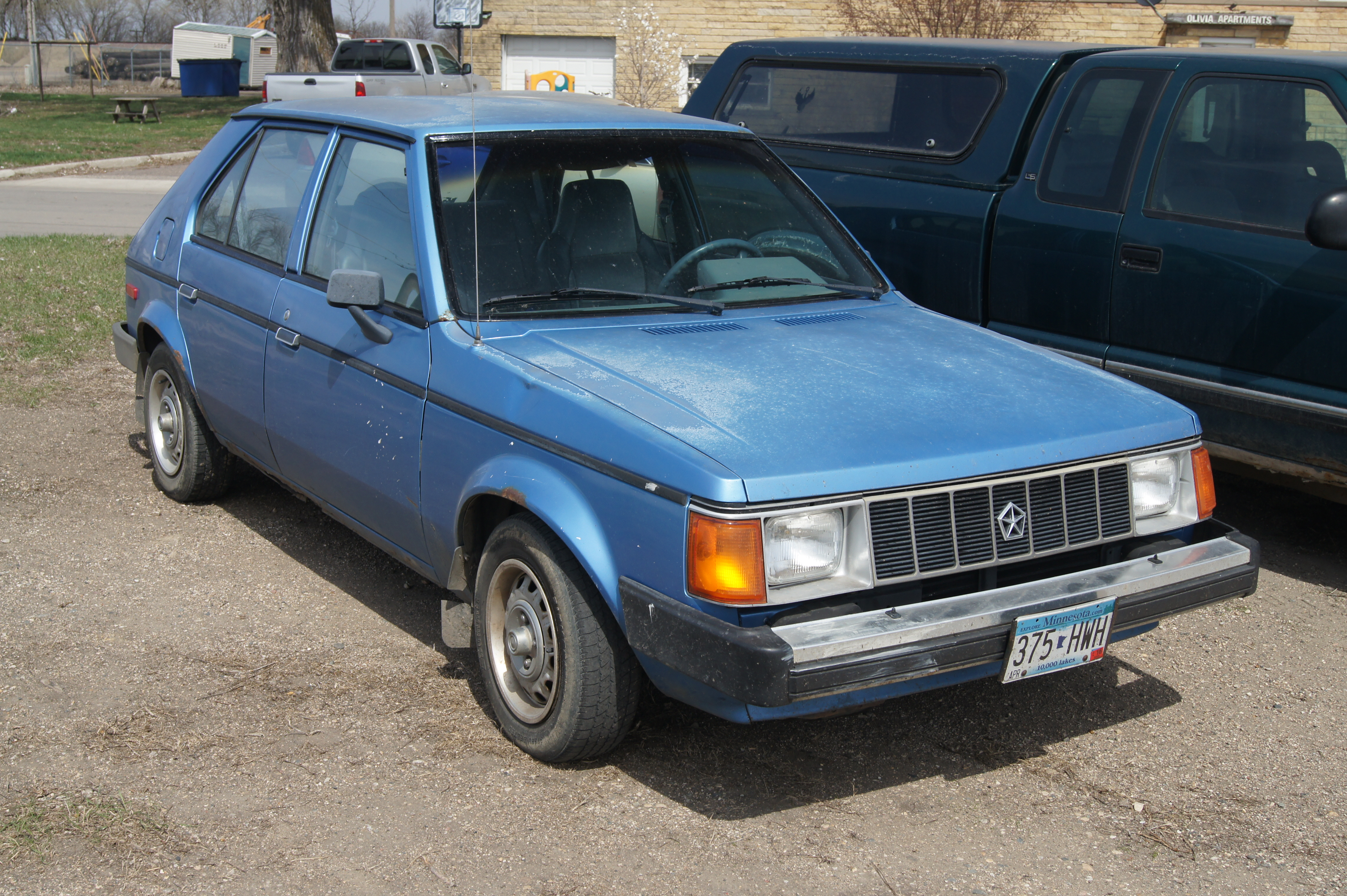

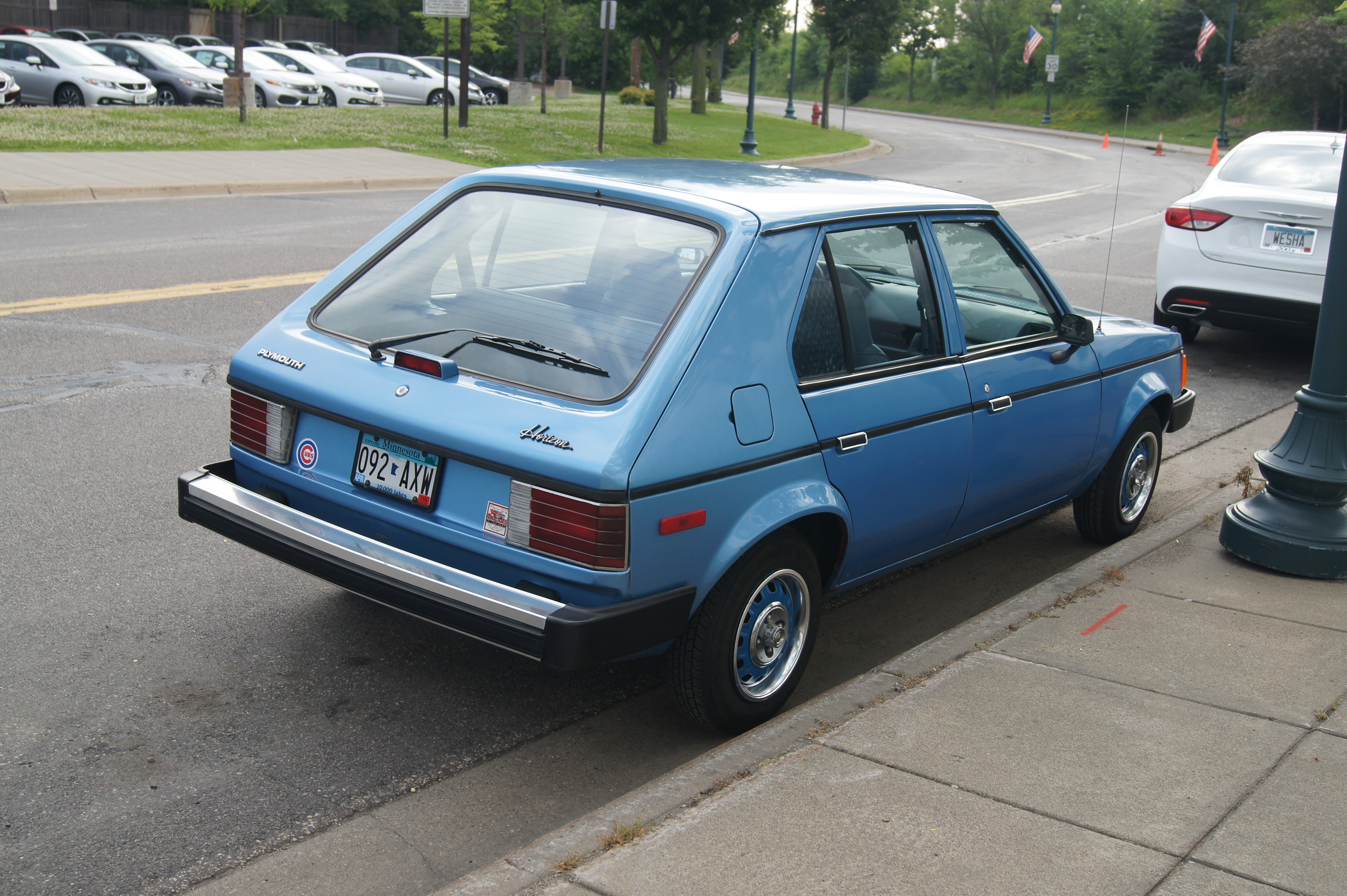
1990 Plymouth Horizon

The Dodge Omni and Plymouth Horizon use the front-wheel drive Chrysler L platform on a 99.2-inch wheelbase (shared with its European namesake). Initially designed by Chrysler Europe, Chrysler Corporation made substantial changes to the suspension design for the American market. In contrast to the Chrysler Horizon, which has a front torsion bar suspension, the model line uses front MacPherson struts. The rear suspension uses a semi-independent twist-beam layout in contrast to the independent trailing arms on the European variant; both are coil-sprung in the rear.

The model line is equipped with power-assisted front disc brakes and rear drum brakes and a rack and pinion steering system.

==== Powertrain ====
While sharing a transverse engine layout, the Dodge Omni and Plymouth Horizon diverge furthest from the Chrysler Horizon in its engine offerings. At the time, Chrysler did not have capability to supply four-cylinder engines for the North American market (of any type), and the Simca-designed 1.1 to 1.4 L engines were deemed insufficient in terms of output. Instead, Chrysler adopted a 75 hp (56 kW; 76 PS) 1.7 L I4, sourced from Volkswagen in the United States with a Chrysler-designed intake manifold. Torque was 90 lb⋅ft (122 N⋅m) and the engine was paired with a 4-speed manual transmission or a 3-speed automatic. At the time of introduction, only the CARB-certified version with an air pump and 70 hp (52 kW) had been available. In 1979 power climbed to 77 hp (57 kW), while by 1980 it dropped to 68 hp (51 kW) and 83 lb⋅ft (113 N⋅m) of torque in all fifty states.

Chrysler's 2.2 L K-car engine appeared for the 1981 model year as an upmarket option to the Volkswagen engine, mated to a new four-speed manual with an overdrive fourth. It produced 84 hp (63 kW) at first, rising to 93 hp (69 kW) in 1986. For 1983, Chrysler introduced a Peugeot-supplied 62 hp (46 kW) 1.6-liter Simca unit as a new base engine (requiring only an alternator to be added by Chrysler); the engine was paired with a manual transmission and the deletion of air conditioning. This engine was related to the Simca/PSA engines available in European Horizons. For 1987, the 1.6 was dropped, with the 2.2-liter becoming the standard engine offering. The 2.2 received fuel injection for 1988, accompanied by three additional horsepower. Latterly, the 2.2 L engine was paired to a 5-speed manual transmission or a 3-speed automatic.

Chrysler had planned on offering PSA's new 1.9-liter diesel in the Omni/Horizon for the 1984 model year. Thanks to the implosion of the diesel market in North America, this never saw the light of day – although the engine was used in the European Horizon. For 1985, Chrysler had planned to build a "fast-burn, high-swirl" 1.8-liter four for the Omni as well as K-cars, but these plans also stalled.

1978–1990 Dodge Omni/Plymouth Horizon Powertrain Details
Engine name	Engine configuration	Production	Output		Notes
Engine name	Engine configuration	Production	Horsepower	Torque	Notes
Volkswagen EA827 I4	1,715 cc (1.7 L; 104.7 cu in) SOHC I4	1978–1983	1978: 70 or 75 hp (52 or 56 kW); 1979: 77 hp (57 kW); 1980: 68 hp (51 kW)	1978: 90 lb⋅ft (122 N⋅m) 1980: 83 lb⋅ft (113 N⋅m)	Engine built by Volkswagen in Germany and supplied to Chrysler. Chrysler installed this engine and designed/installed the carbureted induction system. Volkswagen 4-speed manual; Chrysler A404 3-speed automatic
Peugeot/Simca 6J I4	1,592 cc (1.6 L; 97.1 cu in) OHV I4	1983–1986	62 hp (46 kW)	85 lb⋅ft (115 N⋅m)	Simca-designed engine supplied by Peugeot; alternator added by Chrysler 4/5-speed manual only
Chrysler K I4	2,213 cc (2.2 L; 135.0 cu in) SOHC I4	1981–1990	1981: 84 hp (63 kW); 1986: 93 hp (69 kW); 1988: 96 hp (72 kW)	1981: 111 lb⋅ft (150 N⋅m); 1986: 119 lb⋅ft (161 N⋅m); 1988: 122 lb⋅ft (165 N⋅m)	Shared with Chrysler K cars (and later minivans) 4/5-speed manual; Chrysler A413 3-speed automatic
Chrysler K High Output I4	2,213 cc (2.2 L; 135.0 cu in) SOHC I4	1984–1985	110 hp (82 kW)	129 lb⋅ft (175 N⋅m)	Dodge Omni GLH (naturally-aspirated); shared with Dodge Shelby Charger 5-speed manual only
Chrysler K Turbo I I4	2,213 cc (2.2 L; 135.0 cu in) SOHC I4, single turbocharger	1985–1986	GLH-T: 146 hp (109 kW); GLHS: 175 hp (130 kW)	GLH-T: 170 lb⋅ft (230 N⋅m); GLHS: 175 lb⋅ft (237 N⋅m)	Dodge Omni GLH-T, GLH-S (turbocharged) 5-speed manual only

=== Body ===
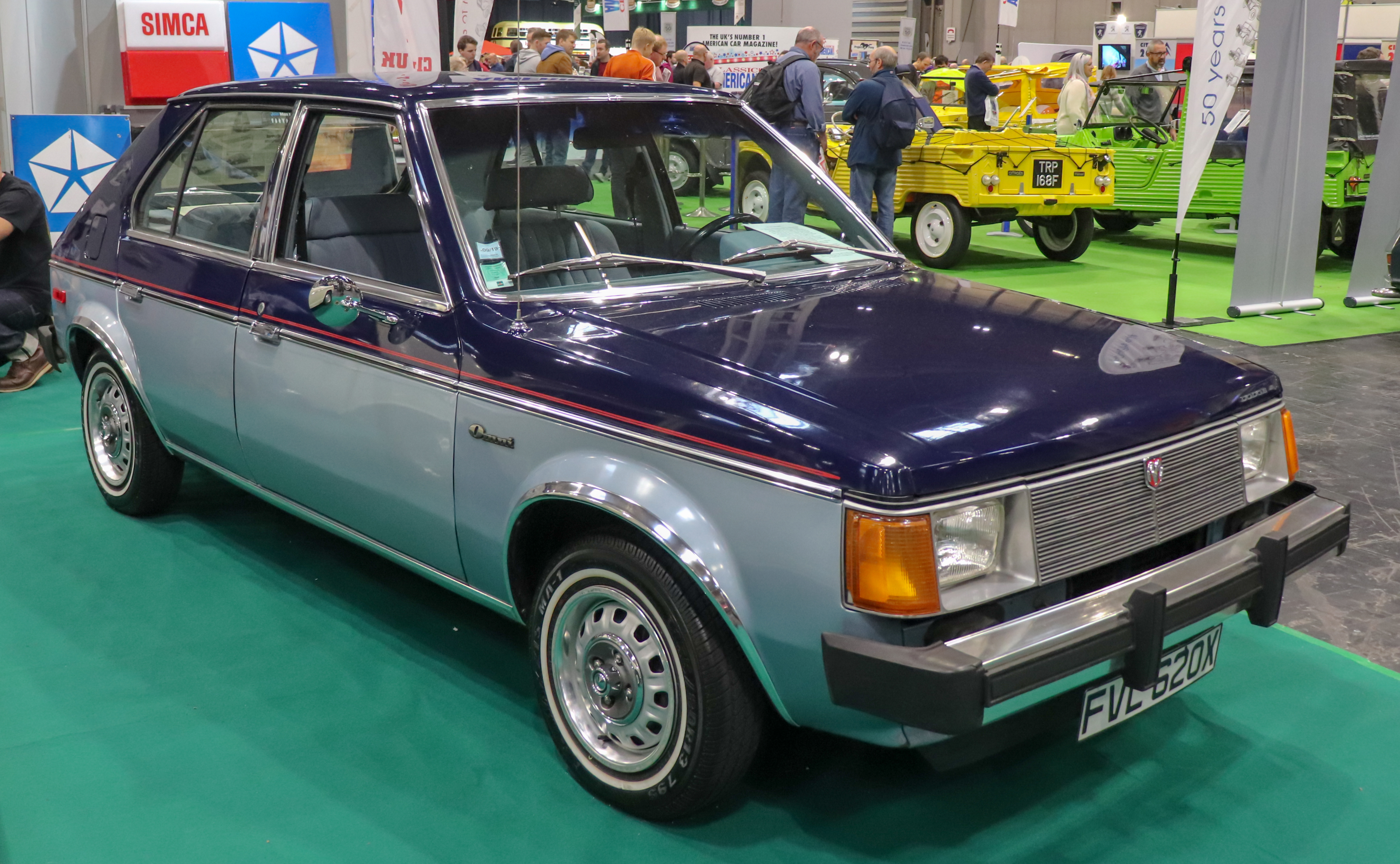
1981 Dodge Omni

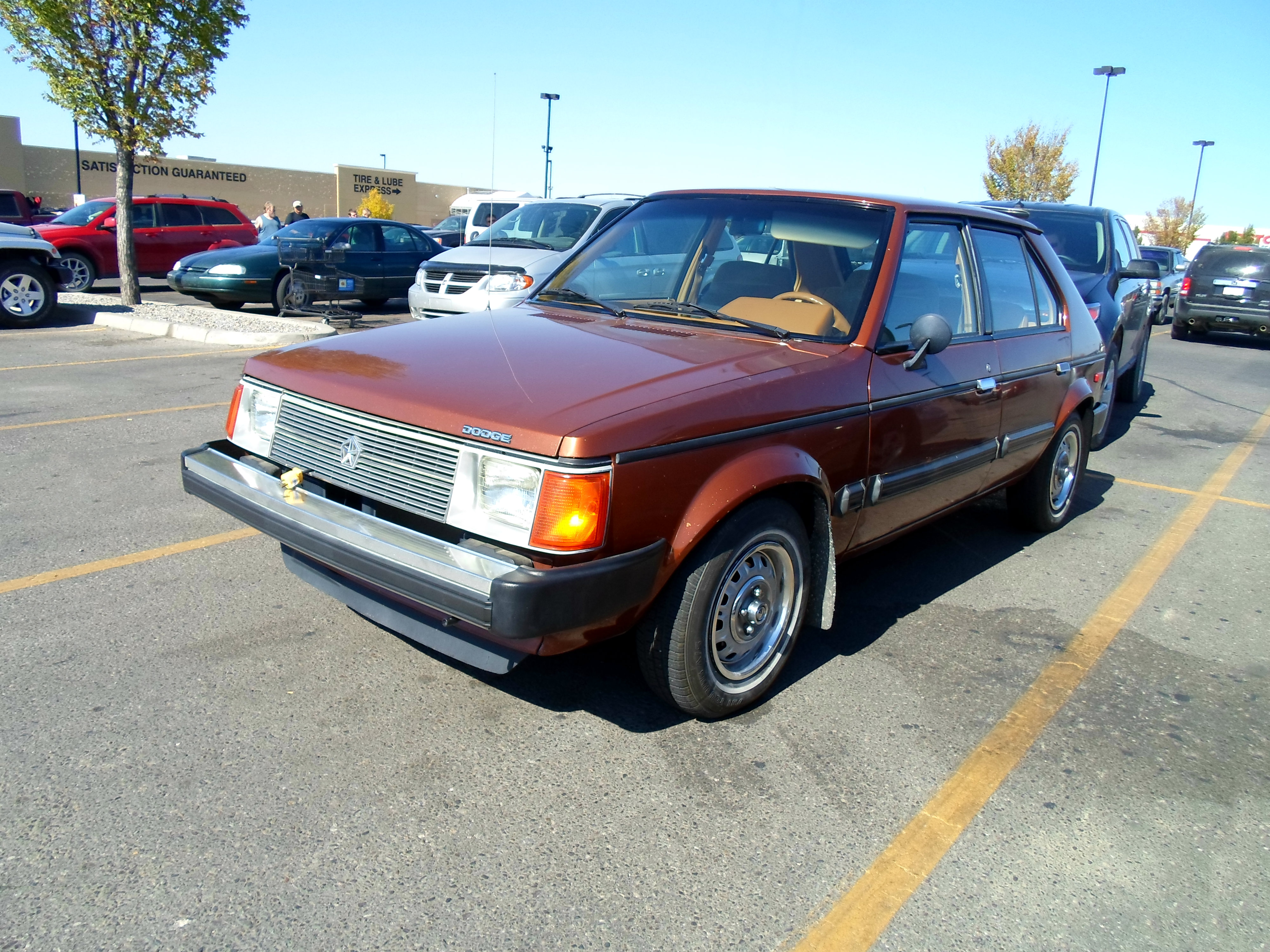
1986–1989 Dodge Omni

While sharing a visually similar appearance with its Chrysler Europe counterpart, the Omni/Horizon shares almost no body commonality. Along with the American requirement of sealed-beam headlamps, 5-mph bumpers, the body stampings are not shared between the two model line; for example, the joint between the roof and A-pillar on the American model line is welded together (on the European version, it is a single stamping). On the Omni/Horizon, the rear door windows do not roll down completely; the corresponding version of the Chrysler Horizon does (through a higher-cost, more complex design).

With the exception of grilles, taillamps, and model badging, the Dodge Omni and Plymouth Horizon were largely indistinguishable from one another. For 1984, the model line underwent a minor revision. Distinguished by revised exterior badging, the revision phased out a large degree of chrome exterior trim in favor of black-painted trim. The interior received a redesigned dashboard (a Rallye dashboard with full instrumentation was introduced as an option) and new seats; a 5-speed manual transmission became standard. For 1987, to streamline production, all vehicles received an instrument panel with tachometer, oil pressure, and voltmeter gauges.

For 1990, the Omni and Horizon underwent several minor revisions. Chrysler invested in a number of significant changes that ended up being used for only one year; the cars gained larger exterior rear-view mirrors borrowed from the departed M-body sedans in lieu of the original round units, and, to comply with federal passive-restraint regulations, a driver-side airbag was added along with rear-seat outboard shoulder belts. The instrument panel was mildly redesigned, complete with HVAC controls moved to the center, taking the place of the radio (which took the place of the ashtray).

=== Trim levels ===
In contrast to many Chrysler model lines, the Dodge Omni and Plymouth Horizon were largely sold across a single trim level. For 1981 and 1982, Chrysler introduced a "Miser" version; this lightly equipped version was developed to increase fuel economy, including an overdrive manual transmission.

For 1984, the SE (Sport Edition) option was introduced, which consisted of two-tone exterior paint. From 1984 to 1986, the Carroll Shelby Omni GLH, GLH-T, and GLHS (see below) were high-performance turbocharged versions of the Omni hatchback.

For 1987, Dodge introduced the America trim level of the Omni to compete with recent low-priced imports such as the Yugo and the Hyundai Excel. To offer the vehicle as the lowest-price American-assembled subcompact, Chrysler reduced the exterior paint and interior color configurations, the number of options to two (air conditioning and a radio, three options if the California emissions package is included) and option packages to only two, while cutting the profit margin. Suppliers, United Auto Workers, Chrysler dealers, and had the State of Illinois also made concessions to lower the price of the car. Dodge was thus able to drop the MSRP from $6,209 to $5,499, with "$684 of added equipment at no cost" according to Chrysler. The break-even point of the Omni America was 170,000 cars.

== Production ==
From 1977 to 1987, Chrysler Corporation assembled the Omni and Horizon hatchbacks at its Belvidere Assembly Plant (Belvidere, Illinois); the facility assembled the entire line of L-body vehicles, including the Dodge Omni 024, Plymouth Horizon TC3, Dodge Charger, Plymouth Turismo, Dodge Rampage, and Plymouth Scamp.

In 1985, Chrysler entered an agreement with American Motors Corporation (AMC) to produce Chrysler M-body vehicles at its Kenosha, Wisconsin facility (supplementing AMC production of Renault-badged vehicles). In 1987, Chrysler and AMC agreed to add the Omni/Horizon to the contract; for 1988, it had discontinued the L-body Charger/Turismo and Belvidere Assembly was being retooled for the production of the AC-body/AY-body sedans (Dodge Dynasty to the Chrysler Imperial). M-body sedans were built at the Kenosha Main plant, while L-bodies were built at Kenosha Lakefront.

At the end of December 1988, Chrysler ended automobile production in the AMC Kenosha facilities, relocating Omni/Horizon production to its Jefferson Avenue facility.

Production Figures:

Dodge Omni Production Figures
	Hatchback	024	GLH	Yearly Total
1978	70,971	-	-	70,971
1979	71,556	46,781	-	118,337
1980	67,279	51,731	-	119,010
1981	78,875	35,983	–	114,858
1982	31,210	26,234	–	57,444
1983	42,554	–	–	42,554
1984	68,070	–	–	68,070
1985	67,614	–	6,513	74,127
1986	69,951	–	3,629	73,580
1987	66,907	–	–	66,907
1988	59,887	–	–	59,887
1989	37,720	–	–	37,720
1990	16,531	–	–	16,531
Total	749,125	160,729	10,142	919,996

Plymouth Horizon Production Figures
	Hatchback	TC3/Turismo	Yearly Total
1978	95,817	-	95,817
1979	86,214	54,249	140,463
1980	85,751	59,527	145,278
1981	83,008	56,773	139,781
1982	37,196	37,856	75,052
1983	46,471	32,065	78,536
1984	78,564	49,716	128,280
1985	88,011	52,162	140,173
1986	84,508	46,387	130,895
1987	79,449	24,104	103,553
1988	61,715	–	61,715
1989	37,794	–	37,794
1990	16,034	–	16,034
Total	880,532	412,839	1,293,371

== Variants ==
Following the introduction of the five-door Omni/Horizon, Chrysler introduced several additional versions of the L-body platform, including the Dodge 024/Plymouth TC3 three-door hatchbacks (later the Dodge Charger/Plymouth Turismo) and the Dodge Rampage/Plymouth Scamp coupé utility pickup truck.

As a hot hatch, Chrysler introduced the turbocharged Omni GLH (later the Shelby GLH-S).

=== Dodge Omni 024/Dodge Charger ===
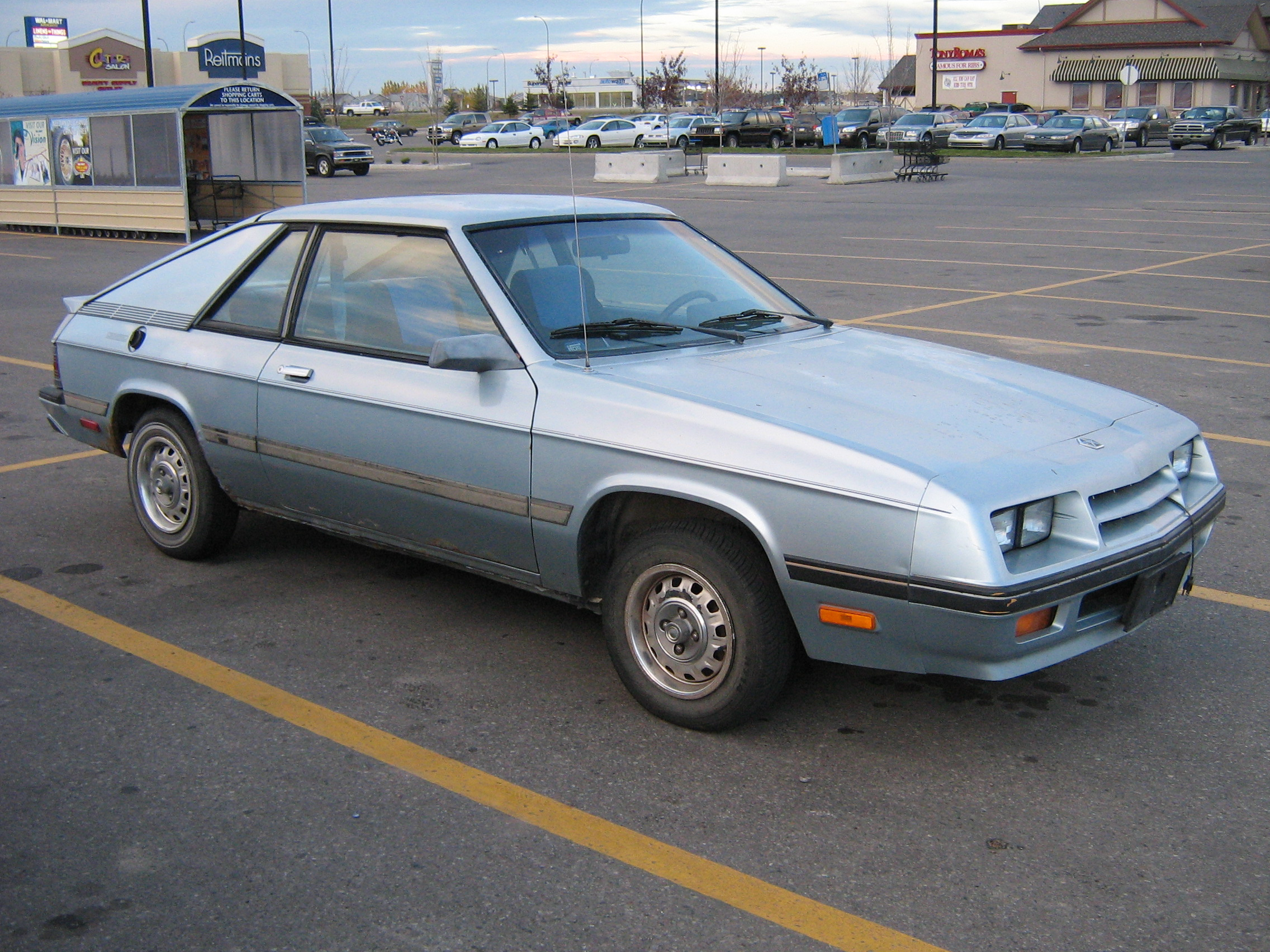
1984–1987 Dodge Charger

For 1979, Chrysler introduced a hatchback coupe version of the Omni/Horizon, named the Dodge Omni 024 and Plymouth Horizon TC3. Using an L-body chassis (shortened to a 96.6-inch wheelbase), the 024/TC3 coupes shared no external bodywork with the five-door hatchbacks. Sharing the same powertrain as the Omni and Horizon, the coupes were largely designed for appearance over performance.

For 1982, the O24/TC3 were renamed Dodge Charger and Plymouth Turismo. While again offering the same powertrain as the five-door hatchbacks, the 2.2 L high-output engine was added to create the Dodge Shelby Charger/Plymouth Turismo Duster. For 1984, the coupes received updated exterior styling (distinguished by a quad-headlamp front fascia). For 1985 and 1986, the Shelby Charger adopted the 146 hp (109 kW) engine of the Omni GLH-T.

Following the 1987 model year, the Dodge Charger/Plymouth Turismo were replaced by the Dodge Shadow/Plymouth Sundance; Dodge would not again remarket a Charger until the 2005 model year. The final 1000 Dodge Shelby Chargers were built as Shelby Charger GLHS vehicles with a 175 hp (130 kW) 2.2 L Turbo II engine, upgraded transmission, brakes, and suspension, and the deletion of all Dodge badging.

=== Dodge Rampage/Plymouth Scamp ===
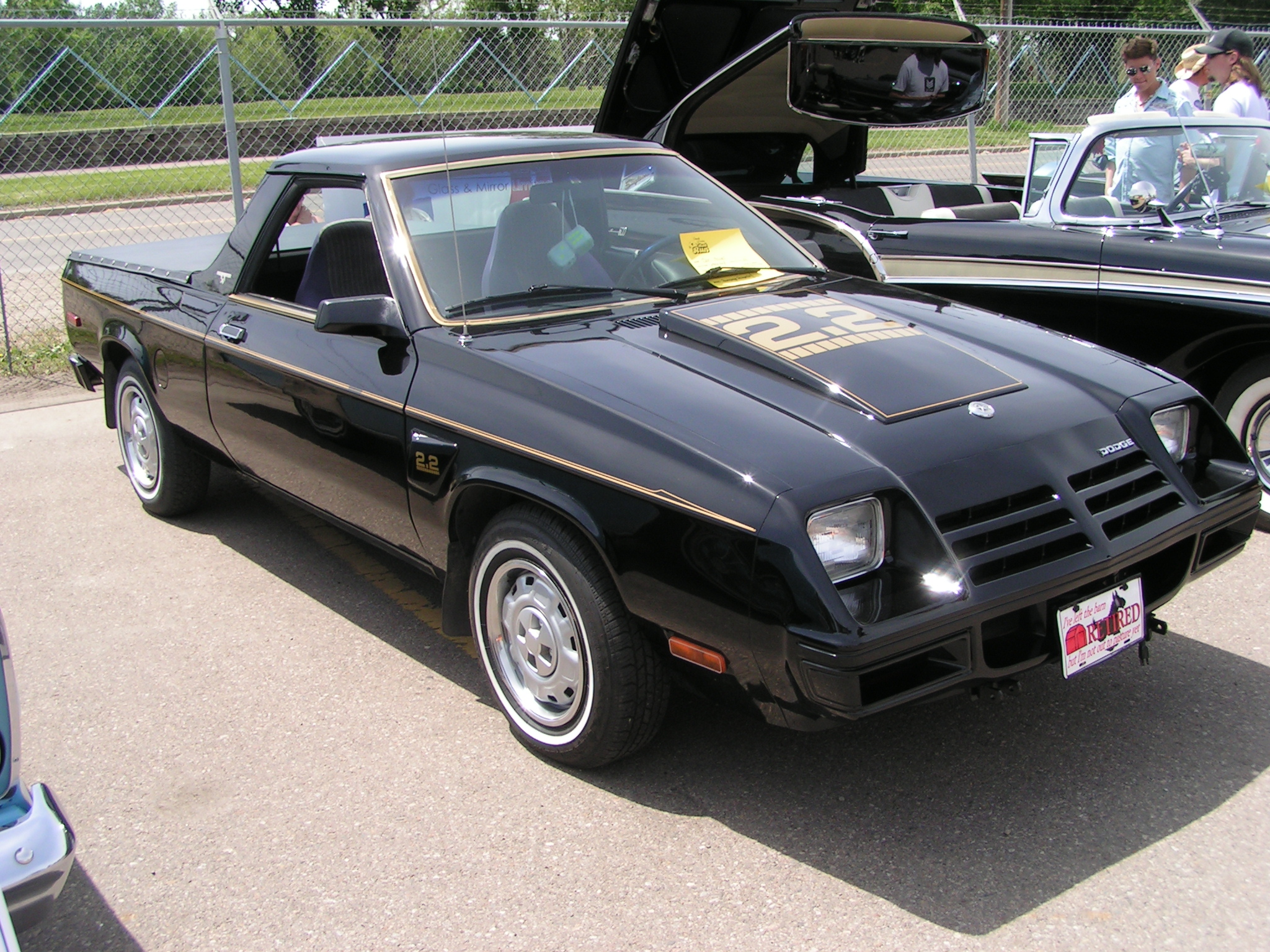
1983 Dodge Rampage

For 1982, Chrysler introduced a coupe utility pickup derived from the L-body chassis, named the Dodge Rampage. The first front-wheel drive American pickup truck, the Rampage extended the Dodge Omni chassis to a 104.2-inch wheelbase. To compete with the payload of the larger Chevrolet El Camino, Chrysler redesigned the rear frame and suspension of the L-body for the Rampage, with the vehicle receiving a leaf-sprung rear axle.

For 1983 the Plymouth Scamp was introduced alongside the Dodge Rampage, distinguished primarily by badging and trim; the Scamp was offered only for 1983. For 1984, the Rampage received the quad-headlight front fascia of the Dodge Charger and block-letter badging.

=== Dodge Omni GLH ===
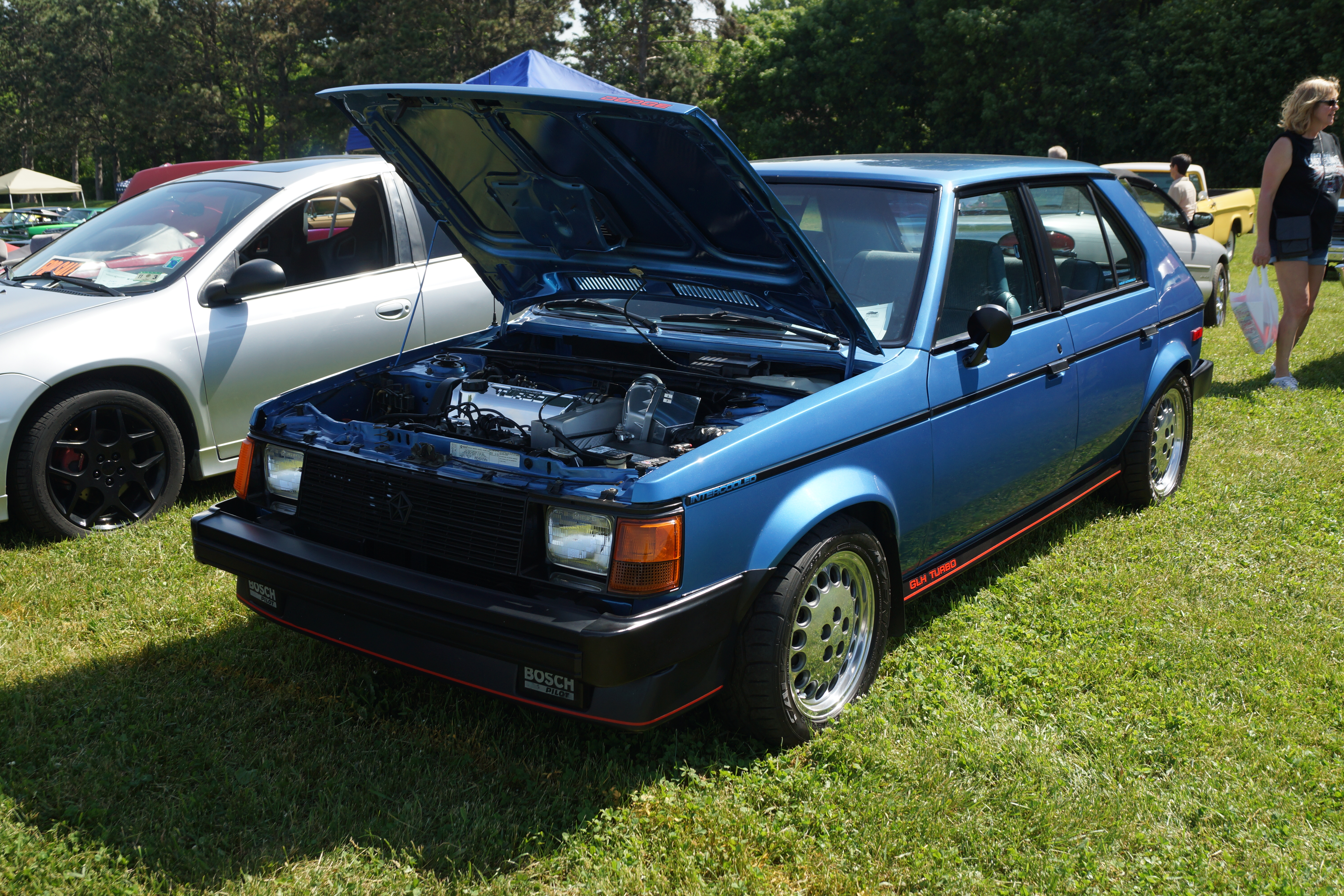
1985 Dodge Omni GLH-T

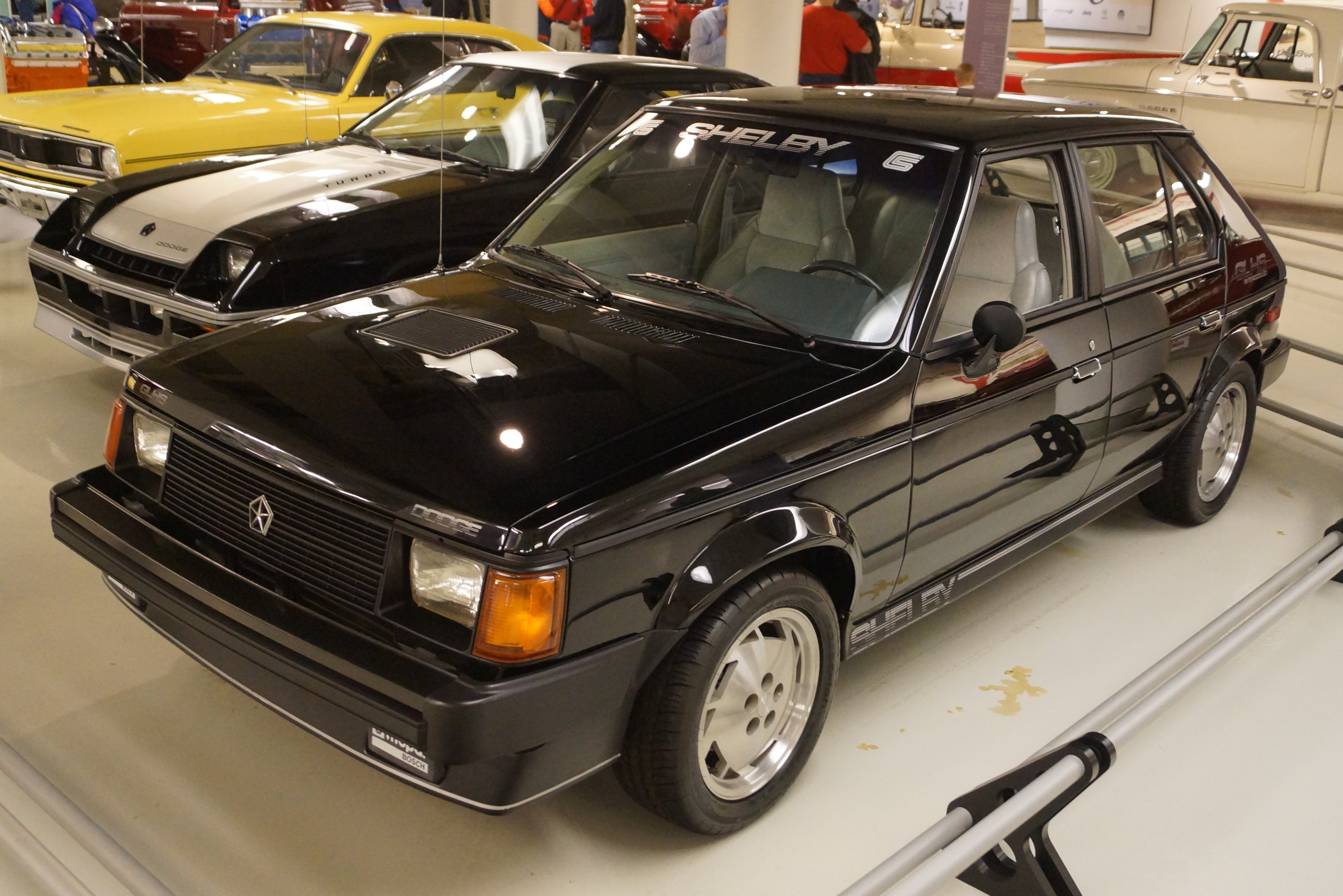
1986 Shelby GLHS

The highest-performance Dodge Omni was the 1984–1986 Omni GLH, modified by Carroll Shelby. Following the rejection of "Coyote" by Chrysler, the initials GLH ("Goes Like Hell", the choice of Carroll Shelby) were used instead.

For 1984, the Omni GLH adopted many of the modifications of the 1983 Shelby Charger, including its 110 hp (82 kW) 2.2 L "high-output" I4, stiffer suspension, larger brakes and wider tires. For 1985 and 1986, Shelby offered the GLH with an optional 146 hp (109 kW) 2.2 L Turbo I I4 (GLH-T); 1986 vehicles are largely distinguished by their center brake light.

==== Shelby GLH-S ====
Shelby Automobiles purchased the final 500 1986 GLH-T (all in black) and used them as the basis for the 1986 Shelby GLHS ("Goes Like Hell S'more"). Modified by the company in California, the GLHS vehicles were legally sold as Shelbys. The Turbo I engine underwent extensive modification, adopting multiple components of what would become the Turbo II engine introduced for 1987. Along with an intercooler, the engine received a larger turbocharger and throttle body, tuned intake and exhaust manifolds, a new wiring harness, and a new radiator and engine fan (among other engine modifications). The suspension was upgraded further, receiving stiffer springs, and adjustable Koni struts and shocks, along with larger tires mounted on Shelby-designed wheels. In contrast to the red pinstripes of the GLH/GLH-T, the GLHS used silver pinstripes and badging; a "Shelby" decal was added to the windshield and a large GLHS decal was added to the driver-side C-pillar (the passenger-side C-pillar was occupied by the gas cap door).

== Legacy ==
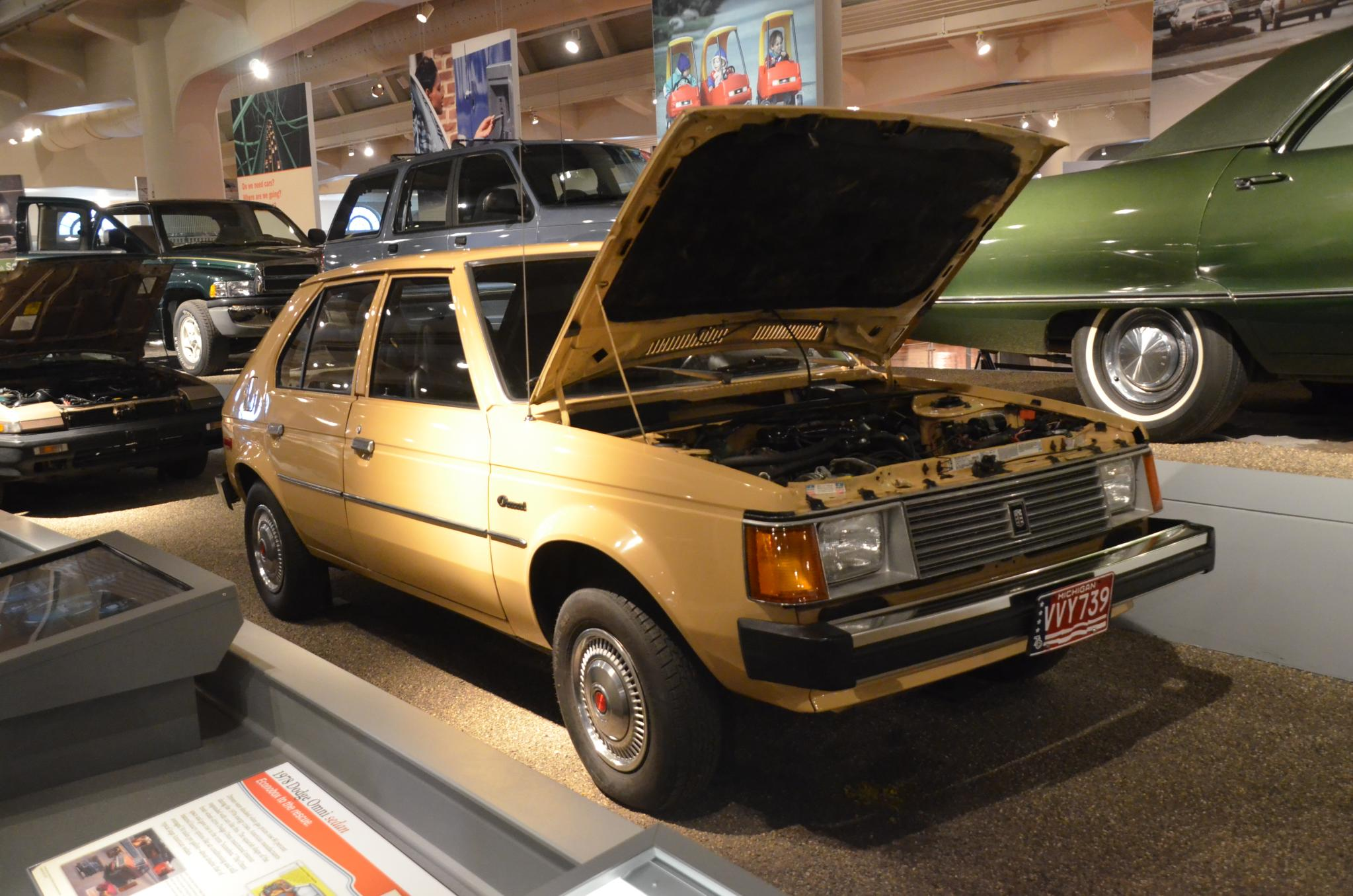
1978 Dodge Omni at The Henry Ford

At the time of its 1978 launch, the Omni and Horizon would play a significant role in the survival of Chrysler Corporation. While initially struggling against rebounding sales of larger vehicles, nearly 200,000 examples of the combined model line were sold in the first model year. In contrast to most Chrysler model lines, the Plymouth Horizon would outsell the Dodge Omni (some years, by a significant margin), with the exception of the final 1989 and 1990 model years.

As the Omni/Horizon became the best-selling Chrysler model line between 1978 and 1980, it would play a major role in Chrysler securing government-backed funding in 1979. The model line was evidence that Chrysler was attempting to develop more fuel-efficient vehicles competitive with automakers around the world. Along with ensuring the continued survival of the company, the $1.5 billion loans ($6.65 billion in 2025) allowed Chrysler to finish the development of its compact/mid-size K-Car program and its minivans, two of its most profitable model lines during the 1980s.

== Awards ==
Following its launch, the Dodge Omni was awarded the 1978 Motor Trend Car of the Year Award. In a similar fashion, the 1978 Chrysler Horizon was voted European Car of the Year for 1979.

== Consumer Reports review ==
Shortly after their introduction, Consumer Reports tested the Omni and Horizon and reported that it lost control in hard maneuvering. As front-wheel-drive cars were still considered a new idea in the American automotive industry, the allegation received extensive mainstream coverage, including a piece in Time magazine. Other automotive media reported no problems and said the Consumer Reports test did not approximate real-world driving conditions. In response to the Consumer Reports article, Chrysler modified the car to add a steering damper and a lighter-weight steering wheel.
