= List of Plymouth vehicles =

This is a list of automobiles sold under the Plymouth brand name of the Chrysler Corporation.

== Passenger cars ==
Exterior	Name	Year Introduced	Year Discontinued	Platforms	Generation	Vehicle Information
	De Luxe	1933	1950		1	Full-size car. Special De Luxe was an upper trim model
	Suburban	1949	1961		2	Station wagon
	Cambridge	1951	1953		1	Full-size car, middle range model
	Concord	1951	1952		1	Full-size car, least expensive model
	Cranbrook	1951	1953		1	Full-size car, top-range model
	Belvedere	1954	1970	Chrysler B platform	7	Top line model, 1954-1955, Mid-range model full-size car until 1965; intermediate car until 1970
	Plaza	1954	1958		1	Entry-level car
	Savoy	1954	1964	Chrysler B platform	5	Full-size car, least expensive model
	Fury	1956	1978	Chrysler C platform Chrysler B platform	7	Top-range full-size (1956–1961, 1965–1974) and mid-size (1962–1964, 1975–1978) car, Sport Fury upper trim was available in 1959 and 1962–1971, VIP luxury trim was available in 1966–1969
	Valiant	1960	1976	Chrysler A platform	3	Compact car
	Barracuda	1964	1974	Chrysler A platform Chrysler E platform	3	Two-door muscle car
	Satellite	1965	1974	Chrysler B platform	3	Mid-size car, upper trim model of Belvedere
	GTX	1966	1971	Chrysler B platform	3	Upper-trim mid-size muscle car
	Road Runner	1968	1980	Chrysler B platform	3	Basic-trim mid-size muscle car
	Duster	1970	1976	Chrysler A platform	1	Two-door sports car
	Superbird	1970	1970	Chrysler B platform	1	Two-door race car / muscle car
	Cricket	1971	1973			Subcompact car, rebadged Hillman Avenger
	Colt	1974	1994		6	Compact / subcompact car, rebadged Mitsubishi Mirage
	Trail Duster	1974	1981	Chrysler AD platform	1	SUV
	Voyager / Grand Voyager	1974	2000	Chrysler S platform Chrysler AS platform Chrysler NS platform	3	Full-size van (1974–1983) and minivan (1984–2000)
	Gran Fury	1975	1989	Chrysler C platform Chrysler R platform Chrysler M platform	3	Full-size (1975–1981) and top range mid-size (1982–1989) car
	Volaré	1976	1980	Chrysler F platform	1	Compact car
	Arrow	1976	1980		1	Compact car, rebadged Mitsubishi Lancer Celeste
	Horizon	1978	1990	Chrysler L platform	1	Subcompact car, called Plymouth Expo in Canada
	Sapporo	1978	1983		1	Sports car, rebadged Mitsubishi Galant Lambda
	Arrow Truck	1979	1982		1	Two-door truck, rebadged Mitsubishi Forte
	Champ	1979	1982		1	Subcompact car, rebadged Mitsubishi Mirage
	TC3	1979	1982	Chrysler L platform	1	Subcompact car
	Reliant	1981	1989	Chrysler K Platform	1	Mid-size car, least expensive model
	Caravelle	1983	1988	Chrysler E platform (Sedan); Chrysler K Platform (Coupe)	1	Mid-size car, middle range model. First introduced in Canada in 1983 and then came to the United States in 1985
	Scamp	1983	1983	Chrysler L platform	1	2-door truck, rebadged Dodge Rampage
	Turismo	1983	1987	Chrysler L platform	1	Subcompact car succeeding TC3
	Colt Vista	1984	1994		1	Compact MPV, rebadged Mitsubishi Chariot
	Conquest	1984	1986		1	Sports car, rebadged Mitsubishi Starion
	Sundance	1987	1994	Chrysler P platform	1	Compact car succeeding Turismo
	Acclaim	1989	1995	Chrysler A platform	1	Mid-size sedan replacing Caravelle and Reliant
	Laser	1990	1994	Chrysler D platform	1	Sports coupe
	Neon	1994	2001	Chrysler PL platform	2	Compact car succeeding Sundance
	Breeze	1996	2000	Chrysler JA platform	1	Mid-size sedan succeeding Acclaim
	Prowler	1997	2001	Chrysler PR platform	1	Sports car

== Trucks ==
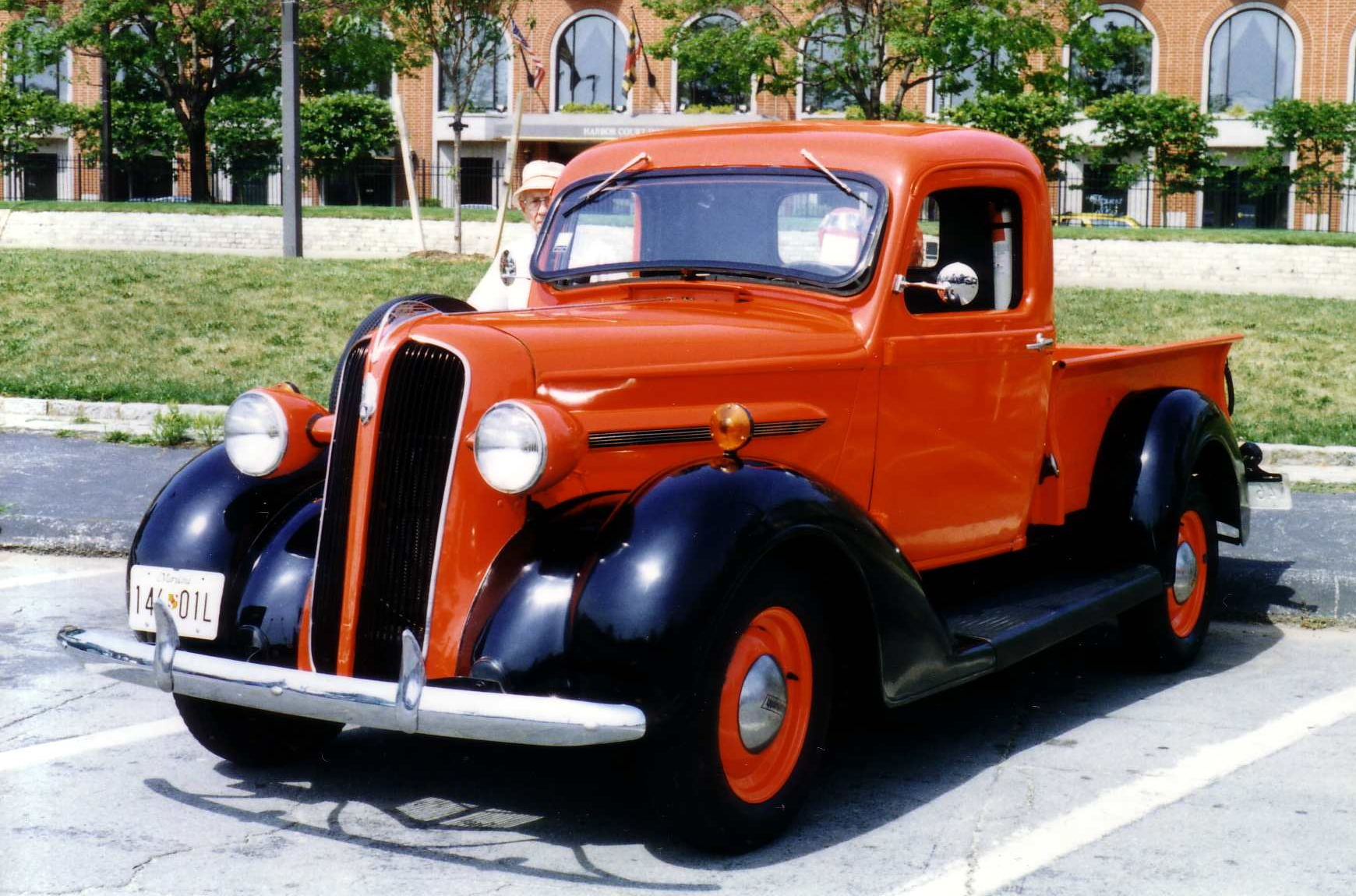
Plymouth PT-50 pickup truck

- PV-Sedan Delivery
- PT-50
- PT-57
- PT-81
- PT-105
- PT-125
- P-14-S

== Concept cars ==
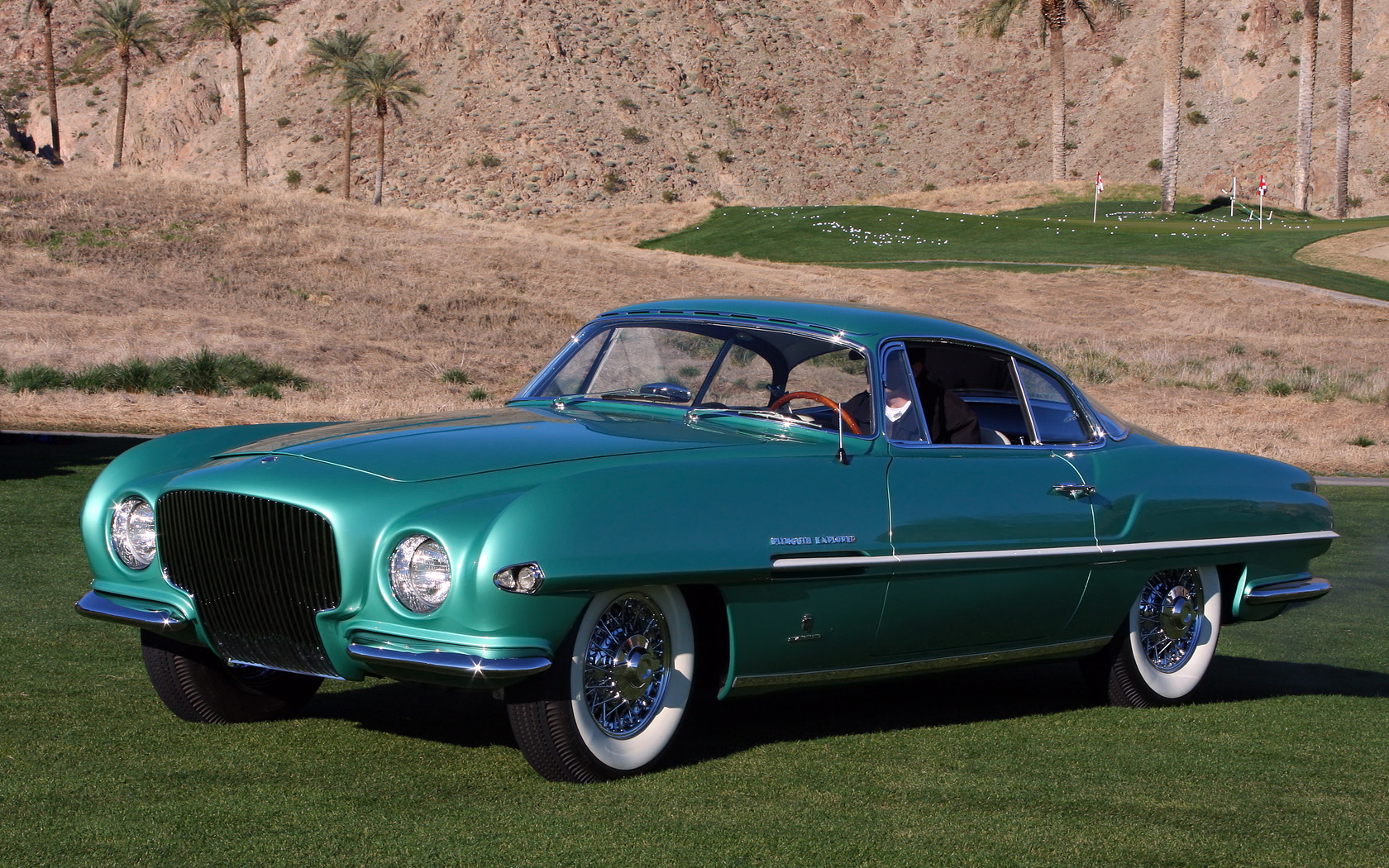
1954 Plymouth Explorer

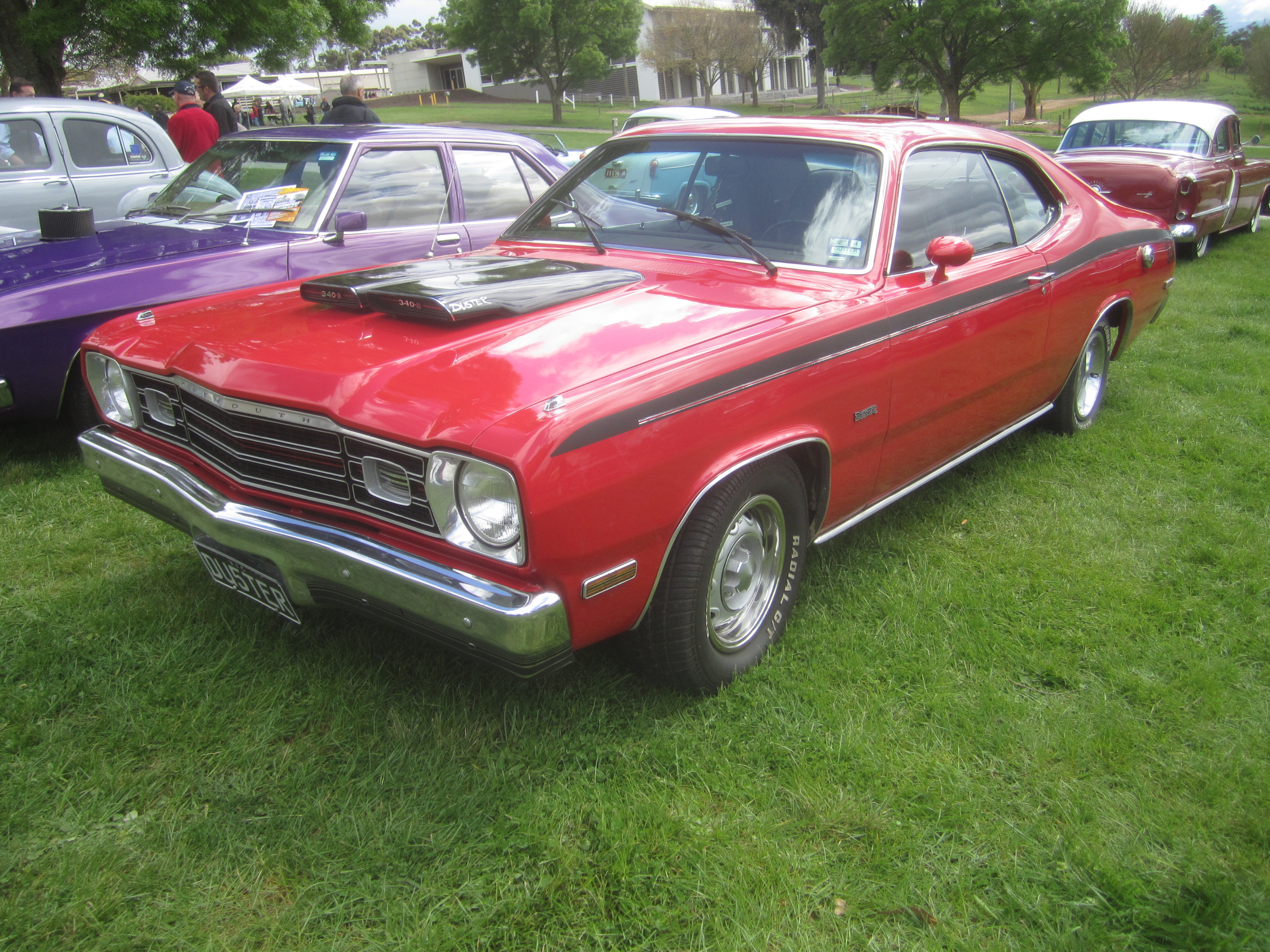
1973 Plymouth (Rapid Transit System) Duster 340

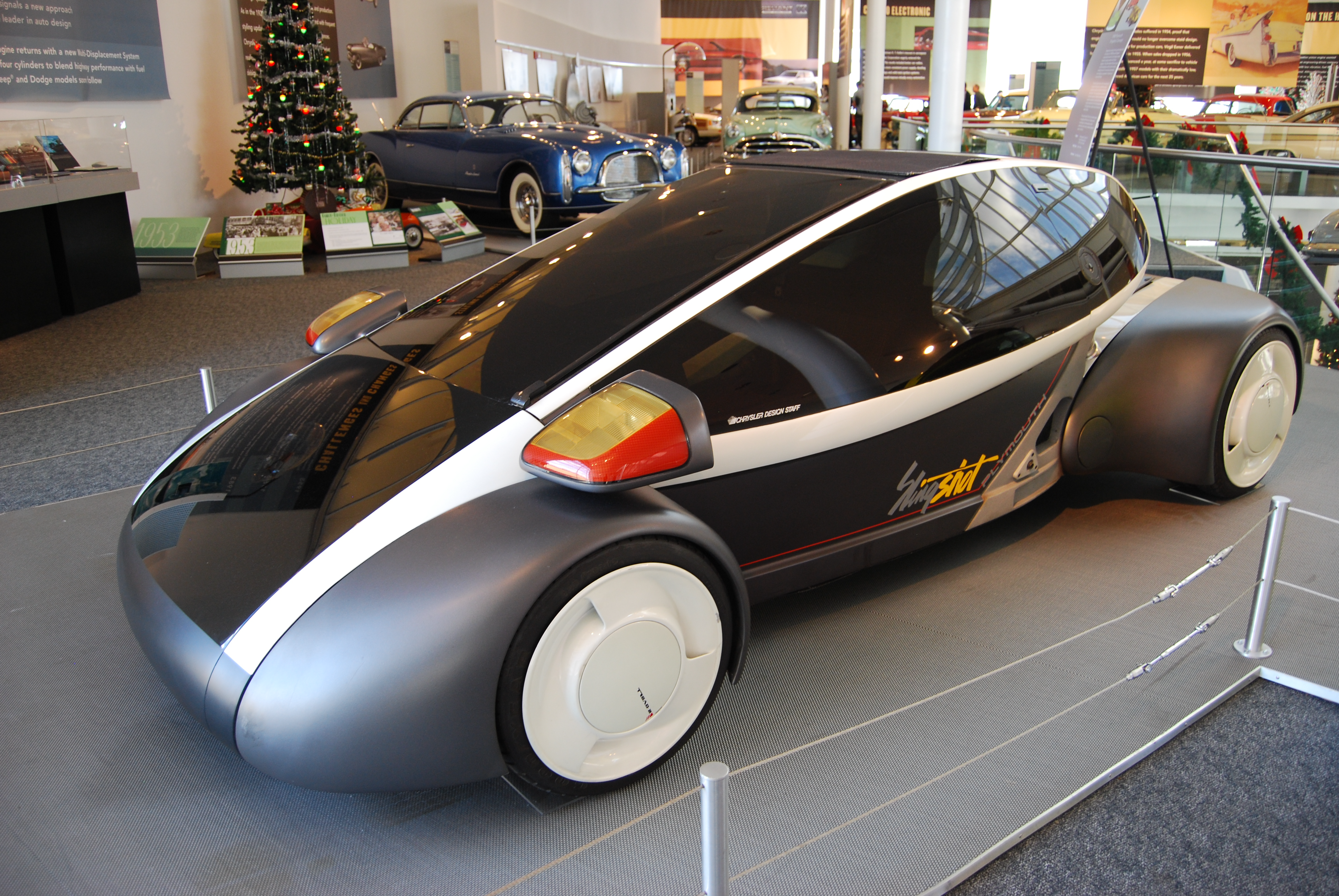
1988 Plymouth Slingshot

Model	Year	Type	Specifications	Features
Plymouth XX-500	1950	Sedan		
Plymouth Belmont	c.1953	2-seater Convertible	3.9L 150 hp V8	
Plymouth Explorer	1954	Coupé		
Plymouth Plainsman	1957	Station wagon		
Plymouth Cabana	1958	Station wagon		Unique glass roof for the rear portion of the car.
Plymouth XNR	1960	2-seater convertible	2.8L 250 hp Straight-six engine	
Plymouth Asimmetrica	1961	2-seater convertible	3.7L 145 hp Straight-six engine	
Plymouth Valiant St. Regis	1962	Coupé		
Plymouth V.I.P.	1965	4-seater convertible		Unique roof bar from the top of the windshield to the rear deck.
Plymouth Barracuda Formula SX	1966	Coupé		
Plymouth Duster I Road Runner	1969	Coupé	340 hp V8; 426 hp V8	All features of the Road Runner plus flaps on top and sides and adjustable spoilers on the side of the rear fender, all to reduce lift.
Plymouth Rapid Transit System 'Cuda (440)	1970	Convertible		
Plymouth Rapid Transit System Road Runner	1970	Coupé		Three-colored tail lights: red for "braking", yellow for "coasting" and green for "on the gas".
Plymouth Rapid Transit System Duster 340	1970	Coupé	5.6L c.300 hp V8	
Plymouth Concept Voyager II	1986	Minivan		
Plymouth Slingshot	1988	2-seater coupé	2.2L 225 hp turbocharged Straight-four engine	Canopy that swings upwards to open the car Adjustable four-wheel independent suspension Keyless credit card-like entry Combined headlight and rear-view mirror pods Exposed engine and suspension
Plymouth Speedster	1989	2-seater convertible		No opening doors, to make getting in more fun
Plymouth Voyager 3	1989	Minivan		The front of the car could be driven by itself or driven when attached to a "miniature tractor-trailer" Glass roof
Plymouth X2S	1989	Coupé; Convertible	2.0L (turbocharged) 167 hp V6	
Plymouth Breeze	c.1990	Sedan	2.0L 132 hp 4 cylinder engine 2.4L 150 hp Straight-four engine	
Plymouth Prowler	1993	Convertible	3.5L 214 hp V6	
Plymouth Expresso	1994	Compact car		
Plymouth Backpack	1995	2-seater		Space for a laptop on a small table Built-in bike rack on the back
Plymouth Pronto	1997	Convertible		The front of the car resembled that of the Prowler; Roll-back fabric top
Plymouth Pronto Spyder	1998	Convertible	2.4L 225 hp Straight-four engine	
Plymouth Howler	1999	Convertible	3.5L c.250 hp V6; 4.7L c.250 hp V8	
Plymouth Voyager XG	1999	Minivan	2.5L 115 hp turbocharged diesel engine	Powered retractable sunroof
