= Bill Robinson (auto designer) =

American automobile designer (1925–2022)

- Born: William Robinson; August 31, 1925; Detroit, Michigan, U.S.
- Died: February 15, 2022 (aged 96); Pontiac, Michigan, U.S.
- Occupations: Automotive designer Chrysler

William Robinson (August 31, 1925 – February 15, 2022) was an American automobile designer for numerous American companies, notably Chrysler as creative designer from 1948 to 1980 and Briggs Manufacturing Company. In a second career, Robinson taught design for twenty-two years at the College of Creative Studies.

== Early life ==
As a young boy, Robinson was a neighbor of Vincent Kaptor known as Harley Earl’s right-hand man. Kaptor would frequently bring plaster-cast models home of early General Motors designs. On occasion, Kaptor would drive new models home. It was one of these times that Robinson stopped the neighborhood street baseball game to study a new Cord (automobile). These experiences inspired Robinson to design cars. Robinson was also inspired by the “sharknose” Graham-Paige and many of his designs after that were influenced by that automobile.

At the age of 13, Robinson built a Soap Box Derby racer that incorporated adjustable suspension and a windshield into the body design. The judges awarded Robinson best-design over the hundreds of other racers. “There's nothing I’ve done more in my life that's taught me more than building that racer.”

Bill Robinson was a graduate of Detroit’s Cass Technical High School. In 1945, Bill as a youngster designed a prepossessed vehicle for the future, which was a rocket ship type of vehicle designed for the space age. Robinson learned in 1945 that automobile designers were earning $100,000/year. That and his love for designing cars encouraged him to become an automotive designer.

== Design work ==
=== Kaiser-Frazer ===
Robinson’s first job was an advertising and brochure illustrator, later moving on to Kaiser-Frazer where he had designed proposals for many early stages for 1950s Packards.

=== Briggs Manufacturing Company ===
Robinson moved on to the Briggs Manufacturing Company where he designed details for forthcoming Packard models.

=== Chrysler ===
One of Robinson's notable designs at Chrysler was the Plymouth Belmont. Although the design was originally credited to Virgil "Ex" Exner, Exner admitted in his biography that Bill Robinson was the designer of the 1954 Belmont.

During his career at Chrysler, Bill had a significant role in the development and designs of all new 1957 Plymouth models—most notably the Plymouth Fury. Robinson commented that the 1957 Plymouth redesign was a last-minute decision by Chrysler. That was good news to a designer, he added, in that the company had to accept the designer's idea with so little time to make changes. Bill’s design was so successful that the Plymouth Division went on to sell 750,000 cars for 1957. Motor Trend named Plymouth the best handling car in the country—eventually awarding the 1957 Motor Trend Car of The Year Award to Chrysler Corporation’s five divisions based on “Superior Handling and Roadability Qualities.”

The last car Robinson worked on was the Plymouth Horizon and Dodge Omni. Aerodynamics were just coming into design work at that time and he was asked to attend over 200 aerodynamic tests at a wind tunnel in Maryland. Results were recorded with a Polaroid Instant camera but the results were not very good. Robinson would make sketches of the tests and point out anything that needed to be studied.

== College for Creative Studies ==
After retiring from Chrysler in 1980, Robinson started teaching transportation and industrial design classes at Detroit's College for Creative Studies (CCS) for twenty two years. In a recent presentation at the Men of the Kirk in the Hills, Robinson said he told his students the three most important features of design are proportion, proportion, and proportion. He added that less is more. His students would reply tongue-in-cheek, "Less is boring". He felt it would take students four or five years to realize the importance of simplicity.

In 2000, he received the first Honored Design Educator award presented by EyesOn Design a prominent annual car show benefiting the Detroit Institute of Ophthalmology (DIO).

== Personal life and death ==
Robinson was a resident of West Bloomfield Township, Michigan. A significant aspect of his life was his religious faith. Robinson taught Sunday School classes from 1943. In recognition of his decades of service, the Kirk in the Hills Presbyterian Church (USA) in Bloomfield Township, Oakland County, Michigan named its "William (Bill) Robinson Pastoral Residency" program in his honor.

In 2005, Robinson donated many of his original Chrysler designs to the Walter P. Chrysler Museum and several original Packard drawings from the 1950s to the Packard Proving Grounds.

He died in Pontiac, Michigan, on February 15, 2022, at the age of 96. In an Autoweek article announcing Robinson's death, Rivian designer Richard Vaughan calls Robinson "the most influential American car designer of the post-war era."

In honor of Robinson's legacy, the Kirk in the Hills sponsors the Bill Robinson Car Show each year in June. The Center for Creative Studies Alumni schedules a 'coffee & cars' gathering of school alumni during the event.
