= Plymouth Duster (disambiguation) =

The Plymouth Duster is a two-door coupé sold from 1969 to 1976.

Plymouth Duster may also refer to:

- An optional trim package for the Plymouth Volaré (1979–1980)
- An optional trim package for the Plymouth Turismo (1985–1987)
- An optional trim package for the Plymouth Sundance (1992–1994)
