= Plymouth (disambiguation) =

Plymouth is a city in Devon, England.

Plymouth may also refer to:

- Plymouth Colony, founded in North America by English Puritan separatists in 1620
- Plymouth, Massachusetts, known as "America's Hometown," the town now on the site of Plymouth Colony
- Plymouth (automobile), an American automobile brand of Chrysler
  - Plymouth cars, see List of Plymouth vehicles

== Places ==
=== Canada ===
- Plymouth, Pictou County, Nova Scotia
- Plymouth, Yarmouth County, Nova Scotia

=== Trinidad and Tobago ===
- Plymouth, Trinidad and Tobago

=== United Kingdom ===
- Plymouth (constituency), a former constituency
- Plymouth, Merthyr Tydfil, an electoral ward in Wales
- Plymouth (Penarth electoral ward), in Penarth, Wales
- Plymouth, Montserrat, abandoned city in the British Overseas Territory of Montserrat
- Greater Plymouth, a unitary authority due to be formed in 2028

=== United States ===
- Plymouth, California
- Plymouth Colony, founded in North America by the Pilgrim Fathers in 1620
- Plymouth, Connecticut
- Plymouth, Florida
- Plymouth, Illinois
- Plymouth, Indiana
- Plymouth County, Iowa
- Plymouth, Iowa
- Plymouth, Kansas
- Plymouth, Maine
- Plymouth, Massachusetts, known as "America's Hometown", the New England town now on the site of Plymouth Colony
  - Plymouth Center, Massachusetts, the main village within the town of Plymouth
  - Plymouth Rock, United States historic place within the town of Plymouth
- Plymouth County, Massachusetts
- Plymouth, Michigan
- Plymouth, Minnesota
- Plymouth, Mississippi
- Plymouth, Missouri
- Plymouth, Nebraska
- Plymouth, New Hampshire, a New England town
  - Plymouth (CDP), New Hampshire, the main village in the town
- Plymouth, New York
- Plymouth, North Carolina
- Plymouth, Ohio
- Plymouth, Pennsylvania
- Plymouth Township, Montgomery County, Pennsylvania
  - Plymouth Meeting
- Plymouth, Utah
- Plymouth, Vermont
- Plymouth, West Virginia
- Plymouth, Juneau County, Wisconsin, a town
- Plymouth, Rock County, Wisconsin, a town
- Plymouth, Sheboygan County, Wisconsin, a town
  - Plymouth, Wisconsin, a city in Sheboygan County, located within the town of Plymouth
- Plymouth Township (disambiguation)

== Business and organisations ==
- Plymouth Albion R.F.C., English rugby union club based in Plymouth
- Plymouth Argyle F.C., English football club based in Plymouth
- Plymouth Company, an English joint-stock company founded by King James I in 1606 to establish coastal settlements on North America
- Plymouth State University, Plymouth, New Hampshire, part of the University of New Hampshire
- Plymouth University, Devon

== Transport ==
- Plymouth (automobile), an American automobile brand of Chrysler
  - Plymouth cars, see List of Plymouth vehicles
- Plymouth Locomotive Works
- Plymouth City Airport, a former airport in Plymouth, England
- HMS Plymouth, any of nine ships bearing this name
- USS Plymouth, any of four ships bearing this name
- Plymouth (MBTA station) in Plymouth, Massachusetts

== Other uses ==
- Plymouth Gin, a brand of gin produced in Plymouth
- Plymouth (software), a graphical boot splash for Linux
- The Plymouth, building listed on the National Register of Historic Places in Washington, D. C.
- Plymouth (film), 1991 pilot for a television series about a mining town on the Moon

== See also ==
- New Plymouth (disambiguation)
