= Battle of Plymouth =

Battle of Plymouth may refer to:

- Battle of Plymouth (1652), a naval battle off of Plymouth, England, during the First Anglo-Dutch War
- Battle of Plymouth (1864), a battle at Plymouth, North Carolina, during the American Civil War

== See also ==
- Plymouth (disambiguation)
