= GLHS =

GLHS may refer to:

- Shelby GLHS, an automobile
- Greater Lafayette Health Services, now Franciscan Health, in Lafayette, Indiana, United States

== Schools ==
- Gordon Lee High School, Chickamauga, Georgia, United States
- Governor Livingston High School, Berkeley Heights, New Jersey, United States
- Grass Lake High School, Grass Lake, Michigan, United States
- Green Level High School, Cary, North Carolina, United States
- Gahanna Lincoln High School, Gahanna, Ohio, United States
