= Shelby GLH-S =

Shelby GLHS
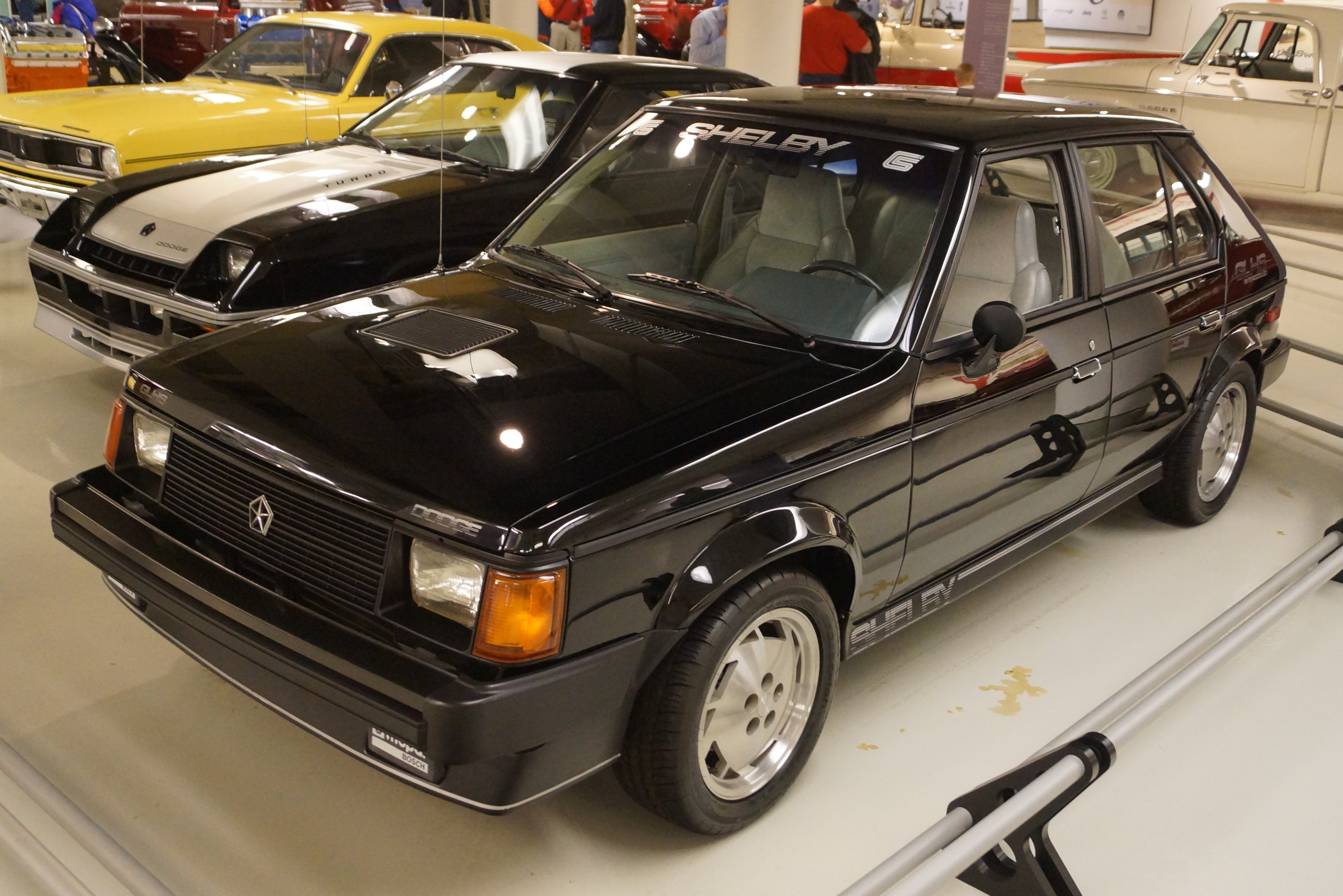
- 1986 Shelby GLH-S on display at the Walter P. Chrysler Museum

Overview
- Manufacturer: Chrysler Corporation; Shelby American
- Production: 1986–1987
- Assembly: United States: Belvidere, Illinois (Belvidere Assembly)

Body and chassis
- Class: Hot hatch Sport compact
- Body style: 3-door hatchback (1987); 5-door hatchback (1986)
- Layout: Transverse front-engine, front-wheel drive
- Platform: L-body
- Related: Dodge Charger; Dodge Omni; Talbot Horizon; Plymouth Turismo

Powertrain
- Engine: 2.2 L Turbo I I4
- Transmission: 5-speed A525 manual

The Shelby GLH-S is a limited production series of sport compacts from the mid-1980s based on the Dodge Omni and modified by Shelby American. Later the name would also be applied to a Shelby modified version of the Dodge Shelby Charger. The GLH-S models all used intercooled turbocharged 4-cylinder engines.

== 1986 ==
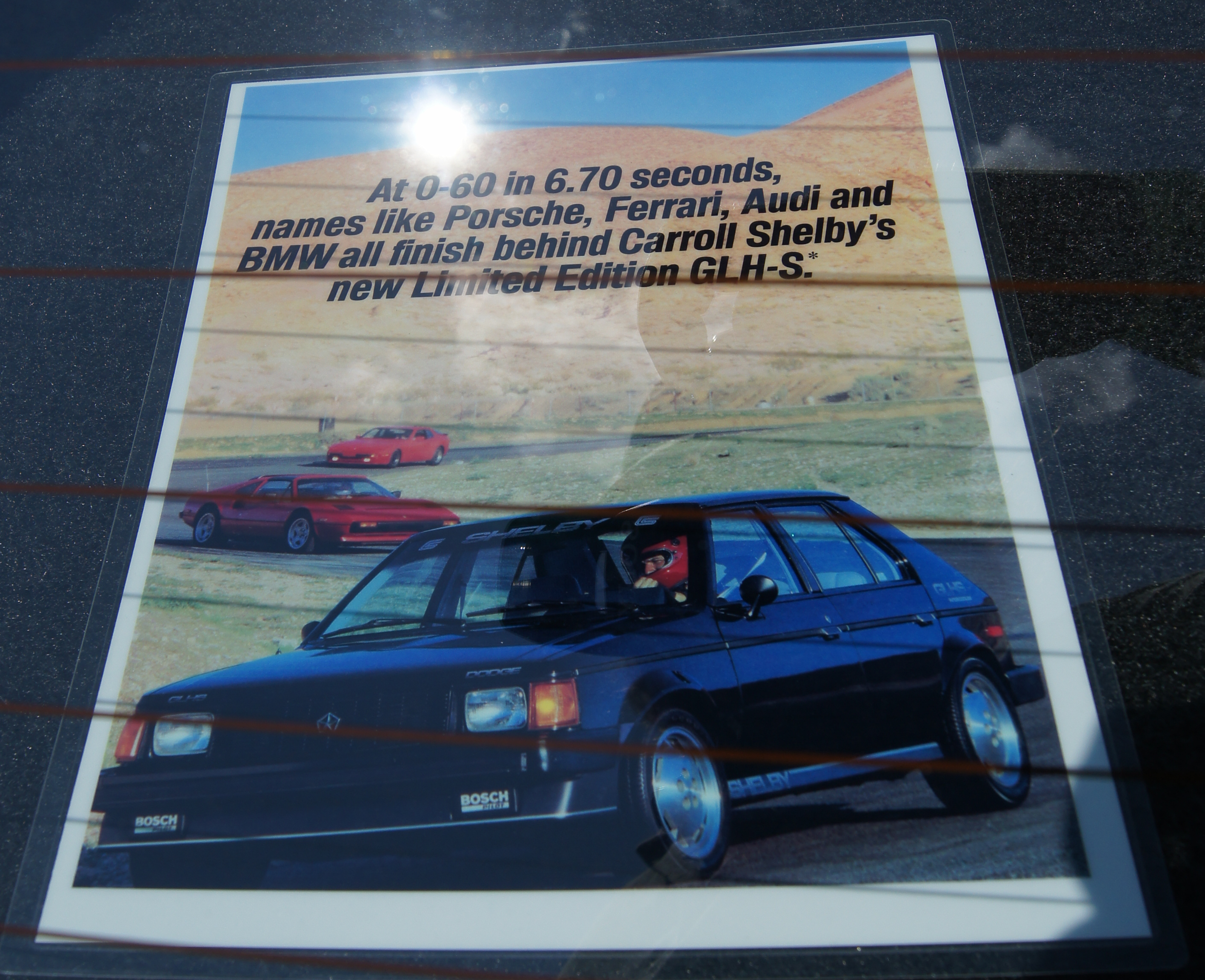
Shelby Omni GLH-S advertisement, 1986

The 1986 Shelby Omni GLH-S was a modified Dodge Omni GLH, with changes made at the Shelby factory. They were retitled as Shelby Automobiles cars sold at select Dodge dealerships. GLH stood for "Goes Like Hell" and GLH-S stood for Goes Like Hell S'more. 500 units were produced.

The Turbo I engine was modified with pre-production pieces from what would become the Turbo II inline-four engine. These changes included an intercooler, plus other changes to produce 175 hp (130 kW) at 5300 rpm and a flat 175 ft·lbf (237 N·m) torque curve. Not included were any of the durability changes to the short block (forged crank, full floating pin, stouter connecting rods, etc.) of the 1987 Chrysler Turbo II engine. The GLH-S had a 0–60 mph (97 km/h) acceleration time of 6.5 seconds and a 14.8 second quarter mile (402 m) time. Top speed was 135 mph (217 km/h).

== 1987 ==
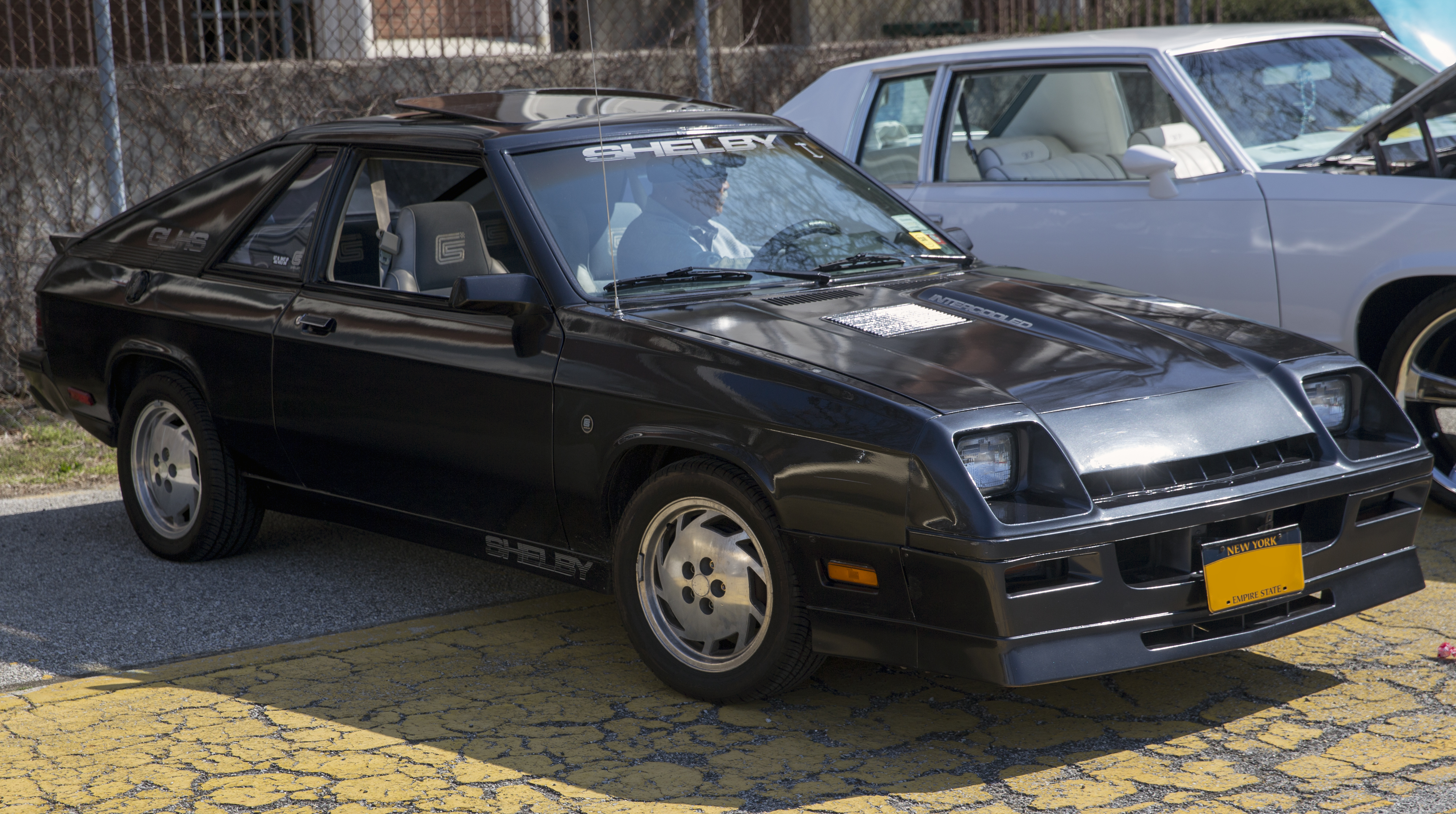
1987 Shelby GLH-S

The 1987 Charger GLH-S was based on the 1987 Shelby Charger. Shelby Automobiles purchased the last 1,000 Chargers built and they were shipped to the Whittier factory for modification. Shelby modified the Charger using the same pieces as the 1986 GLH-S, with some changes. The differences include a non-EGR turbo, Shelby valve cover, wider Shelby windshield decal (no CS logos), different and more extensive tape graphics package, no reference to Dodge on the outer body, black/white speedo overlay, a four-digit serial numbering system on the dash plaque, wider Mobil 1 plaque installed on the radiator support, and Shelby Centurion II wheels.

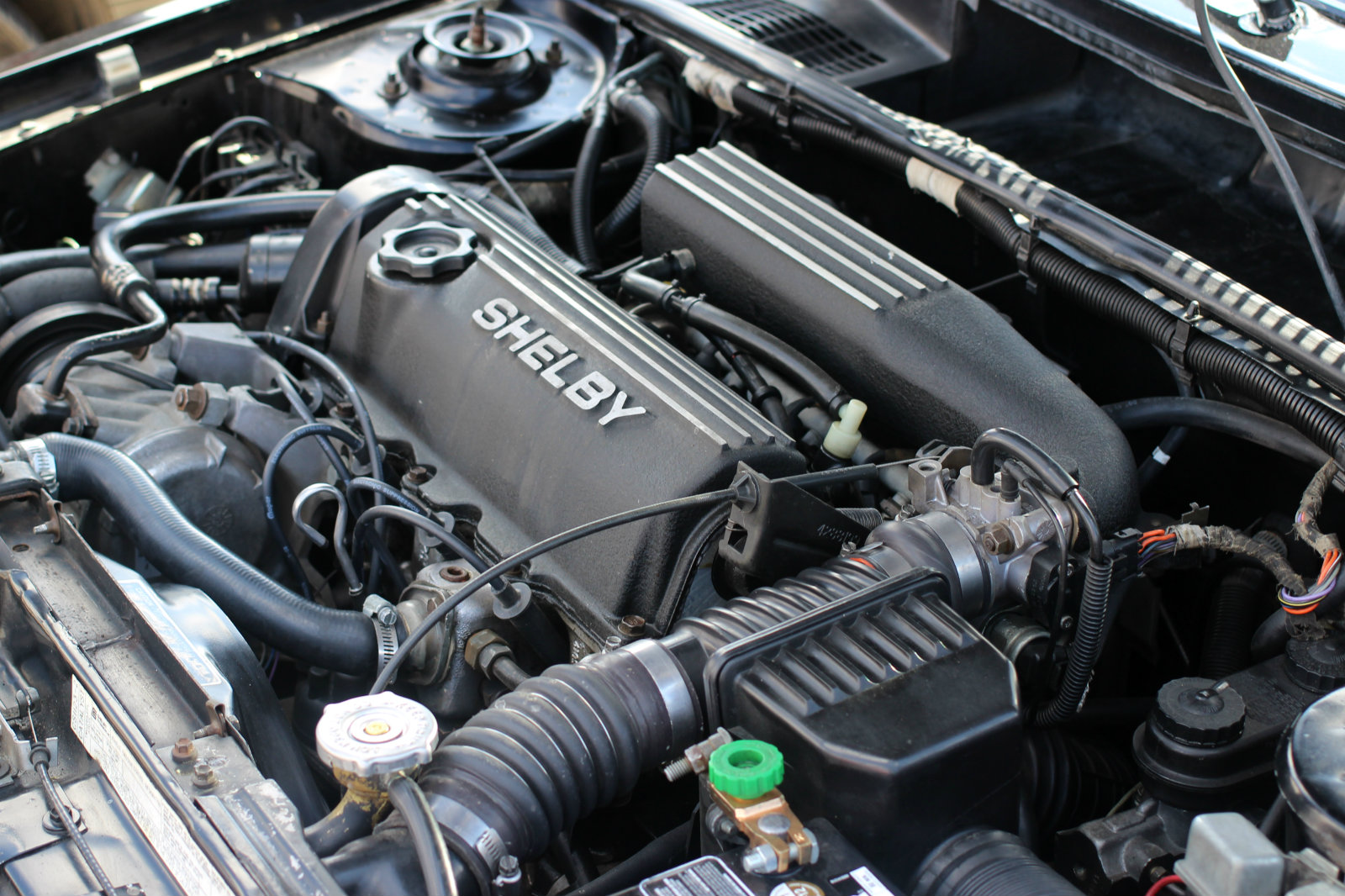
The turbocharged 2.2-liter engine of a 1987 GLH-S
