= New Plymouth (disambiguation) =

New Plymouth is a city in New Zealand.

New Plymouth may also refer to:

- New Plymouth (New Zealand electorate), for the city
- New Plymouth, Idaho, in the United States
- New Plymouth, Ohio, in the United States
- New Plymouth, Livingston Island, Antarctica
- Plymouth Colony, in New England, the United States
- New Plymouth is a settlement on Green Turtle Cay in the Bahamas founded in the 1700s. Population is around 450.

== See also ==
- Plymouth (disambiguation)
