= Chrysler Horizon =

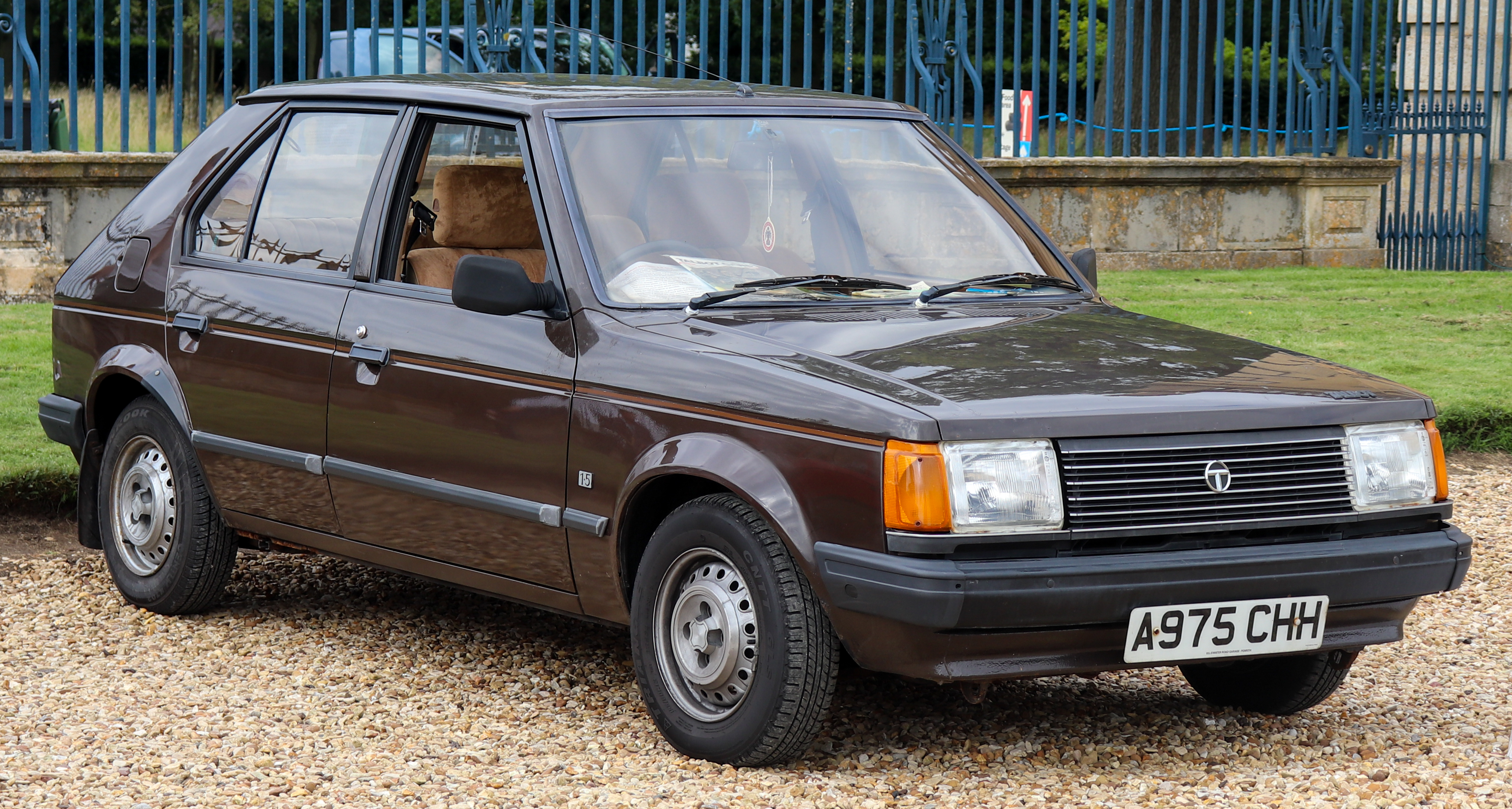
- 1983 Talbot Horizon

Overview
- Manufacturer: Chrysler Europe (1978–1979); PSA Peugeot Citroën (1979–1987)
- Also called: Chrysler Horizon (UK: 1978–1979); Chrysler Simca Horizon; Talbot Horizon (Europe: 1979–1986)
- Production: 1978–1987
- Assembly: France: Poissy (Peugeot); Finland: Uusikaupunki (Saab-Valmet); Spain: Madrid; United Kingdom: Ryton (Ryton plant)
- Designer: Peter Horbury, Roy Axe

Body and chassis
- Class: Small family car (C)
- Body style: 5-door hatchback
- Layout: FF layout
- Platform: L-body
- Related: Plymouth Horizon

Powertrain
- Engine: petrol: 1118 cc Poissy I4; 1294 cc Poissy I4; 1442 cc Poissy I4; diesel: 1905 cc XUD9 I4

Chronology
- Predecessor: Simca 1100; Hillman Avenger
- Successor: Peugeot 309

The Chrysler Horizon (also Talbot Horizon) is a small family car (C-segment) that was sold from the 1978 to 1987 model years. Designed by Chrysler Europe as the replacement for the Simca 1100 and Hillman Avenger, the Horizon was initially marketed under the Simca and Chrysler brands. Following the sale of Chrysler Europe to Peugeot, the model line was marketed as a Talbot for the rest of its production. Competing against the Volkswagen Golf and the later Ford Escort, the Horizon was sold exclusively as a 5-door hatchback through its production.

Voted European Car of the Year in 1979, the Horizon was the first world car developed by Chrysler, designed in tandem with the American-market Dodge Omni/Plymouth Horizon (which had no predecessor). Though the Chrysler L platform was used for all three vehicles (and Plymouth sharing the nameplate of its European counterpart) and is visually similar, the two model lines have multiple substantial differences.

The Chrysler/Talbot Horizon was manufactured in four countries. At its launch, it was assembled in Chrysler Europe's Poissy facility (Poissy, France), with British production starting in 1979 at its Ryton facility (Ryton-on-Dunsmore, England). Additional production was licensed from Peugeot in Spain and Saab-Valmet in Finland. Over nine years of production, Chrysler Europe/Peugeot produced 1,070,222 Horizon hatchbacks (in comparison to the 1,639,799 Horizon and Omni hatchbacks produced in the United States).

In 1987, the final Horizon was made in Finland by Saab-Valmet; it would be the final Talbot-badged passenger car as parent company Peugeot replaced it with its own Peugeot 309 (which began development as a Talbot). Currently, Peugeot, Chrysler, Simca, and Talbot are all brands (the latter two, dormantly) owned by Stellantis.

== Origins ==
The Horizon was developed by Chrysler Europe under the codename C2 in the United Kingdom at the Whitley design studio. Designed by Roy Axe, it was engineered in Poissy, France, by Simca as a replacement for their ageing 1100 range, as well as the Hillman Avenger. Introduced to market in summer 1978, it was initially marketed in France under the Simca brand, while elsewhere in Europe it was initially badged as a Chrysler. As a result of the acquisition of Chrysler's European car division by Peugeot in 1978, both the Chrysler and Simca brands were dropped and the car was subsequently marketed under the Talbot brand in all its European markets.

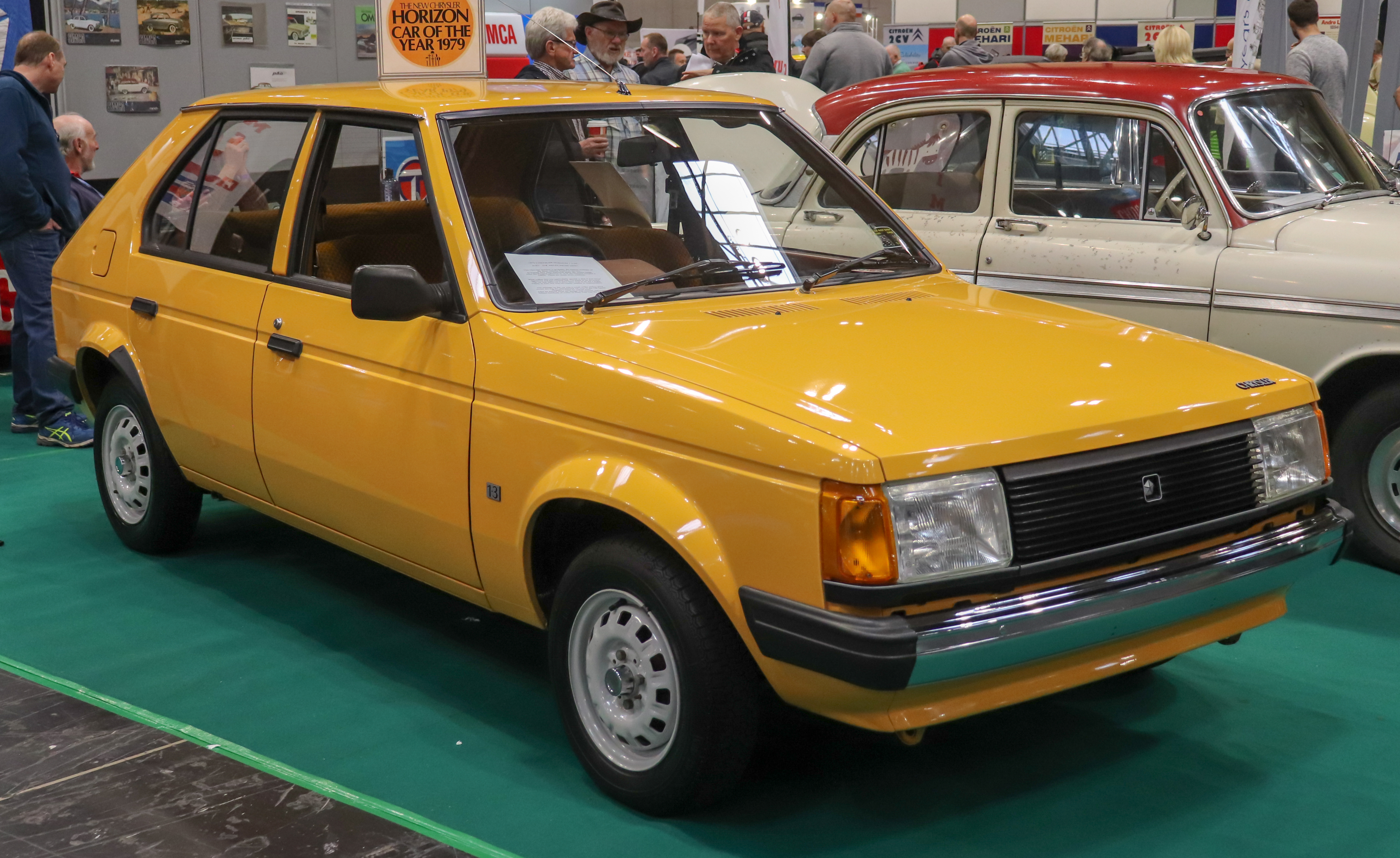
Chrysler Horizon

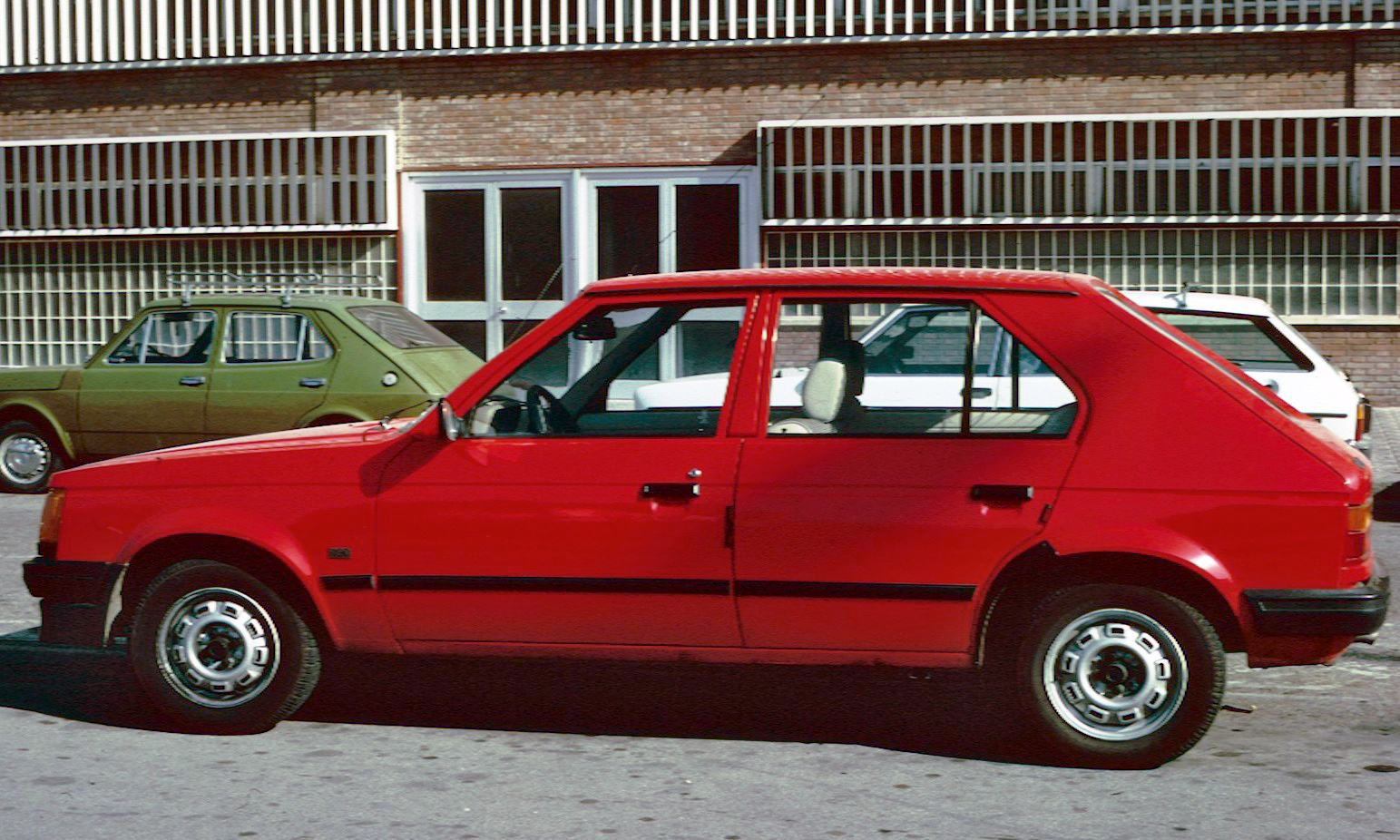
Talbot Horizon in profile

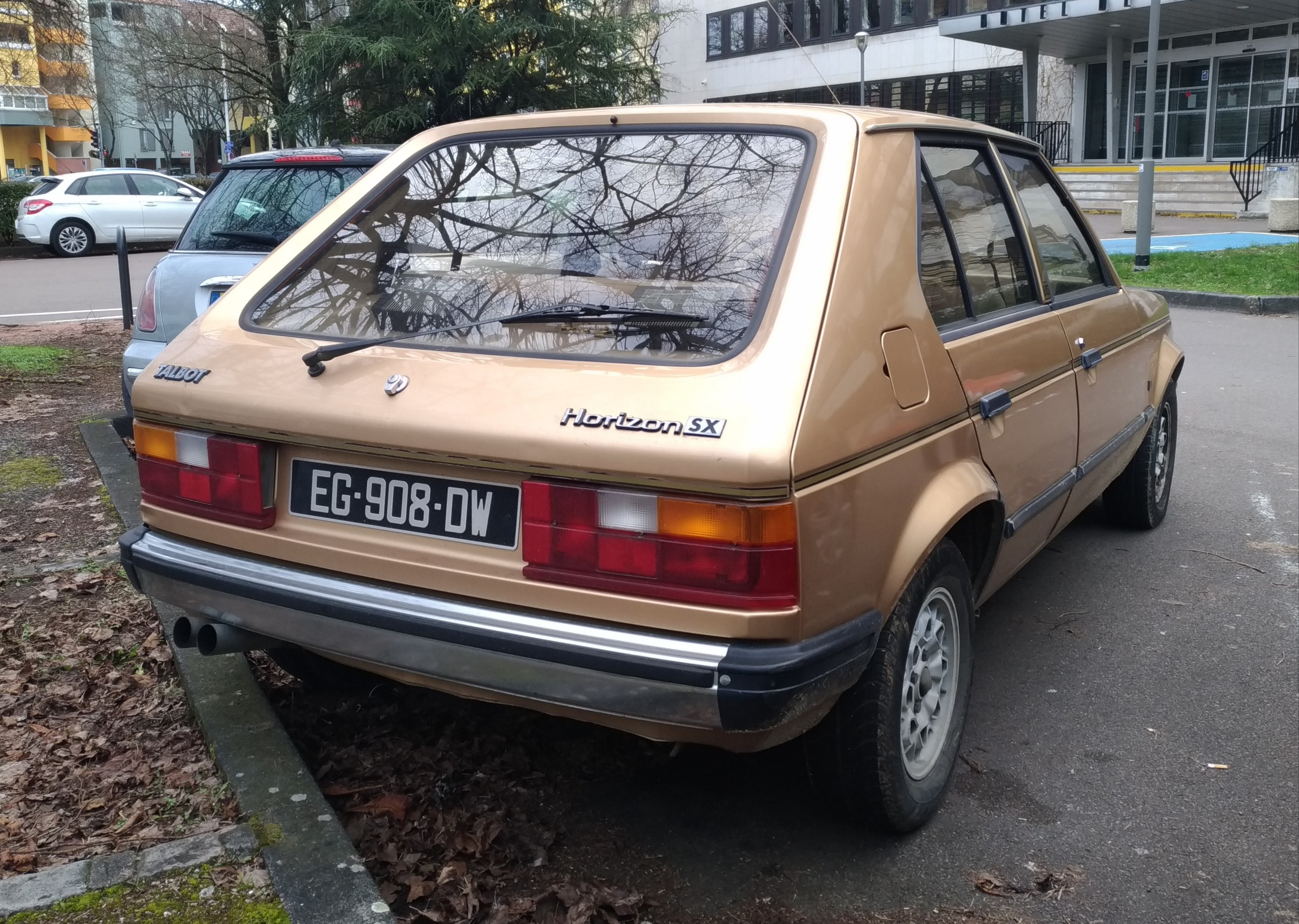
Rear view of a Talbot Horizon

The Horizon was intended to be a "world car" designed for consumers on both sides of the Atlantic, but in execution, the European and North American versions of the vehicle differed substantially. Born largely out of the need to replace the ageing Simca 1100 and Hillman Avenger, the Horizon was essentially a shortened version of the larger Alpine model, giving the vehicle an unusually wide track for its length. Featuring transversely mounted Simca-designed 1.1, 1.3 and 1.5-litre "Poissy" OHV engines, 4-speed gearboxes, and torsion-bar suspension, the Horizon was praised for its crisp styling, supple ride, and competent handling.

The SX version that joined the range for the Paris Motor Show in October 1978 attracted interest for its innovative trip computer. The device took information from three sources, a clock, a "débitmètre" mounted on the fuel feed to the carburetor, and distance information from the feed for the odometer. Using these three pieces of information the "computer" was able to report current fuel consumption and average speeds as well as information on distances and times, in either metric or imperial units. The trip computer later became an option on lesser models such as the GLS.

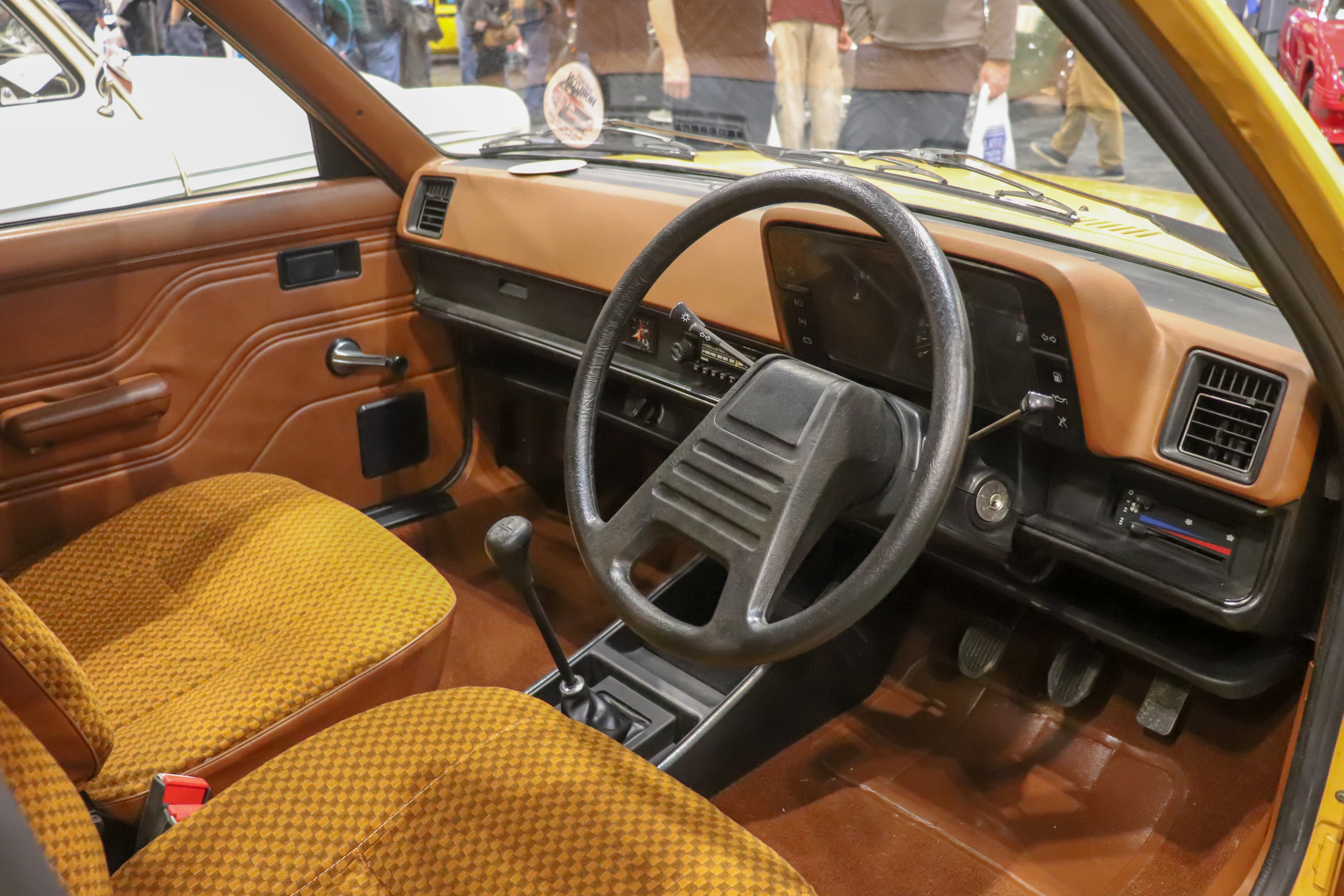
Interior (1978 Chrysler Horizon GL)

The Horizon was voted European Car of the Year in 1979. Initially only available in LS or GL trim, its launch saw the end of the rear-engined Simca 1000. The Simca 1100 remained in production in France until 1981, being sold for a time as a low cost alternative to the Horizon, but the two cars competed in virtually the same segment and the older car, its model range drastically reduced, saw its sales plummet. On the British market, the rear-wheel drive Avenger saloons and estates remained in production alongside it, giving British buyers a full choice of bodystyles in a market where hatchbacks still only accounted for a minority of sales. There was never a three-door version of the Horizon. To fill this niche, the Simca 1100 remained on sale in continental Europe, while the rear-wheel drive Chrysler Sunbeam was sold alongside the Horizon in the United Kingdom until 1981.

In the end, the Horizon overlapped rather than replaced the British-designed rear-drive Sunbeam and Hillman Avenger models, which had been on sale since 1970, their production ending in 1981.

== Model history ==
=== 1978–1982 (Series I) ===
After Chrysler Europe collapsed in 1978 and was sold to Peugeot, the Horizon was rebadged as a Talbot in 1979.

In 1981, the revisited models were introduced with minor improvements. By then however, the Horizon was becoming increasingly uncompetitive next to rivals such as the Volkswagen Golf (which was actually four years older), Opel Kadett/Vauxhall Astra and third generation Ford Escort. The unrefined overhead-valve engines carried over from the Simca 1100 were largely to blame, while body corrosion was a serious issue – at least until the Series II – giving many cars a short service life.

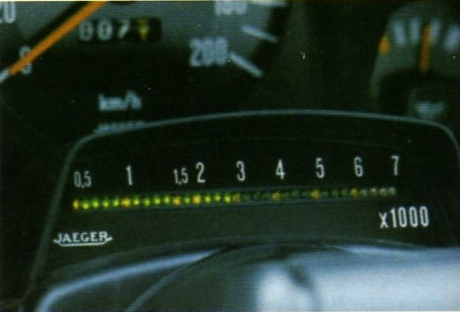
The LED revolution counter of a series 2 Talbot Horizon

=== 1983–1984 (Series II) ===
The series 2 Horizon launched in July 1982 had a 5-speed gearbox, and was badged series II 5 speed. The bumpers were painted black and the backlite was smaller, because the parcel shelf was raised to increase the size of the boot. Some models featured an electronic LED 'econometer' which illuminated several lights around the edge of the speedometer dial. An LED tachometer was available on higher trim levels, the horizontal row of green, yellow, and red LEDs positioned above the steering column, illuminating in 250 rpm intervals.

=== 1985–1987 (Series III) ===
1984 Talbot-Lotus Turbo Horizon at Coventry Transport Museum

The Horizon was updated again in 1985, with revised interior trim, instrument dials and door cards. Along with the Fiat Ritmo/Strada, the Horizon became one of the oldest mainstream family hatchback on sale in Europe, and faced enormous competition. Fewer paint colours and trim levels became available and many examples manufactured between 1985 and 1986, were painted in an unsympathetic pale green or cream — contrasting sharply with the adventurous colors at its introduction.

A Talbot Horizon turbo concept car was produced in 1984 with a full cream leather interior and sporty body kit, the car was designed at Whitley, Coventry. The Turbo Horizon is very different from those models once seen out on the street and is kept at Coventry Transport Museum, Coventry England.

Due to corrosion issues, Horizons remaining in use are rare, with just 20 examples still on the road in the UK at the end of 2016.

== Horizon in the UK ==
In Britain, the Horizon was seen as a modern alternative to the existing Rootes-designed Avenger models, offering buyers a front-wheel drive hatchback alongside the rear-wheel drive saloons and estates. The Avenger was marketed alongside the Horizon until 1981, by which time the company had come under Peugeot ownership and no new models were launched to replace it, as the front-wheel drive hatchback style was becoming more popular and Peugeot already had the similar-sized 305 saloon and estates in production.

UK sales of the Horizon (which went on sale there in early 1978 and was badged as a Chrysler until 1 August 1979, when it became a Talbot) were initially acceptable, held back by the fact that it was a French import. Sales improved as manufacture was brought to the United Kingdom in 1982. Soon thereafter, however, it started to lose sales in a segment dominated by an increasing number of newer models including the Ford Escort Mark III, Vauxhall Astra, and Austin Maestro. Foreign models like the Volkswagen Golf and Datsun Sunny were also proving popular in the early 1980s.

The last British Horizons were marketed in 1986, soon after the launch of Peugeot's Ryton-built 309 which had originally been intended for sale as the Talbot Arizona, as a Talbot-branded successor to the Horizon, and went on sale in January 1986. The 309 continued the Simca heritage by using Simca-derived engines in its smaller models.

The Ryton factory remained open until December 2006.

=== UK Specifications range ===
Capacity	1118–1905 cc
Power	59–90 hp
Max. speed	147 km/h (91 mph) – 175 km/h (109 mph)
Acceleration	0–60 mp/h: 17.9–11.4 seconds

=== Models ===
The UK Horizon was available in the following trim levels:

- 1100 LE, LS, GL, GLE
- 1300 LS, GL, LX, GLS
- 1500 LS, GL, EX, GLS, S, SX
- 1900 LD

Most models were available with 4 or 5-speed gearboxes, which were initially a carry-over of the Simca gearbox, and then later the PSA BE gearbox. An automatic transmission was available on most 1500 models, and was standard equipment on the 1500 SX model. The lowest level LE had very meagre equipment, not even being fitted with a rear parcel shelf.

Some limited editions were:

- 1500 "Pullman" top of range model. This had upmarket trim and a design of alloy wheel similar to the Talbot Sunbeam Lotus and a wider tyre. The Pullman also had radio upgrade with 4 speakers, and rear seatbelts. Most had beige over brown metallic, two-tone paintwork. Around 20% of the Pullman models were two tone silver and blue.
- 1300 "Summertime Special" This had red plastic trim in place of the usual black.
- 1500/1300 "Ultra" (1985) an upmarket high-spec car in silver metallic, had its name 'ULTRA' on the front wings in black lettering. Ultra had grey velour interior with red piping. The Ultra had been sold in the Netherlands since 1983.
- 1500 "Silver Fox" which had two tone paintwork half silver, half blue metallic and fitted with alloy wheels.

== Group B Talbot Horizon ==
In 1982 Talbot and Lotus Cars began work on a Group B rally car meant to succeed the Talbot Sunbeam Lotus. Based on the Talbot Horizon, the car was fitted with a mid-mounted Lotus type 911 engine driving the rear wheels. The project was cancelled after two prototypes had been built. Peugeot subsequently began development of their all-wheel drive 205 T16.

== Assembly ==
The Horizon was manufactured primarily at Poissy in France and PSA Ryton Assembly in England. British manufacture commenced on 4 January 1982, and soon thereafter the Ryton plant was working a full five-day week for the first time in sixteen months. At the time, British Horizons had 60% British parts content. It was also manufactured in Spain in Villaverde by PSA Peugeot Citroën's Spanish subsidiary, and in Finland by Saab-Valmet from 1979 onwards. Finnish-manufactured Talbot Horizons integrated many Saab components, especially in the interior and electrical system. The Saab-Valmet factory also made a series of 2,385 cars that ran on kerosene or turpentine.

The Horizon was manufactured in France and also Britain (where production had begun in the 1980s) until June 1986, and in Spain and Finland until 1987. Its successor was the Peugeot 309, a car developed in the UK and launched towards the end of 1985, originally destined to be sold as the Talbot Arizona. The end of Horizon production early in 1987 also marked the end of the Talbot badge on passenger cars. North American variants continued in production until 1990.

The PSA XUD9 diesel engine of 1905 cc diesel engine was fitted to certain models of the Horizon, which was the first example of this engine available in the UK. All UK-market diesel Horizons were made in Spain. The British Peugeot-Talbot brochure of October 1984 shows the only diesel Horizon being the LD 1.9, the XUD9 engine only available in the Peugeot 305 GRD as well. The Horizon was not the first diesel in the Talbot family of cars with the Chrysler 180 in Spain having been available with diesel power during the 1970s.

The Peugeot 309 used some of the Horizon range of Simca-based engines for most of its production life, until replaced with the more modern Peugeot TU engine in 1992.

== North American variants ==
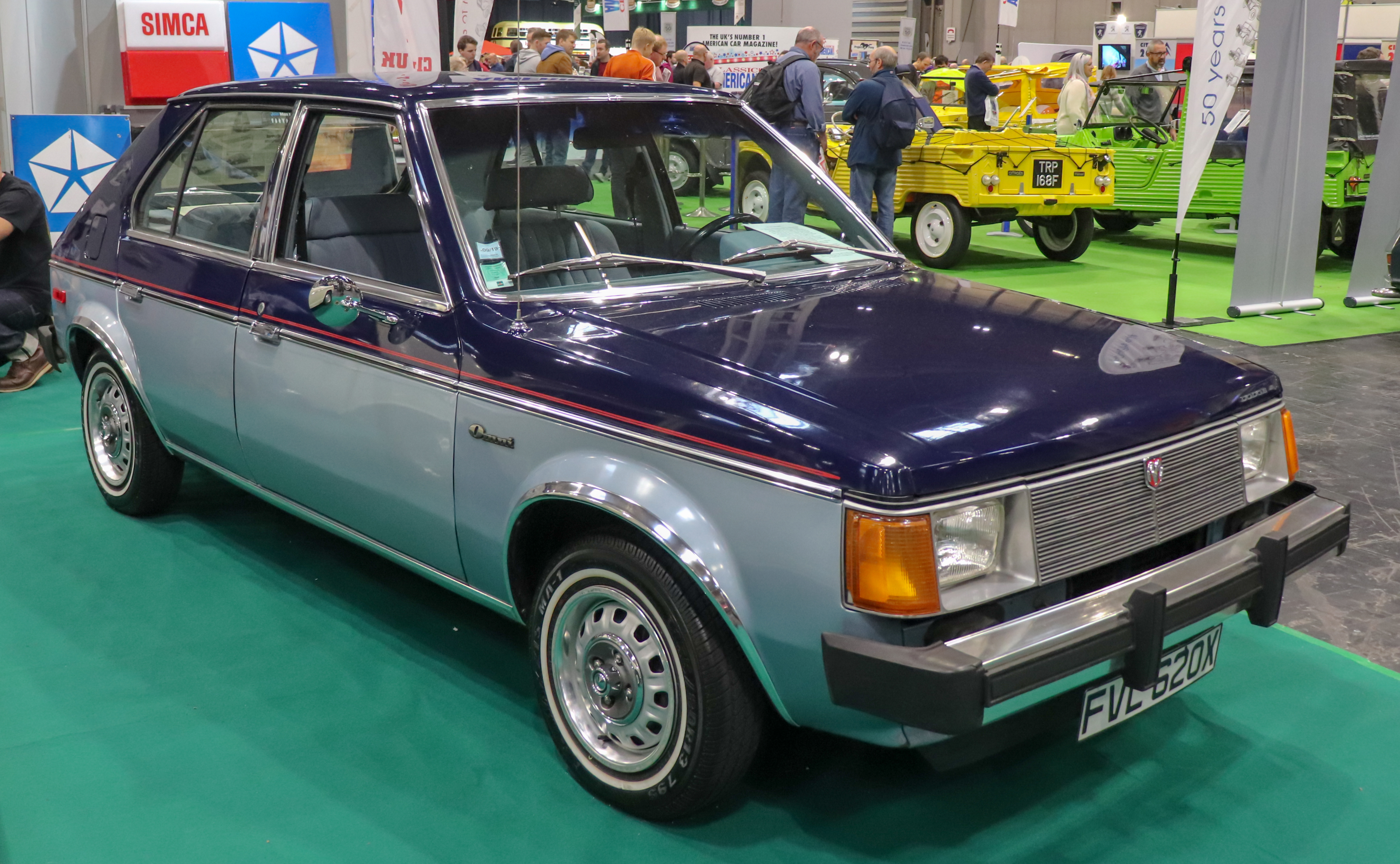
1981 Dodge Omni

1990 Plymouth Horizon

North American derivatives of the Horizon were marketed as the Dodge Omni and Plymouth Horizon. Despite an outwardly similar appearance (with the exception of their headlights), the Dodge and Plymouth versions underwent substantial revisions for American sale. Though sharing a common wheelbase, the Omni/Horizon is nearly 8 inches longer than its Chrysler/Talbot counterpart (primarily resulting from the use of larger 5-mph bumpers).

The bodywork was not interchangeable, as American vehicles were manufactured with a welded joint between the A-pillar base and roof stamping (for better windshield sealing), with the Chrysler Horizon using a single-piece stamping. The Chrysler Horizon is fitted with rear door windows that fully retract (American vehicles have a simpler window regulator design that retracts the window until the final 6 inches of travel). The Omni/Horizon is fitted with front MacPherson struts instead of torsion bars (the original design for the L platform). During its development, the American design was fitted with wide fender flares (to accommodate tire change); this design feature was made part of the Chrysler Horizon bodywork.

The Omni/Horizon have differing powertrains from the Chrysler Horizon as a result of both market demand (for more powerful engines) and a lack of internal supply, leaving Chrysler to source both engines and transmissions from Volkswagen (and later Peugeot); Chrysler added its own engines (as an option) for 1981.

While the Chrysler/Talbot Horizon was exclusively produced as a 5-door hatchback, the American Omni/Horizon served as the basis of multiple other designs (using other nameplates), including three-door hatchback versions (Dodge Omni O24 and Charger and Plymouth Horizon TC-3 / Turismo); economy trim levels (America, Miser); high-performance versions (Omni GLH, GLH Turbo, and Shelby GLHS) — as well as a pickup truck variant (Plymouth Scamp and Dodge Rampage). The American version of the L platform would outlive its European namesake, ending production after the 1990 model year; it was ultimately replaced by the Neon sedan/coupe.
