= Dodge Rampage =

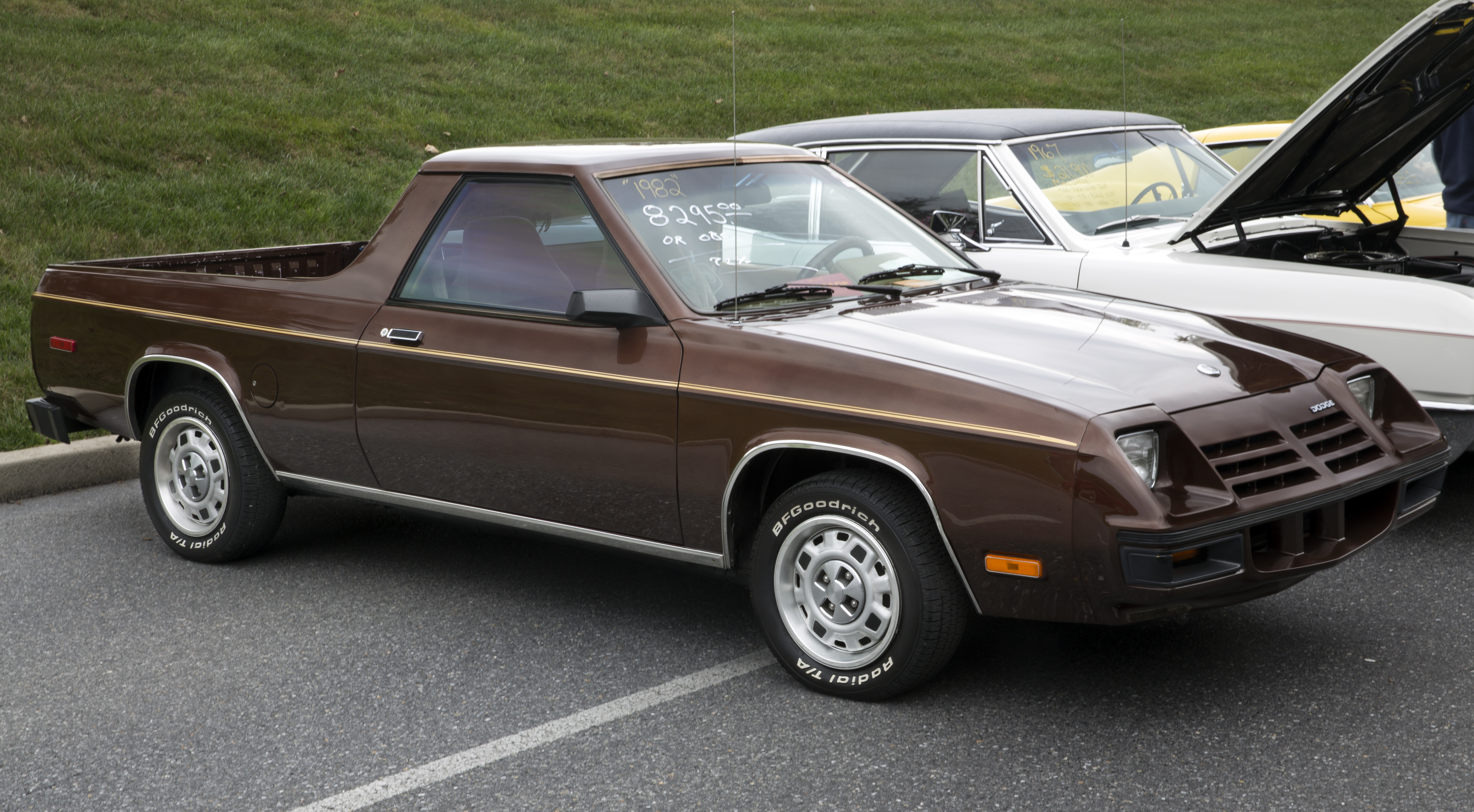
- 1982 Dodge Rampage

Overview
- Manufacturer: Dodge (Chrysler)
- Also called: Plymouth Scamp
- Production: 1982–1984
- Model years: 1982–1984
- Assembly: United States: Belvidere, Illinois (Belvidere Assembly)

Body and chassis
- Class: Coupé utility
- Body style: 2-door truck
- Layout: Transverse front-engine, front-wheel drive
- Platform: L-body
- Related: Dodge Charger; Dodge Omni 024; Plymouth TC3; Plymouth Turismo

Powertrain
- Engine: 2.2 L K I4
- Transmission: 4-speed manual; 5-speed manual; 3-speed TorqueFlite A404 automatic

Dimensions
- Wheelbase: 104.2 in (2,647 mm)
- Length: 183.8 in (4,669 mm)
- Width: 66.8 in (1,696 mm)
- Height: 51.7 in (1,314 mm)
- Curb weight: 2,293 lbs (1,040 kg)

The Dodge Rampage is a subcompact unibody coupe utility based on Chrysler's L platform and manufactured and marketed from 1982 to 1984 model years. Plymouth marketed a rebadged variant for model year 1983, as the Scamp.

The Rampage combined the handling and passenger carrying characteristics of a traditional passenger car with the open-bed versatility and load capacity of a small pickup truck, similar to its competitors: the Volkswagen Rabbit Sportruck and Subaru BRAT.

== Description ==
=== Rampage ===
The Rampage borrowed the car's unibody construction and front end panels and components from the Dodge Omni 024 (later renamed the Charger), using the suspension from its parent vehicles with coil struts and a linkless sway bar at the front, and leaf springs with shock absorbers unique to the Rampage at the rear.

The Rampage was available with a Chrysler-built and designed 2.2 L carbureted inline-four engine with 84 hp (63 kW) to 99 hp (74 kW) depending on the year, a curb weight of around 2,400 lb (1,100 kg) and used a four-speed manual transmission or three-speed automatic transmission. These arrangements gave the vehicle limited performance.

Performance was improved with the introduction of a five-speed manual transmission in 1983. The truck had a load capacity of 1,145 lb (519 kg), for a true "half ton" rating and about 90% that of the Chevrolet El Camino’s rating of 1,250 lb (570 kg).

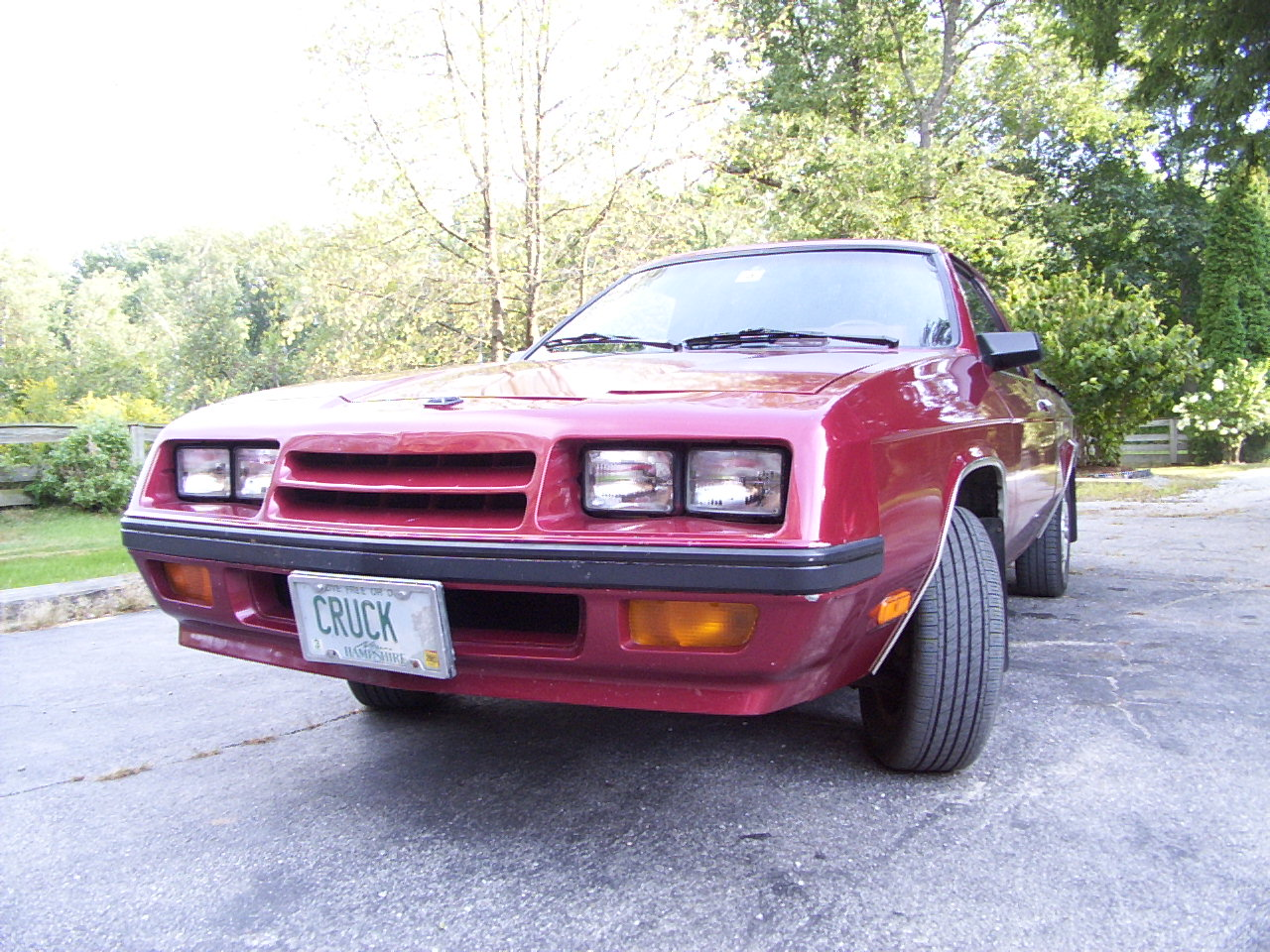
1984 Dodge Rampage, Red

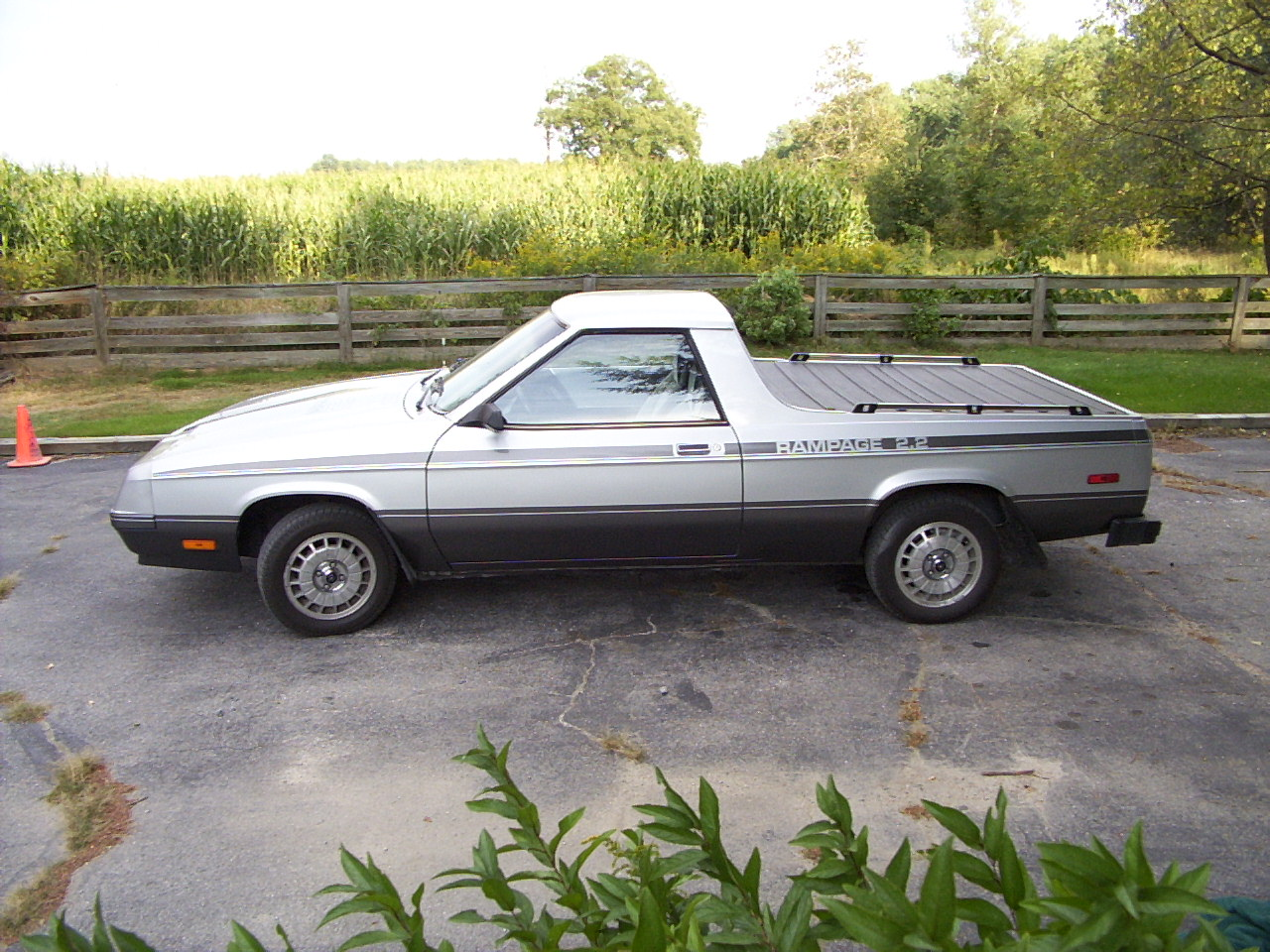
Silver with 2.2 decals

In 1984, the Rampage received a facelifted front fascia shared with the Charger, with quad 165 mm x 100 mm sealed beam headlights opposed to the dual 200 mm x 142 mm sealed beam headlights found on previous models. The grille was also changed, switching from a 6-slot design to a vertically split design. The lower bumper featured revised indicators, a horizontally split lower air intake, and an impact strip that wrapped around the front end.

The Plymouth Scamp was only marketed for 1983. The Rampage lasted three years before being dropped from production after the 1984 model year. There was a "Shelby Rampage" built by Chrysler/Shelby engineers in their free time for Carroll Shelby, but there is no official record of the existence of such a vehicle. However, a special California market "Direct Connection" Rampage was built in 1984 and only sold at certain California-area Dodge dealerships. It featured the front fascia from the Shelby Charger, 15-inch alloy wheels, and a ground effects package. 218 were built according to allpar.com, 1/3 in Black, 1/3 Garnet Red, 1/3 Santa Fe Blue.

The Dodge Rampage produced sales of 17,636 in 1982, 8,033 in 1983, and 11,732 in 1984 — and total sales for the Plymouth Scamp were 2,184 base models and 1,380 for the Scamp GT.

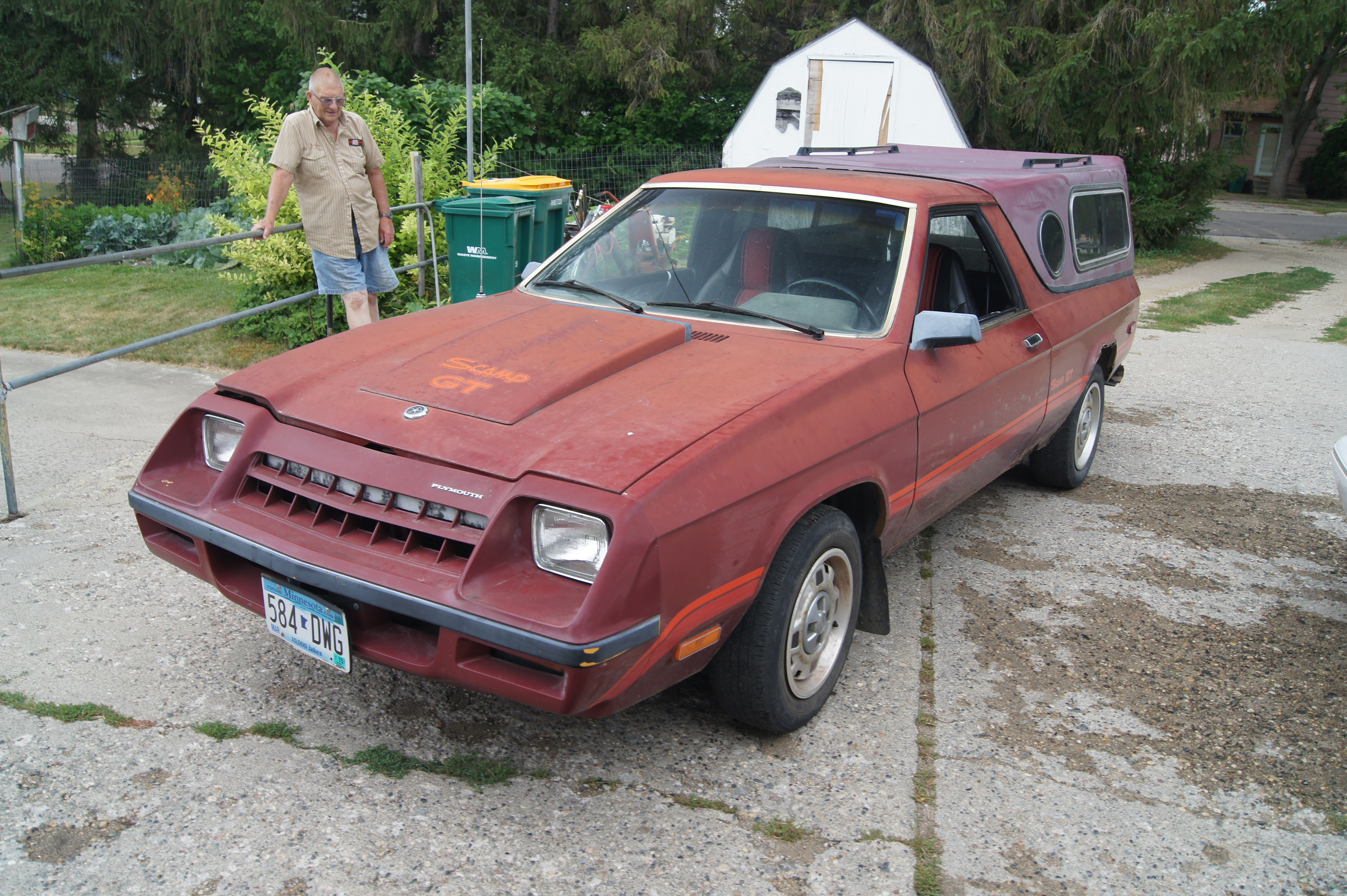
1983 Plymouth Scamp

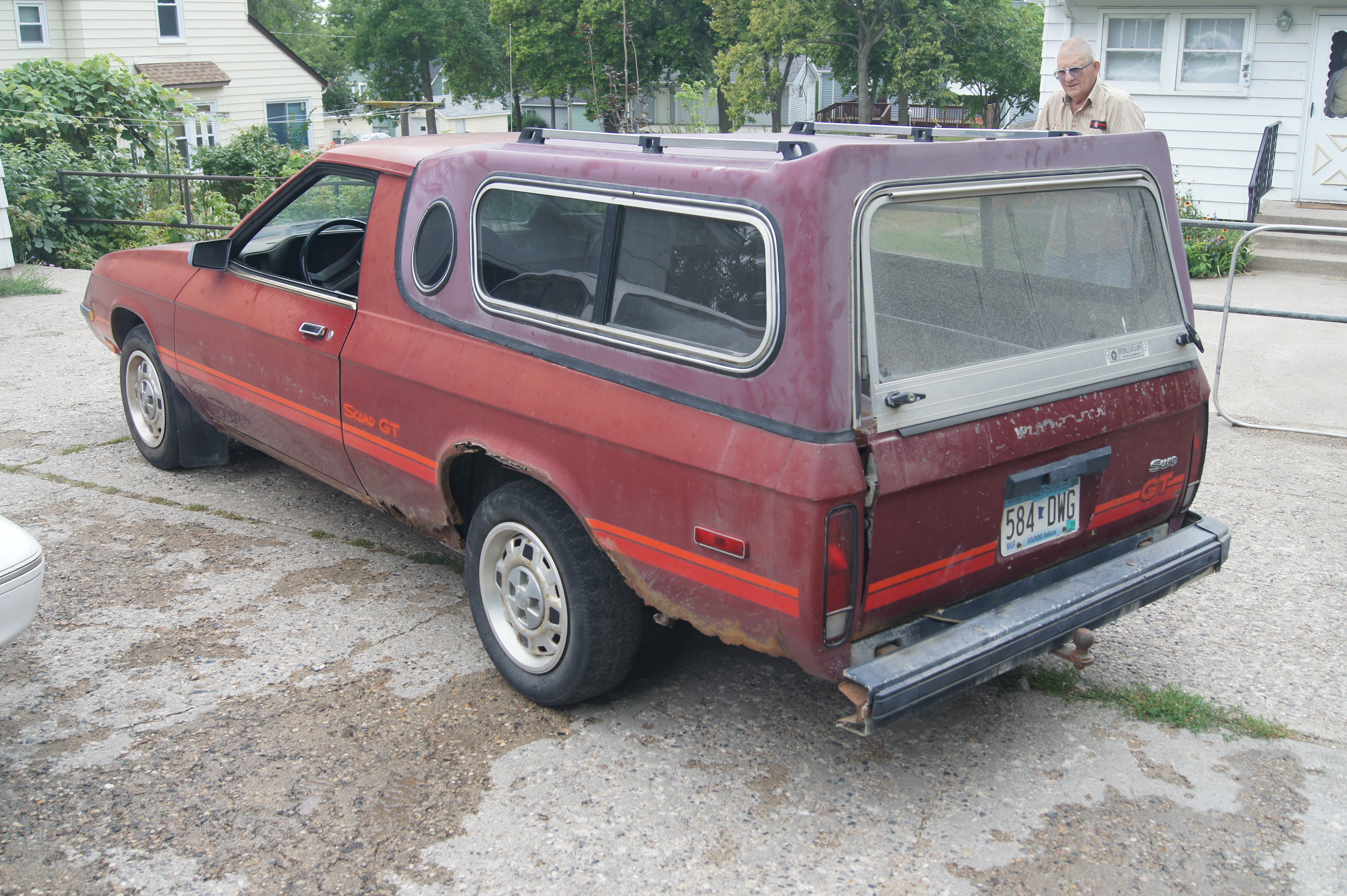
Rear

== 2006 concept ==
Dodge resurrected the Rampage name at the 2006 Chicago Auto Show with a front-wheel drive concept pickup. As opposed to the original Rampage, this concept vehicle was as large as the full-size Dodge Ram. It was powered by the 5.7 L Hemi V8 and featured "Stow 'n Go" seating taken from the Chrysler minivans.
