= Plymouth Scamp =

There have been two small cars from Plymouth called the Scamp:

- 1971–1976 RWD 2-door hardtop coupe, based on the Plymouth Valiant
- 1983 FWD coupé utility, based on the Plymouth Horizon; see Dodge Rampage
