= Dodge Charger (1981) =

Dodge Charger (Chrysler L-body cars)
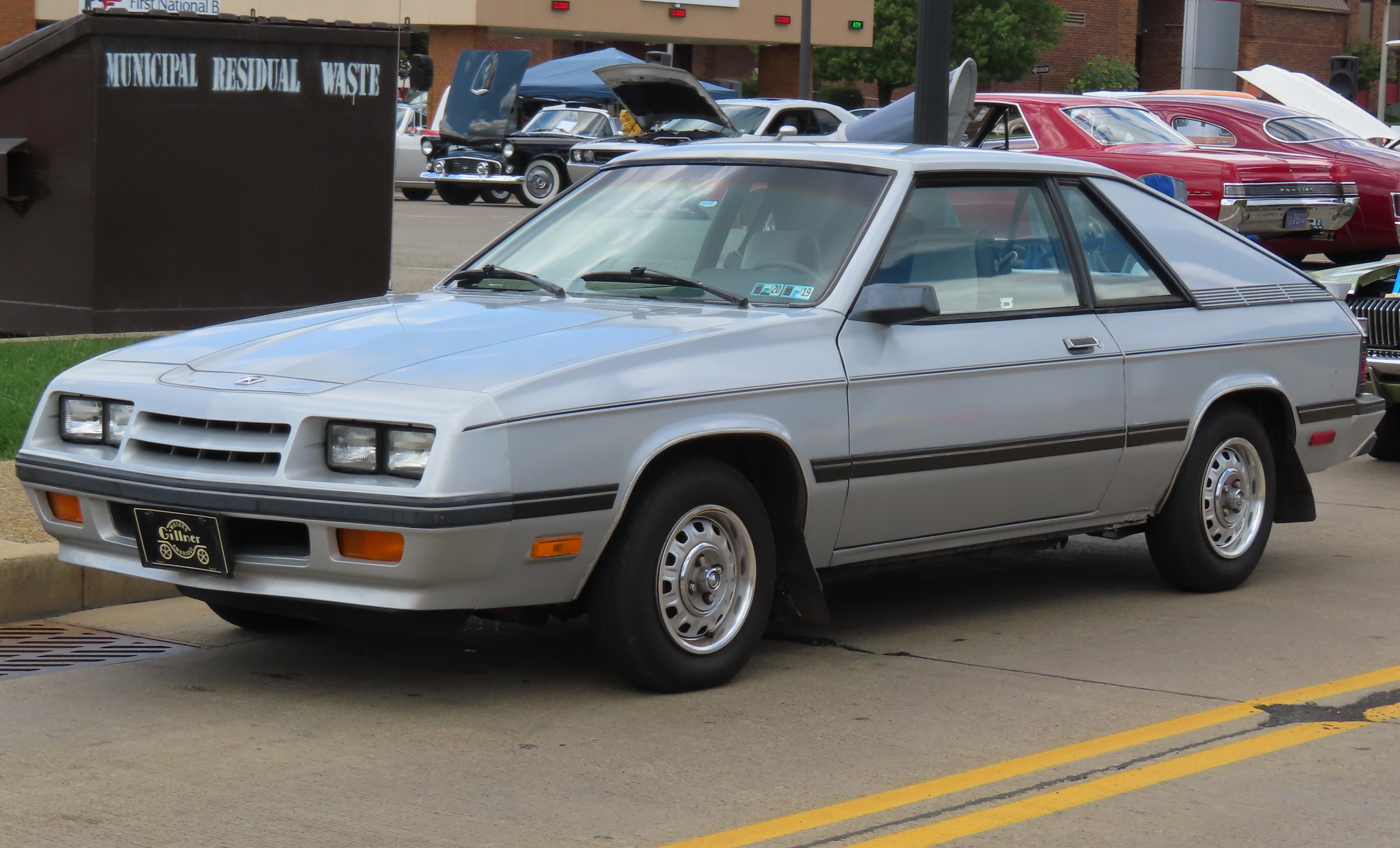
- Dodge Charger (L-body)

Overview
- Manufacturer: Dodge (Chrysler)
- Also called: Plymouth Turismo
- Production: October 1981–1987
- Model years: 1982–1987
- Assembly: United States: Belvidere, Illinois (Belvidere Assembly)

Body and chassis
- Class: Subcompact car
- Body style: 3-door fastback/hatchback
- Layout: Transverse front-engine, front-wheel drive
- Platform: L-body
- Related: Dodge Omni; Dodge Rampage; Plymouth Horizon; Plymouth Scamp; Shelby GLHS; Talbot Horizon / Alpine / Solara (Europe)

Powertrain
- Engine: 1.6 L Peugeot 6J I4; 1.7 L VW EA827 I4; 2.2 L K I4; 2.2 L Turbo I I4; 2.2 L Turbo II I4
- Transmission: 4-speed Volkswagen manual; 5-speed A525 manual; 3-speed A413 automatic

Dimensions
- Wheelbase: 96.5 in (2,451 mm)
- Length: 174.8 in (4,440 mm)
- Width: 66.1 in (1,679 mm)
- Height: 50.7 in (1,288 mm)

Chronology
- Predecessor: Dodge 024 / Plymouth TC3; Dodge Charger (4th generation)
- Successor: Dodge Shadow; Dodge Charger (6th generation)

The Dodge Charger (L-body) is a subcompact two-door hatchback/fastback built by Dodge from 1981 until 1987. It is based on Chrysler's front-wheel drive L platform. A companion model, the Plymouth Turismo, was also marketed.

== History ==
For the 1979 model year, Chrysler shortened the L-platform of the Dodge Omni/Plymouth Horizon four-door hatchbacks from 99.2 to 96.5 in (2,520 to 2,451 mm) in wheelbase to make more sporty two-door with a sloping hatchback called the Dodge Omni 024 and the Plymouth Horizon TC3. The cars shared a 70 hp (52 kW) 1.7 L Volkswagen inline-four as the only engine.

In 1981, the Charger nameplate returned as a performance package on the Omni 024. Called the Charger 2.2, it cost $399 extra and came with a hood scoop, quarter-window appliques, special gearing, rear spoiler, and "Charger 2.2" tape graphics, as well as the new 84 hp (63 kW) 2.2 L I4 engine that was designed and built by Chrysler. A total of 7,306 were built.

In 1982, the Dodge Charger returned for a second year as the performance option for the 024. Nothing was changed from 1981 except for a Pentastar emblem on its hood and adding a resonator to the exhaust since the previous model had no muffler, utilizing the catalytic converter as the sole method of engine noise reduction. Production increased to 15,000.

In 1983, the Volkswagen engine went out of production, so a joint Chrysler/Peugeot 1.6 L engine was used instead. The Omni 024 was renamed the Charger. The Plymouth Turismo was introduced as a companion entry for 1983, with the TC3 designation now discontinued. Carroll Shelby developed a sporty version of the Charger later in the year, the Dodge Shelby Charger.

The transformation continued in 1984, with quad headlights now differentiating the Charger from its Omni origins. However, the Shelby models continued to use the previous year's front nose cap/bumper assembly. The Plymouth Turismo would share the same front end. Apart from the badging, both cars were identical.

For the 1985 model year, the Shelby (with its unique front end) and Charger names were shuffled to reflect the addition of a turbocharged engine. One new color was added for 1985 — black with silver stripes. Plymouth also got a version of the old Shelby Charger, reviving the Duster name as the Plymouth Turismo Duster. However, Plymouth would never get a turbocharged version of the Shelby Charger. Two turbocharged Turismos, using the Shelby front end, were seen at Chrysler headquarters with a 'Cuda Plymouth badge, but they were not put into production. They currently reside in a private collection. The previous high-compression 107 hp (80 kW) Shelby Charger engine was now an option on regular Dodge Chargers. For 1986, a center high-mounted stop light was added, and the 96 hp (72 kW) 2.2 L engine became standard in the base models.

The 1987 model year was the last for the Omni/Horizon-derived Charger and Turismo. A total of 2,011 Chargers with the hotter 174 hp (130 kW) Turbo II engine were now badged the Shelby Charger Turbo (not "Dodge"). For 1987, they were replaced by the Dodge Shadow/Plymouth Sundance, and the Belvidere plant was retooled to build the Dodge Dynasty, which succeeded the preceding 600 at the time. Carroll Shelby bought 1,000 of the last Chargers and equipped them with the Omni GLH's engine and suspension to be sold under this name. The Duster name was revived for a model in the Plymouth Sundance line midyear in 1992. The Charger name, aside from the unrelated Dodge Ramcharger, would go on a more long-term hiatus until it was revived as a concept car in 1999 and eventually as a performance sedan in 2005; the nameplate had previously been on a brief hiatus from 1979 through 1981 after the Dodge Magnum replaced the original Dodge Charger (1966).

Production figures:

Dodge Charger production figures
	Yearly total
1982	14,420
1983	10,448
1984	54,264
1985	56,557
1986	50,655
1987	26,286
Total	212,630

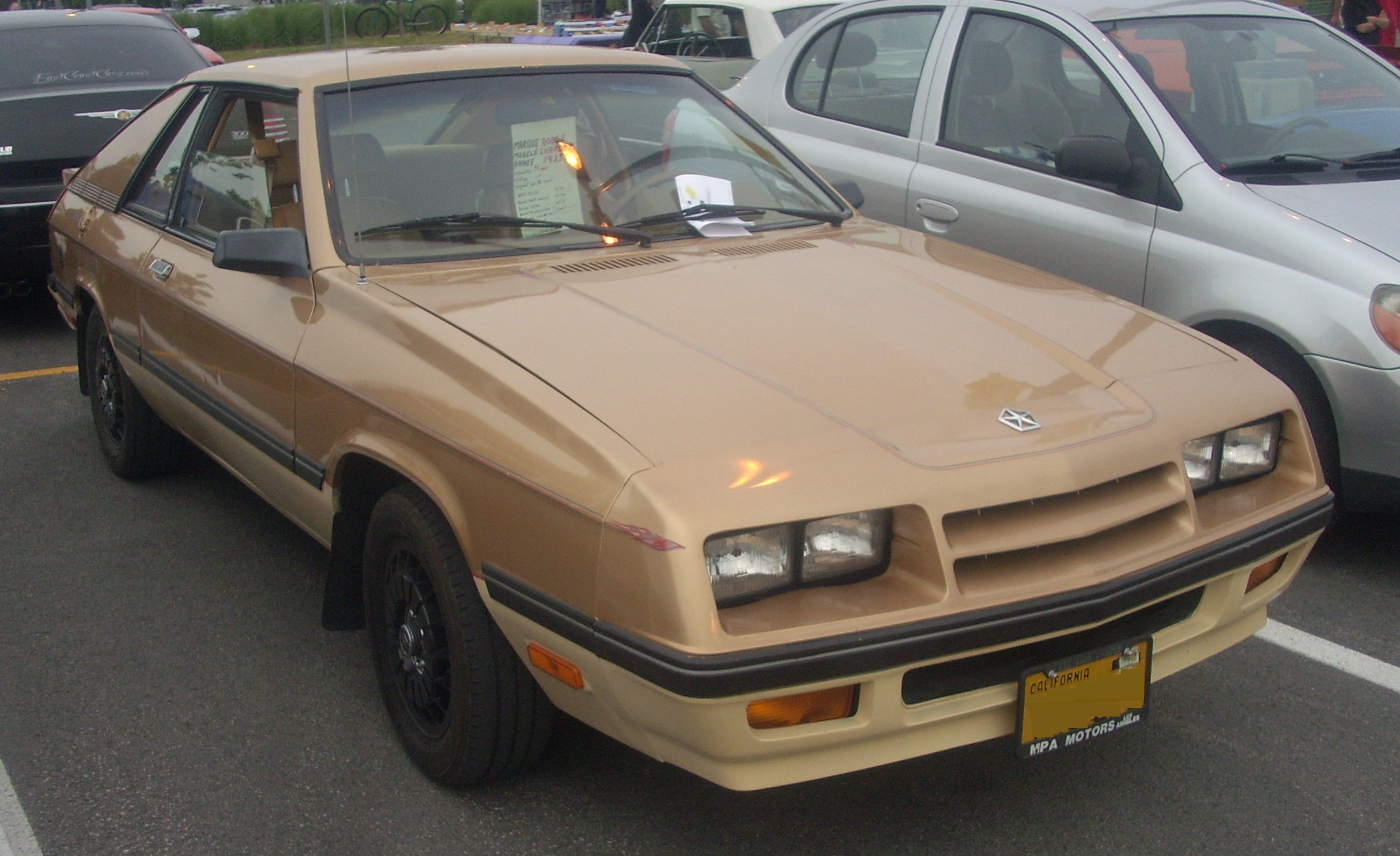
1985 Dodge Charger

1986/87 Plymouth Turismo

== Dodge Shelby Charger ==
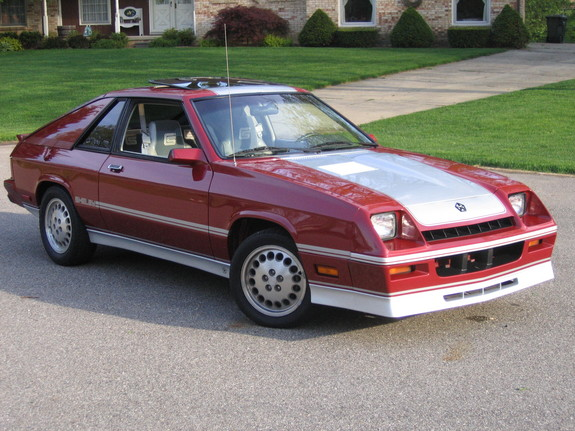
1987 Charger Shelby Edition

For 1983, Carroll Shelby modified the Dodge Charger, to be sold at Dodge dealers as the Dodge Shelby Charger. Rather than focusing on speed, Shelby modified the suspension and styling. The engine compression was raised for 107 hp (80 kW), and the manual transmission had revised ratios. Shorter springs, special wheels and tires complemented stronger brakes and a quicker, 14:1, power steering rack. Outside, a new nose and racing stripes accented the performance image. The car received a free-flowing exhaust system, making for a more aggressive sound. The body kits, among other parts, were often shipped to dealerships along with the car to be put on after delivery. The reasoning behind this varied, but was said to speed delivery and compensate for ground clearance issues that the cars faced on many car carriers. Production was 8,251 for that first year.

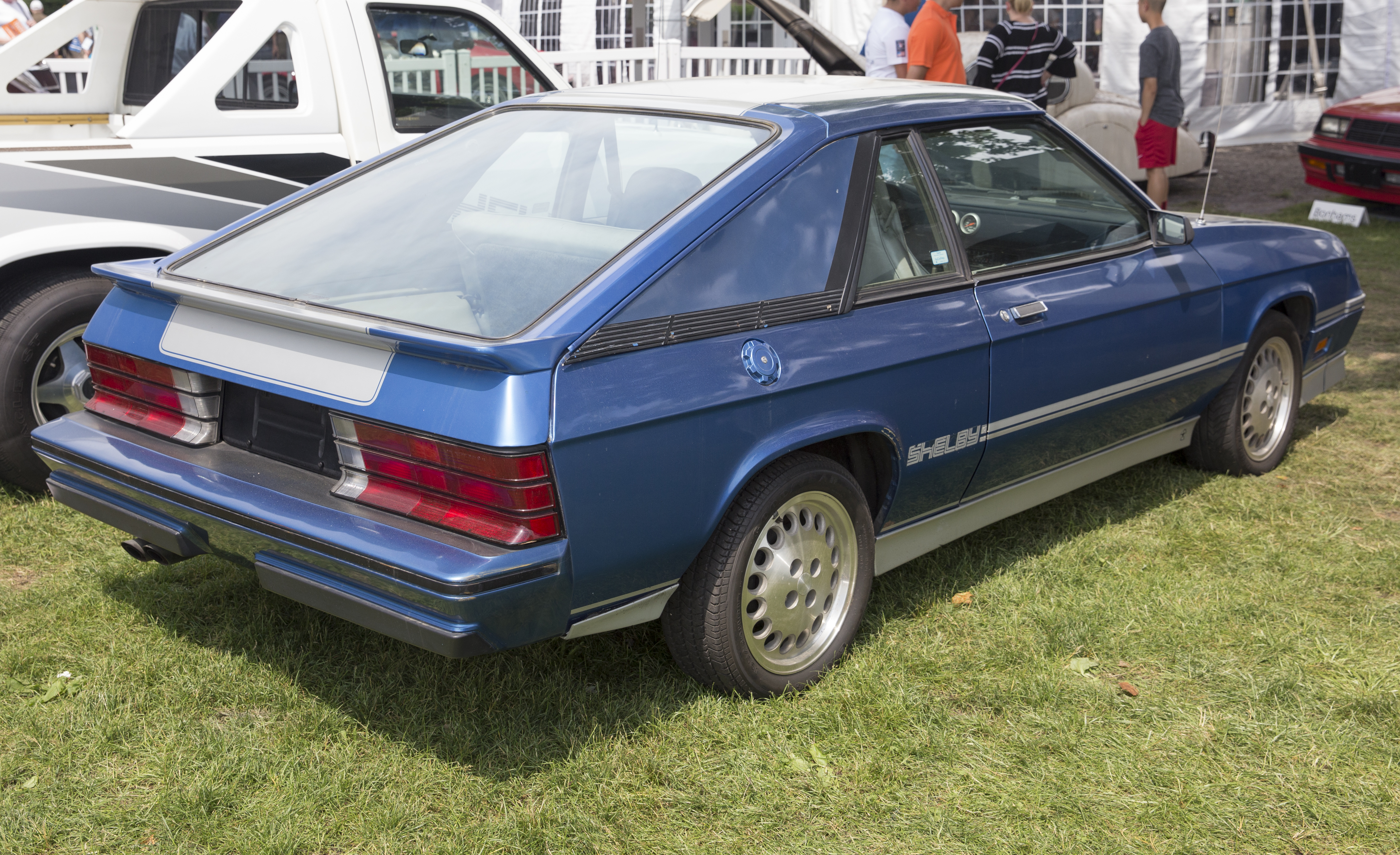
Rear view of the 1982 Dodge Shelby Charger prototype, mostly indistinguishable from production cars

For 1984, the Shelby Charger could be ordered with an optional automatic transmission. There were 7,552 Shelby Chargers sold this model year. The high-output engine (now up to 110 hp (82 kW)) was also available in baseline Chargers and Turismos. These vehicles came in "Charger 2.2" and "Turismo 2.2" schemes, which included Shelby Charger side ground effects, an additional, skinnier, front ground effect (different from the Shelby Charger's due to the quad-headlight fascia), "2.2" decals, and an optional hood scoop.

The MPFI/turbocharged Turbo I engine, commonly known as a "T1" was added for Dodge's 1985 Shelby Charger. This engine produced 146 hp (109 kW) and was changed from its first appearance in the Dodge Daytona Turbo during the previous year. A Garrett AiResearch T3 turbocharger and Chrysler/Bosch multiple-point fuel injection enabled the 2.2 L engine to produce the additional horsepower. A total of 7,709 Shelby Chargers were made for the 1985 model year, and 7,669 in 1986. 1987 was the final year, with just 1,011 produced, plus 1,000 more Shelby Chargers that were sent to Shelby's Whittier Plant in California, at which time they were modified as the 1987 Shelby GLHS. Dodge Shelby Chargers were available in four different color combinations: Black with silver skunk stripe (1984–1987), Santa Fe blue with silver skunk stripe (1983–1986), silver with Santa Fe blue skunk stripe (1983–1986), and Garnett red with silver skunk stripe (1984–1987).

== Charger GLHS ==
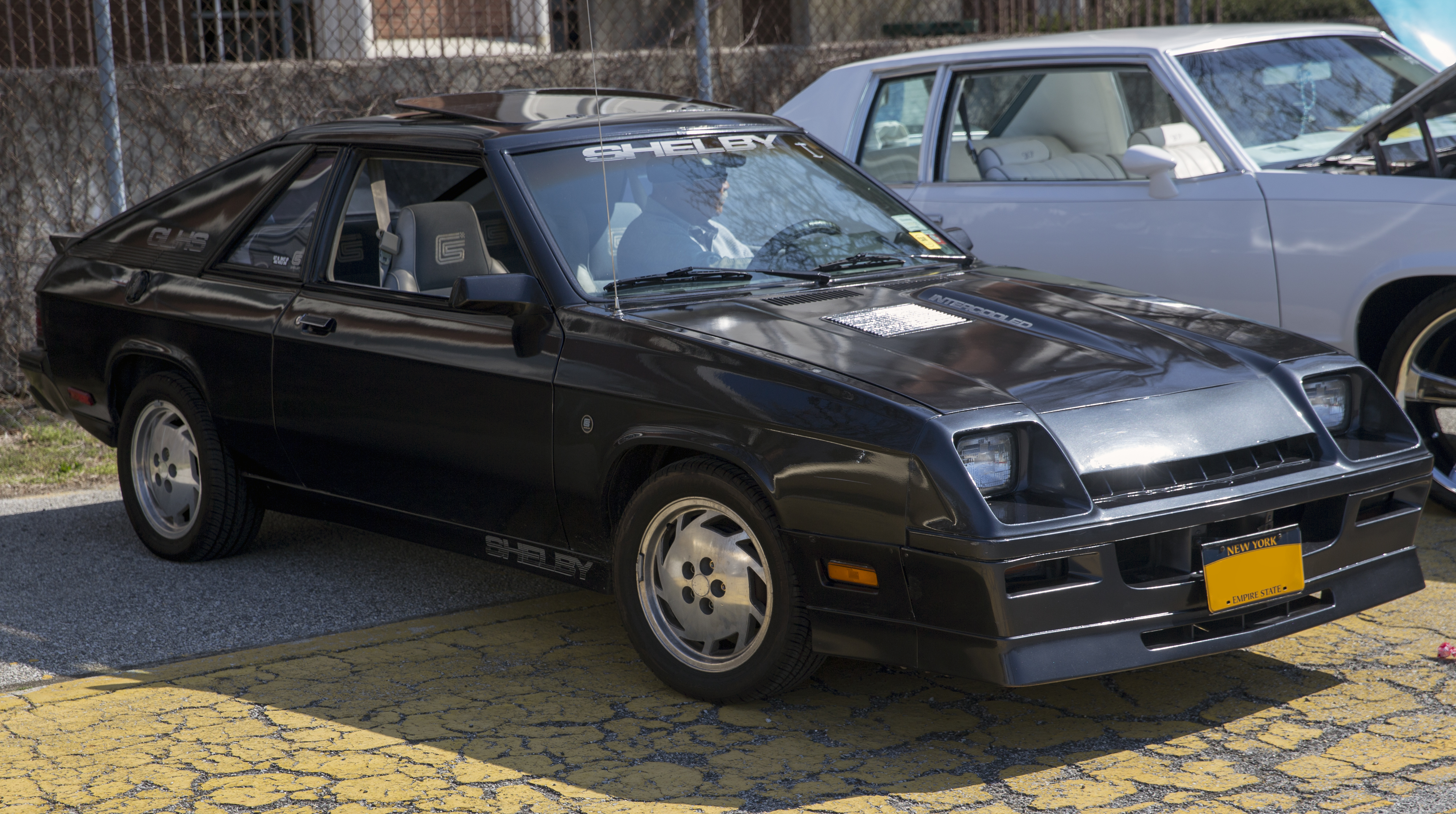
1987 Shelby GLHS

Carroll Shelby purchased 1,000 of the last Dodge Shelby Chargers and converted them into GLHSs in his facility at Whittier, California. Every vehicle was built and optioned the same way. All were finished in black and had special badging that marked them as Shelby, not as a Dodge. This was a continuation of the Omni GLHS from the previous year. Shelby used the Turbo I engine updated with the intercooler and plumbing of the Turbo II engine, but without the stronger forged crank, full-floating pin pistons, and other durability enhancements of that engine. It has a blow-through long runner two-piece intake and a modified turbocharger, reclocked with a different compressor cover. They were rated at 175 hp (130 kW) and 175 lb⋅ft (237 N⋅m) of torque from 2400 to 4800 rpm. The Turbo II also received a stronger Getrag A555 five-speed manual transmission in place of the rod linkage A525, which was still fitted to the GLHS models.

The suspension was upgraded with Koni adjustable struts/shocks and uprated Goodyear Eagle GT Z-rated tires. The Centurion 2 wheels were of Shelby's manufacture. A special sticker on the speedometer upped the readout to 125 mph (201 km/h). A special numbered Shelby Automotive badge went in place of the normal Charger badge. The modifications prompted the federal government to declare the car a Shelby model. No Dodge badges appear anywhere on the car, unlike its five-door L-body sibling, the GLH Omni, which does have the Dodge nameplate.
