= Plymouth Township =

Plymouth Township may refer to:

- Plymouth Township, Plymouth County, Iowa
- Plymouth Township, Russell County, Kansas
- Plymouth Township, Michigan
- Plymouth Township, Washington County, North Carolina, in Washington County, North Carolina
- Plymouth Township, Grand Forks County, North Dakota, in Grand Forks County, North Dakota
- Plymouth Township, Ashtabula County, Ohio
- Plymouth Township, Richland County, Ohio
- Plymouth Township, Luzerne County, Pennsylvania
- Plymouth Township, Montgomery County, Pennsylvania
