= Dodge Omni 024 =

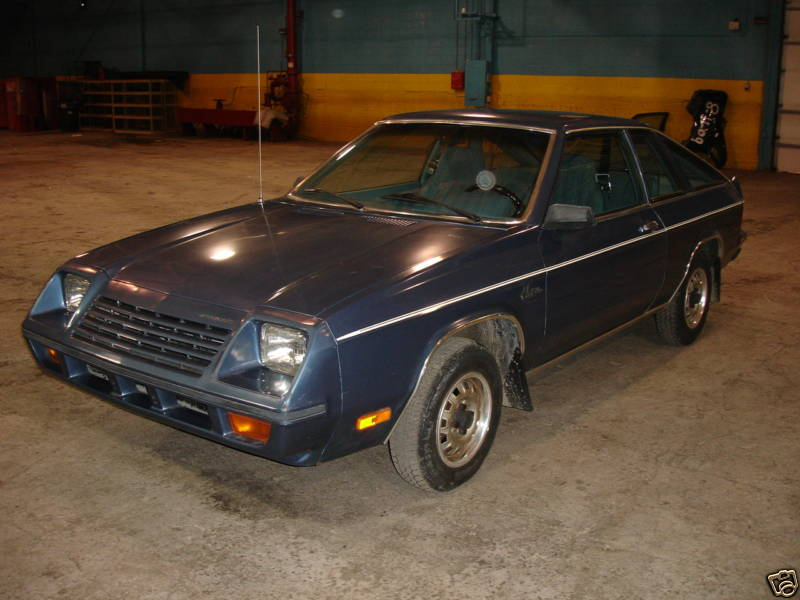
- 1979 Plymouth Horizon TC3

Overview
- Manufacturer: Dodge (Chrysler)
- Also called: Chrysler Omni 024 (Japan); Dodge 024; Plymouth Horizon TC3; Plymouth TC3
- Production: 1979–1982
- Assembly: United States: Belvidere, Illinois (Belvidere Assembly Plant)

Body and chassis
- Class: Subcompact
- Body style: 3-door hatchback coupe
- Layout: Transverse front-engine, front-wheel drive
- Platform: L-body
- Related: Dodge Omni; Dodge Rampage; Plymouth Horizon

Powertrain
- Engine: 1.7 L Volkswagen I4; 2.2 L K I4
- Transmission: 4-speed manual; 3-speed A404 automatic

Dimensions
- Wheelbase: 96.6 in (2,453 mm)
- Length: 174.0 in (4,419 mm)
- Width: 66.7 in (1,694 mm)
- Height: 50.8 in (1,290 mm)
- Curb weight: 2,551 lb (1,157 kg)

Chronology
- Successor: Dodge Charger / Plymouth Turismo

The Dodge Omni 024 is a version of the Dodge Omni made from 1979 to 1982. The car is a lower, sportier three-door hatchback coupé version of the Chrysler/Simca Horizon, using the five-door hatchback's floor pan and chassis as a basis, a similar formula to the Volkswagen Scirocco. The cars were designed in-house at the prompting of Lee Iacocca.

The Omni 024 used the same chassis and engine options as the Omni but had unique bodywork and front end styling. The base engine was a 1.7 L Volkswagen inline four producing 70 hp (52 kW), with a 2.2 L, 84 hp (63 kW) Chrysler inline four as an option beginning in 1981. By then, the smaller engine only produced 63 hp (47 kW). For the first year, the car had a folding back seat and the wheels were painted in the exterior color. The car's looks promised more performance than the engine could deliver, and the car was not as practical as the Omni. Both the Omni and Horizon prefixes were dropped for 1981, making them the "024" and "TC3", respectively.

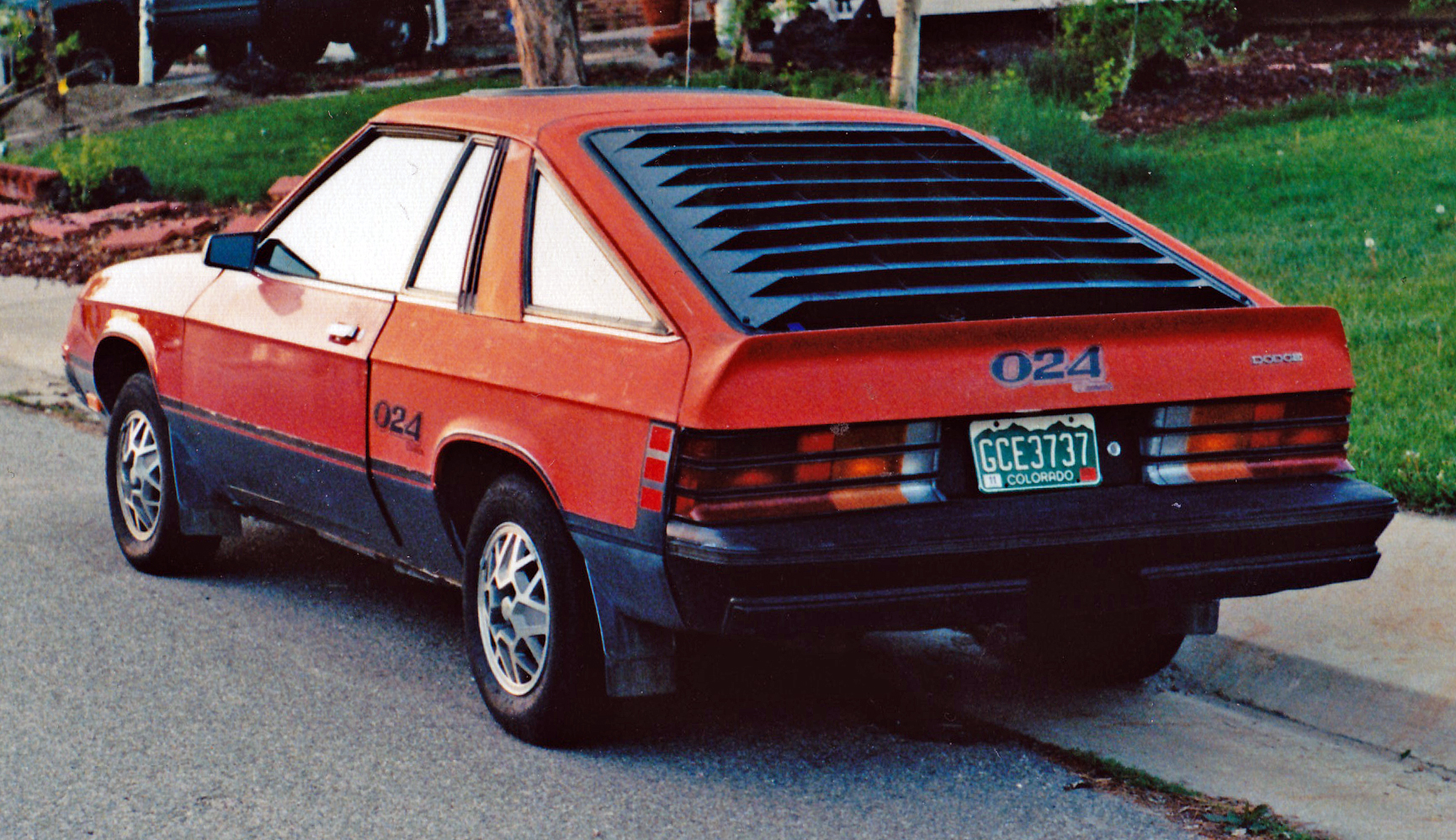
1979–1980 Dodge Omni 024 (rear view)

The 024 did not sell well and was renamed as the Dodge Charger for the 1983 model year, a name which had been gradually introduced as part of a special "Charger 2.2" package beginning in 1981. The 024 had also been produced as the Plymouth Horizon TC3. It, too, was renamed in the 1983 model year: to the Plymouth Turismo. The "Turismo" label had already been used on a sport package beginning in 1980.

In its last year, the 024 and TC3 served as a base for the Dodge Rampage and Plymouth Scamp pick-up trucks using the same chassis, powertrain and body parts from the doors forward.

In 1980 the Plymouth Horizon TC3 also became available with the Turismo sport package. For the Dodge Omni 024 this was called the De Tomaso package, with De Tomaso designed trim and wheels but the standard drivetrain. 1,333 De Tomaso 024's were built in 1980, followed by 619 more in 1981. The 1981 De Tomasos were only available with the new 2.2 litre engine.

Also in 1980, in cooperation with Chrysler partner Mitsubishi, the Chrysler Omni 024 was briefly sold in Japan. It was available for two years at Mitsubishi dealerships but didn't sell well, with only 1491 examples finding Japanese buyers.
