= Chrysler L platform =

Automobile platform, 1978–1990

Chrysler's L platform was used in a family of compact automobiles produced from 1978 to 1990. Loosely based on the Simca 1100 platform developed with Chrysler backing in Europe in the 1960s, the Chrysler L-body was the first domestically made car with transverse front wheel drive using a unibody chassis. It was created in response to the energy crisis of the 1970s and the desire to save internal costs by consolidating Chrysler's American and European operations. It was sold in North America in several lines of similar Dodge and Plymouth vehicles and discontinued when the Chrysler K platform was more successful.

- Dodge
  - 1978–1990 Omni
  - 1979–1982 Omni 024
  - 1982–1984 Rampage
  - 1983–1987 Charger
- Plymouth
  - 1978–1990 Horizon
  - 1979–1982 Horizon TC3
  - 1983 Scamp
  - 1983–1987 Turismo
- Chrysler Europe/Talbot
  - 1967–1985 Simca 1100
  - 1977–1984 Matra Rancho
  - 1977–1979 Chrysler-Simca Horizon
  - 1979–1987 Talbot Horizon

== See also ==
- List of Chrysler platforms
