= Plymouth Belmont =

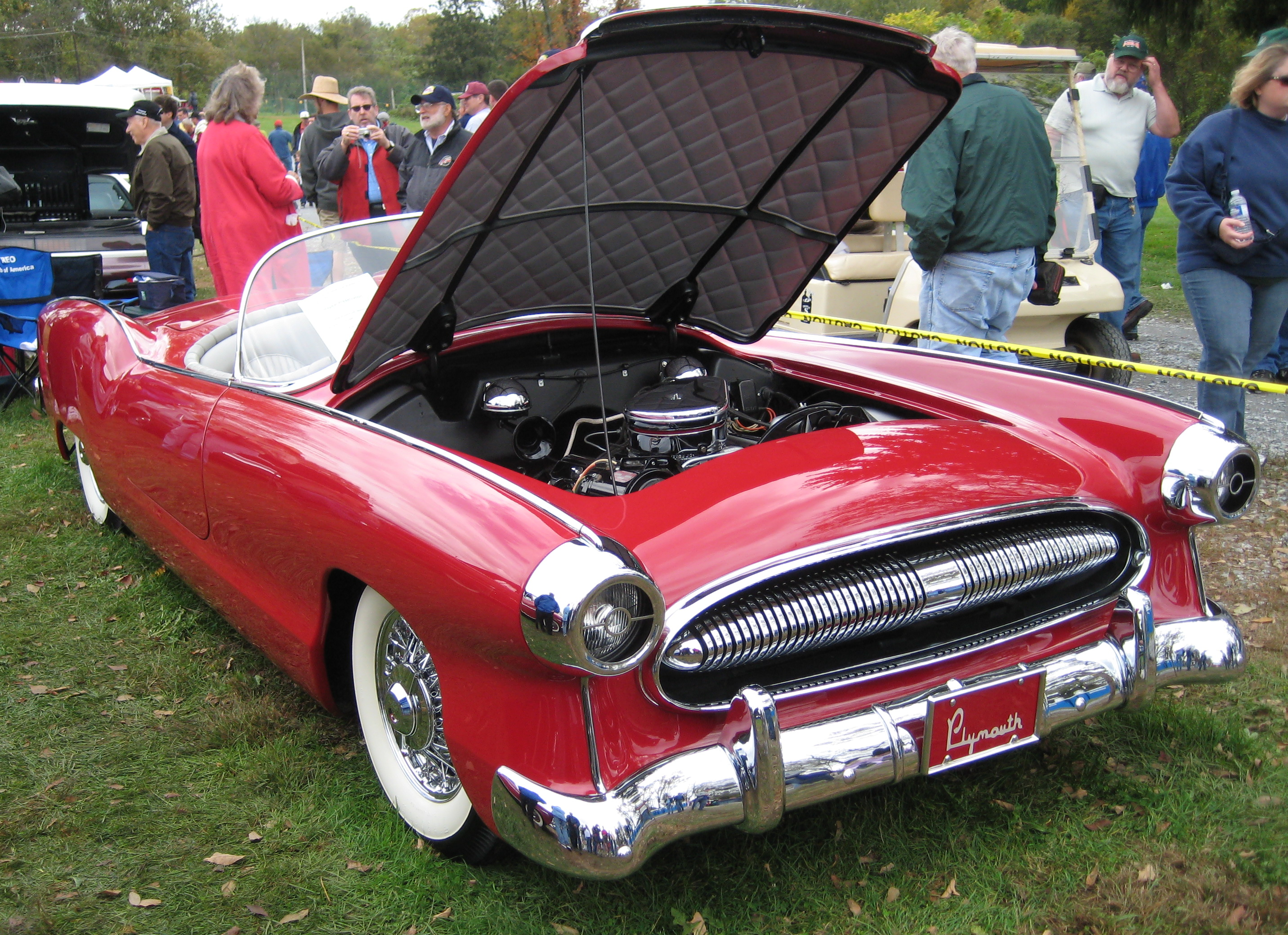

Overview
- Manufacturer: Plymouth (Chrysler)
- Production: 1953

Body and chassis
- Class: Concept car
- Body style: Roadster
- Layout: FR layout

Powertrain
- Engine: 241 ci (3.9L) Red Ram V8, 150 hp
- Transmission: 3-speed Hy-Drive semi-automatic

Dimensions
- Wheelbase: 114 in (290 cm)
- Length: 191.5 in (486 cm)
- Width: 73 in (190 cm)
- Height: 49 in (120 cm)

The Plymouth Belmont was a 1954 concept sports car built by Plymouth. It (and the 1954 DeSoto Adventurer concept car) were the first plastic-bodied cars by the Chrysler Corporation. The Belmont seated two and used a V8 engine, that produced up to 150 hp (112 kW). It was originally painted in a light blue metallic, it was painted red later. It was 191.5" long. Had it ever become a production model, its main competitors would have been the Chevrolet Corvette and the Ford Thunderbird.

There has been some disagreement as to who designed the Plymouth Belmont. Virgil Exner was originally identified as the designer. However, in Exner’s 2007 biography, he attributed the design to William “Bill” Robinson.

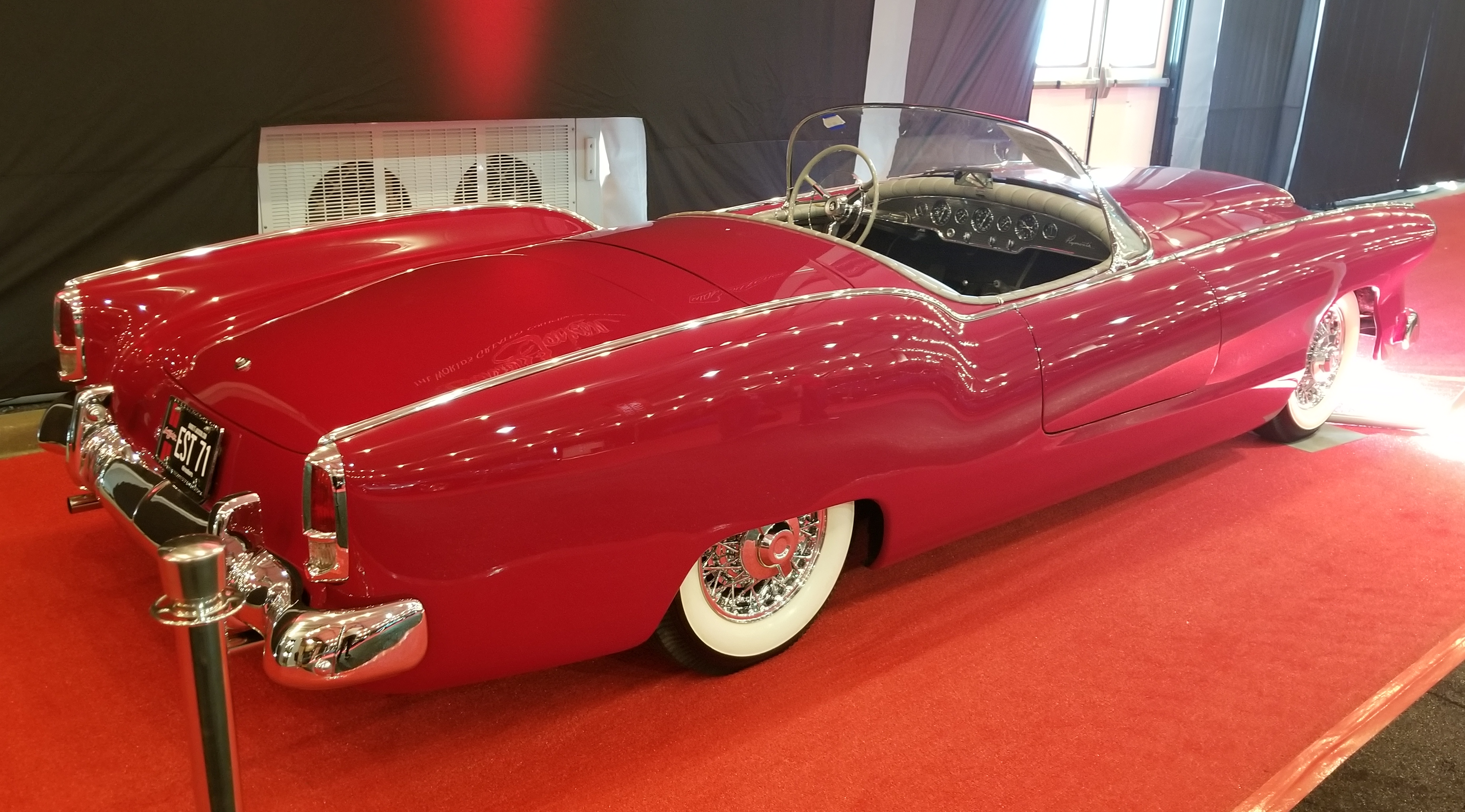
Rear view

Exner wrote that Chrysler, “was not in a financial position where it could afford to create a car to match the Corvette or the up-and-coming Thunderbird.” Therefore, a “major stipulation was that Robinson had to use stock parts wherever possible, including bumpers and light bezels."

"Robinson said that Chrysler's K.T. Keller did indeed want a Corvette competitor and that he instructed Al Prance at Briggs Manufacturing Company to begin work on one. Prance turned to Robinson, who had been with Briggs as a designer for about five years at that time. 'At first, I was thinking they wanted a real concept car, so I had drawings with fins and that nature,' Robinson said. 'But as the project progressed, I figured that they were looking more for a true sports car than a concept car, so I grew more conservative in my designs.'"

Robinson remembers that shortly after its release, "Ex walked into the Plymouth studio where he was by then working, ‘Ex came up to me and said, Bill, would you mind if I took credit for the Plymouth Belmont?' He was really nice about it, and I replied, 'Man, you can have credit for that thing if you want it' because for years I wouldn’t even admit that I was responsible for it but I guess it stood the test of time and I feel proud of it."
