= Shelby CSX =

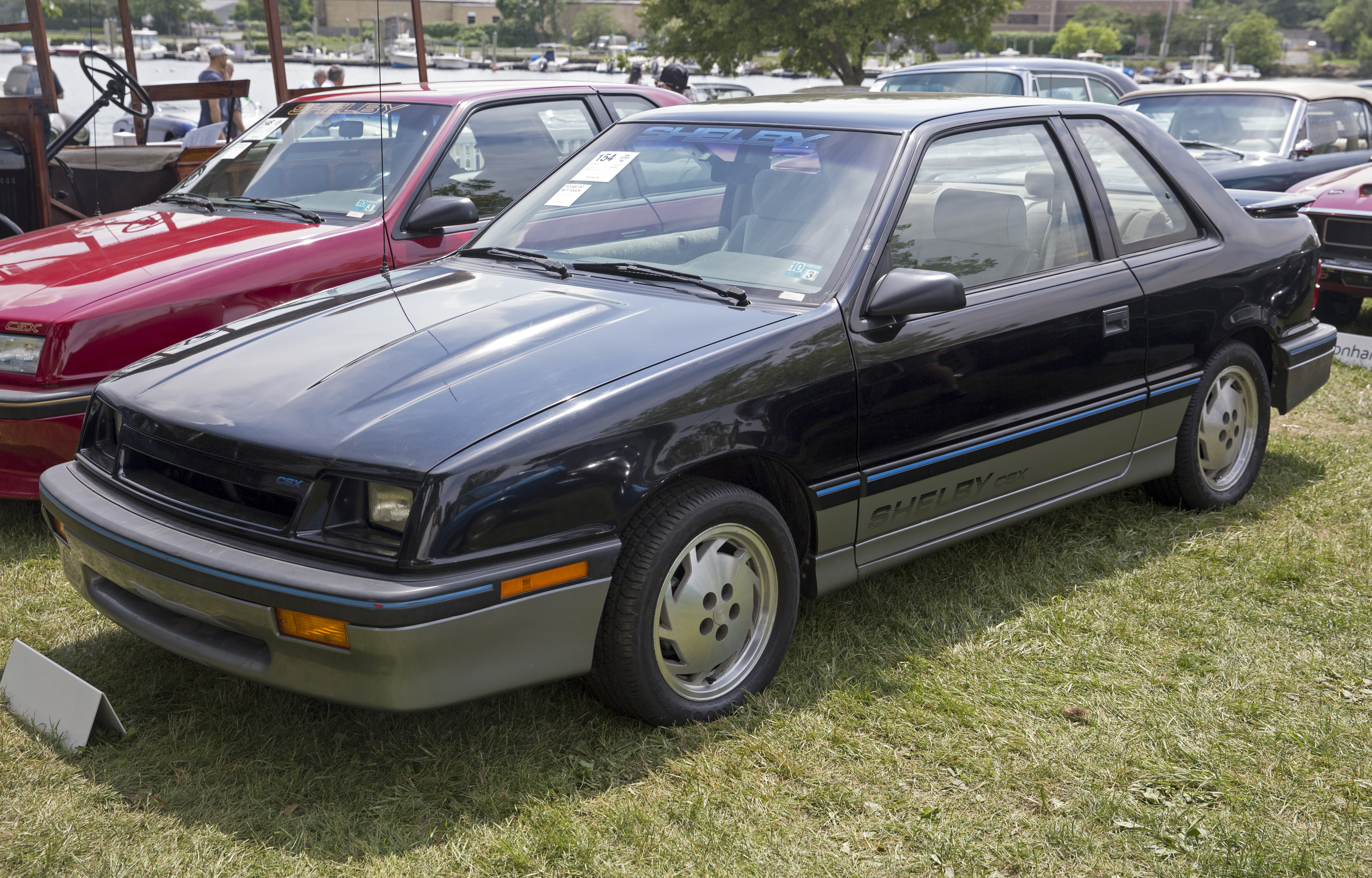
- 1987 Shelby CSX

Overview
- Manufacturer: Chrysler; Shelby American
- Also called: Shelby CSX-T; Shelby CSX-VNT
- Production: 1987–1989

Body and chassis
- Class: Sport compact
- Body style: 3-door hatchback 5-door hatchback
- Layout: Transverse front-engine, front-wheel drive
- Platform: P-body
- Related: Dodge Shadow; Plymouth Sundance

Powertrain
- Engine: 2.2 L Turbo I I4; 2.2 L Turbo II I4; 2.2 L Turbo IV I4
- Transmission: 5-speed A520 manual 5-speed A555 manual

The Shelby CSX (Carroll Shelby eXperimental) is a limited-production high performance automobile based on the turbocharged intercooled Dodge Shadow and Plymouth Sundance. These cars were offered by Shelby Automobiles Inc. from 1987 through 1989. The CSX serial number was established by AC Cars, in Surrey, England. The purpose of that serial number was to identify which chassis were to be exported to Shelby in the U.S. CSX stood for "Carroll Shelby Export".

== CSX ==
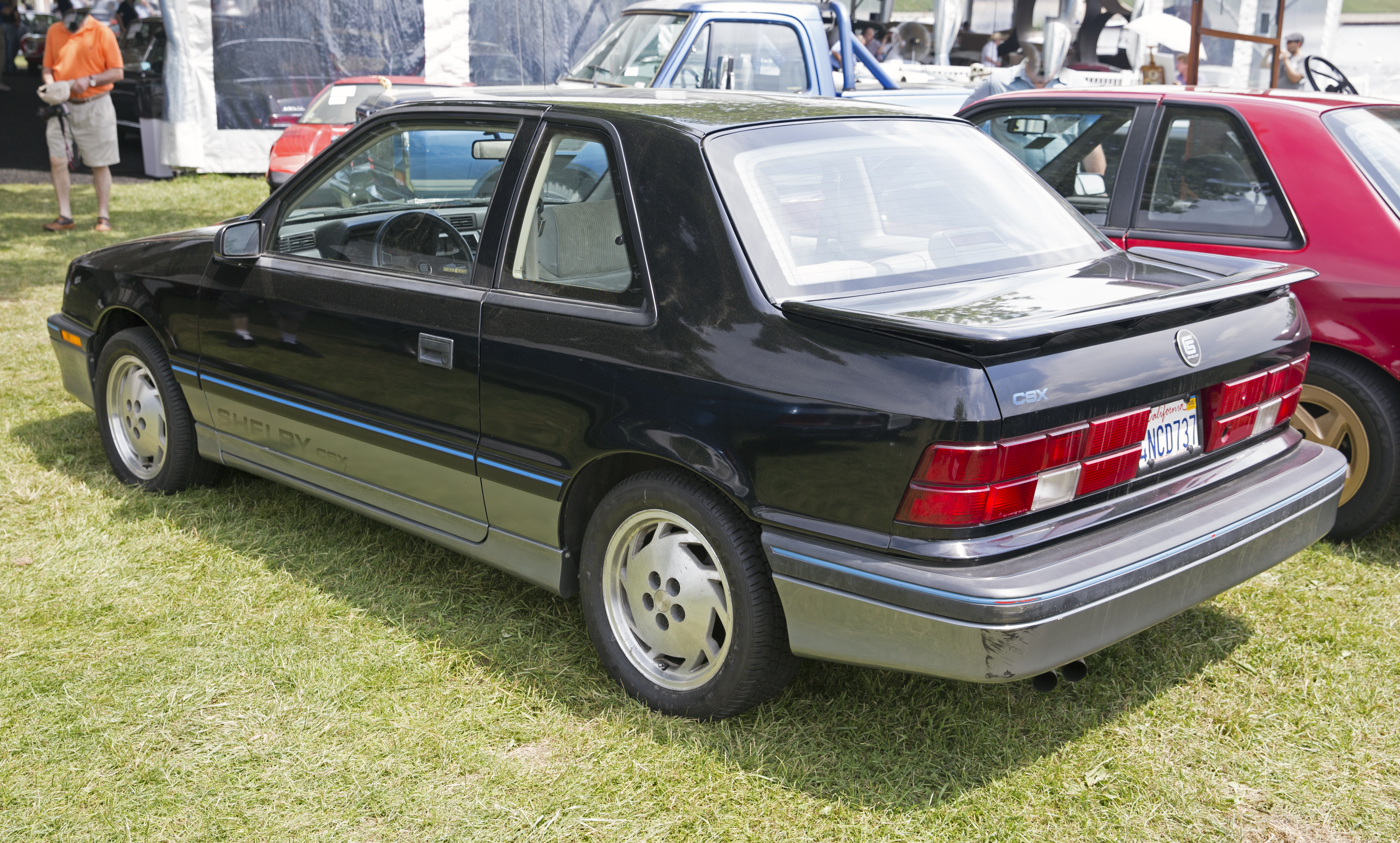
The first of the 750 built 1987 Shelby CSX

The first Shelby CSX appeared in 1987. Power came from Shelby's intercooled Turbo II 2.2 L inline-four, producing 175 hp (130 kW) at 5300 rpm and 175 ft·lbf (237 Nm) of torque from 2200-4800 rpm.

Shock absorbers and springs were replaced, and Daytona Shelby Z rear discs were added. Once again, Shelby used his own wheels. Outside badging was more restrained than other Shelby offerings. Black was the only color available.

750 of the 1987 CSX's were sold, priced at $13,495. There was no optional equipment.

== CSX-T ==
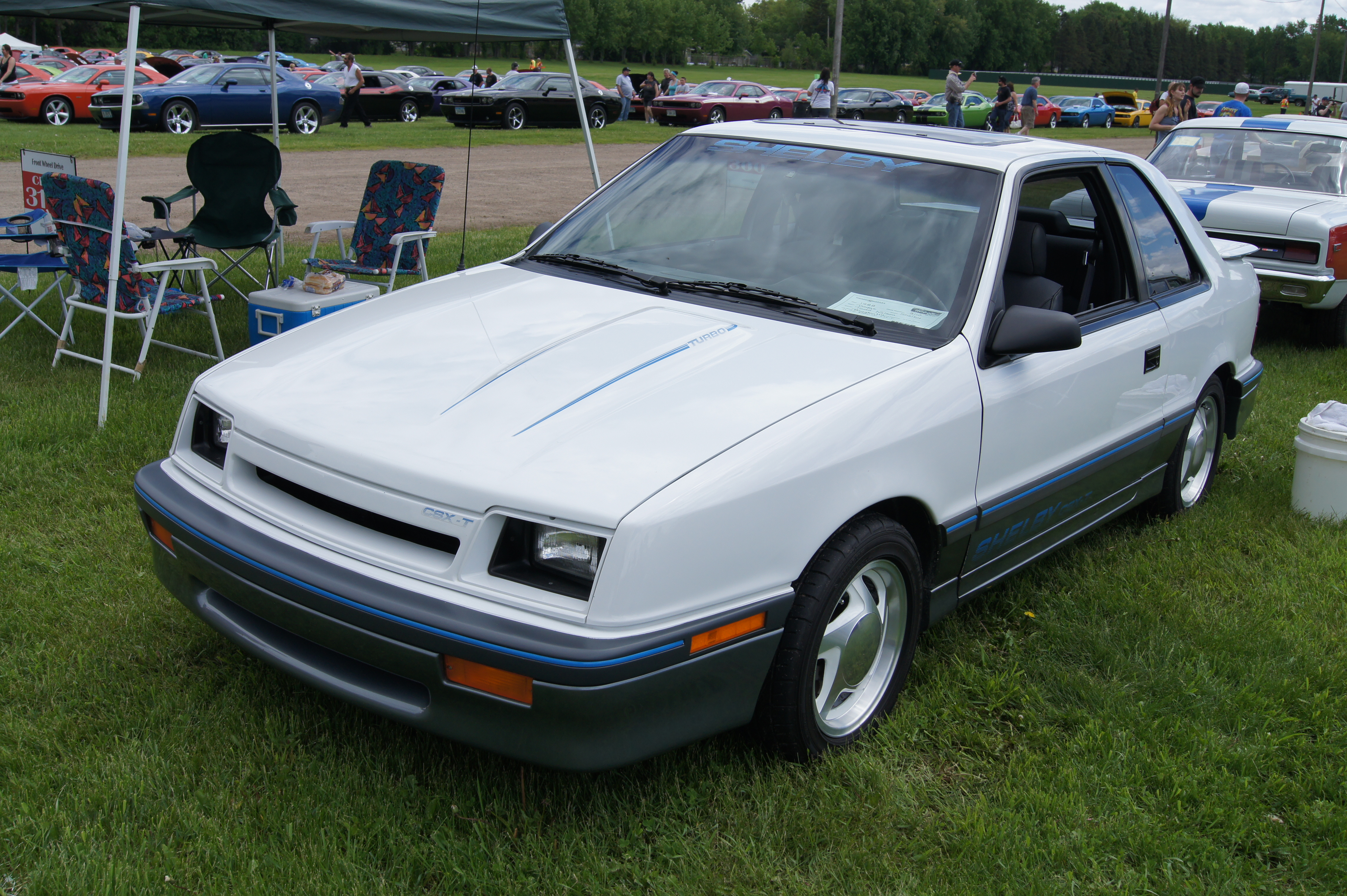
1988 Shelby CSX-T

In 1966, Shelby created a special line of Shelby Mustangs for the Hertz car rental company. Shelby repeated this method in 1988 with the creation of the CSX-T for the Thrifty rental company. The CSX-T was only sold to Thrifty. All 1,001 units produced were white with grey and blue trim.

The CSX-T was mechanically similar to the 1987 CSX, except the non-intercooled Turbo I engine was used. Two variations were made, an intercooled version given to the president of Thrifty and a version with a factory sunroof given to the president's daughter.

== CSX-VNT ==
The final CSX was 1989's CSX-VNT. This would also be the final Shelby Dodge, and marked two notable technological advances: the introduction of a Garrett variable-nozzle turbo (VNT), which was the first application of variable turbine technology in a production car, and the application of composite wheels designed by Shelby and produced by Motor Wheel Corporation, known as "Fiberrides", which were lighter than contemporary aluminum wheels.

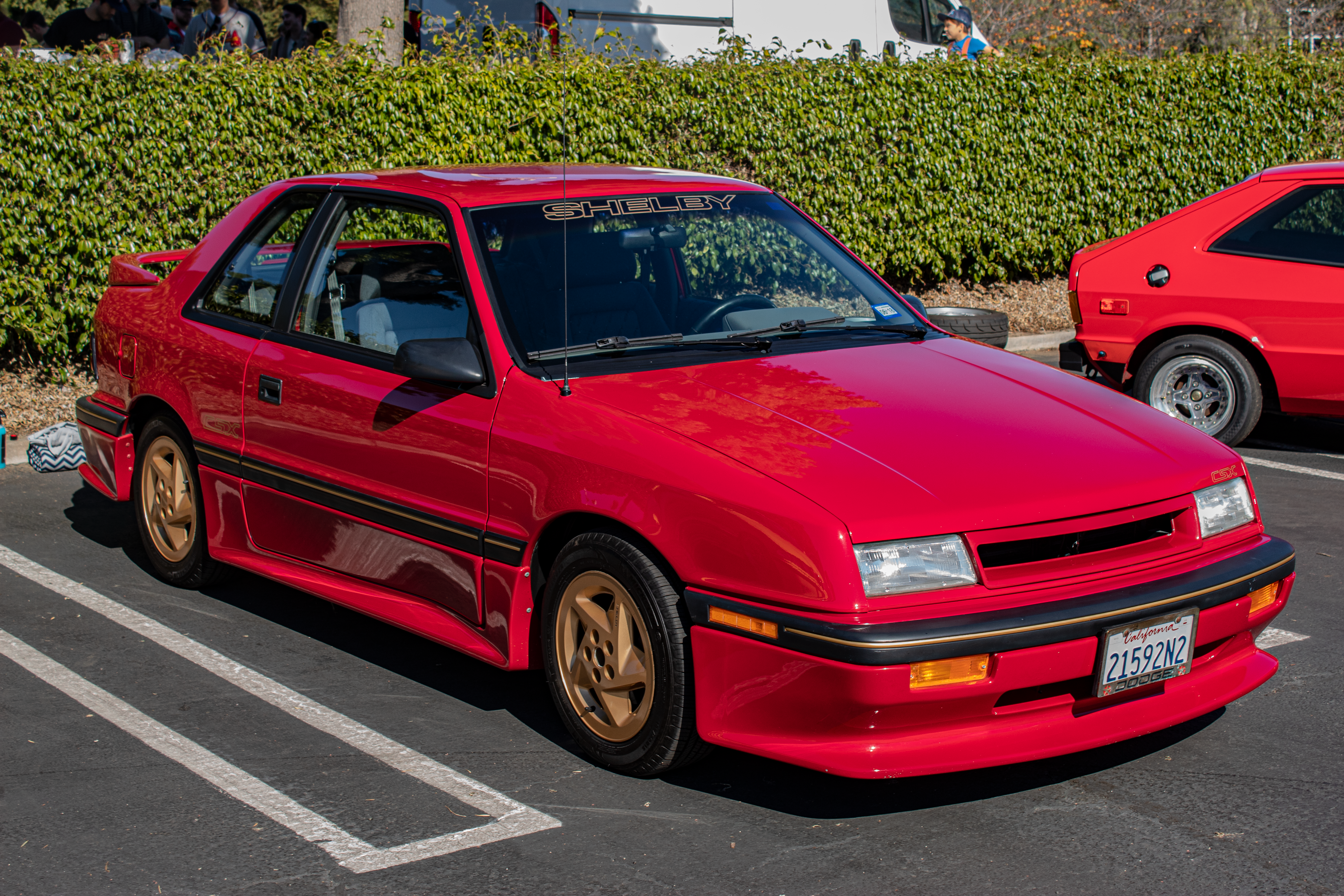
1989 Shelby CSX VNT, #001 of 500 produced

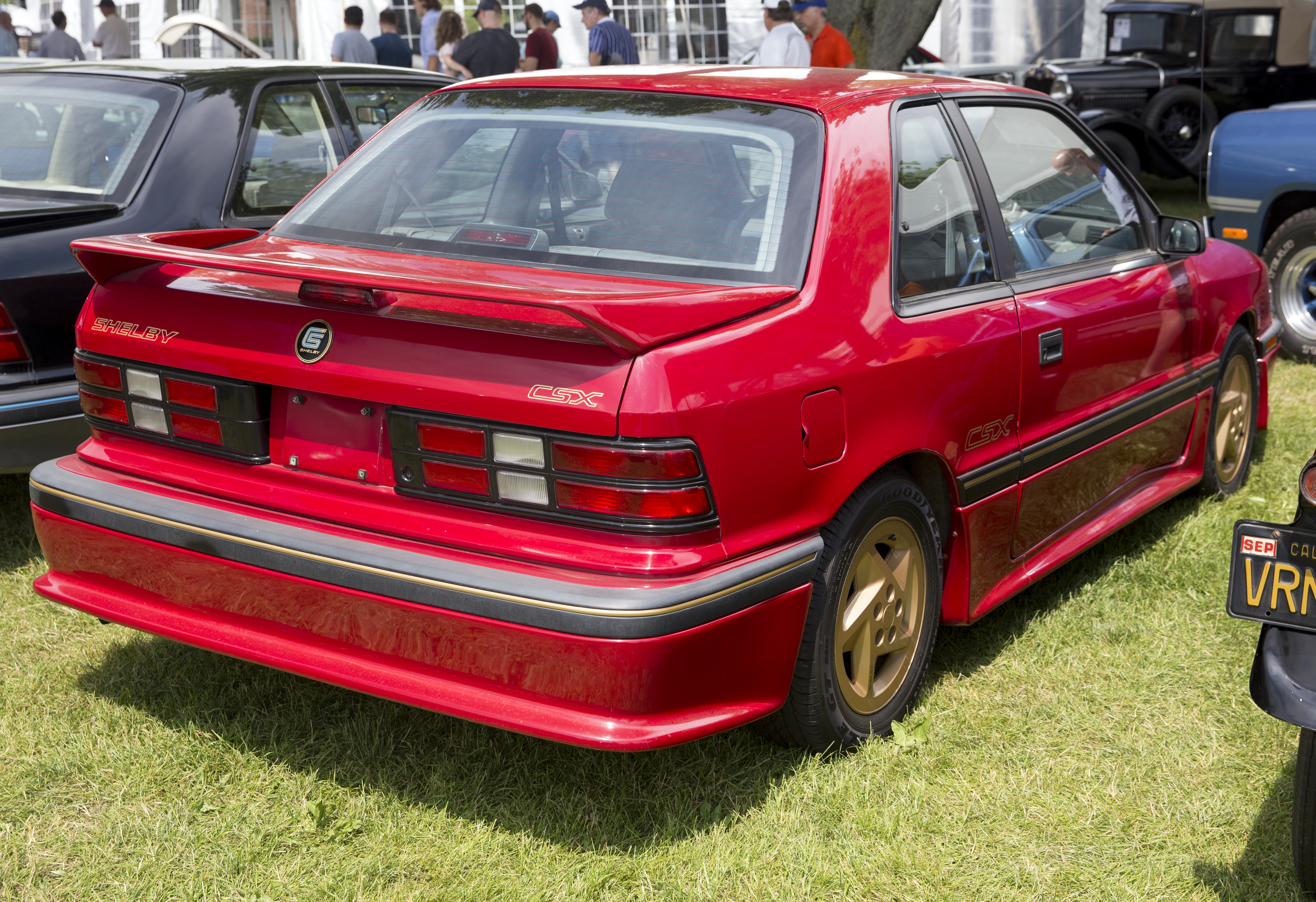
1989 Shelby CSX VNT rear

The engine was Chrysler's new intercooled Turbo IV equipped with a Getrag A555 5-speed transmission. The variable geometry turbo vanes were computer controlled and needed no wastegate. Instead, they adjusted the flow of exhaust gases to spool up instantly and provide strong power. Chrysler kept the horsepower rating at 175 hp (130 kW), but upped the torque rating to 205 ft·lbs (278 Nm) at 2100 rpm. Full torque was available from this low rpm to well past redline. Turbo lag was eliminated, with full boost (15 psi spike) available at 2100 rpm. Car and Driver magazine called it "a high-tech hot rod" and "a technological showcase" and were impressed with the engine's flexibility and top-gear acceleration. (They tested it to 156 mph (251 km/h).) Synthetic oil and premium fuel were specified for use with this car to prevent turbo overheating and prolong engine life. Rather than a proper tune-up (the VNT's control systems were advanced for the time), replacing the VNT with the simple but lag-prone turbo II was common. Examples with the VNT system intact are today considered more valuable to collectors. Shelby installed emblems in the engine compartment specifying Mobil 1 synthetic oil only, as he did on other Shelby Dodges. The suspension was also modified, as the alignment specs are radically different from the other Shelby Dodges. On the exterior, Shelby chose Exotic Red, a mix of bright red and maroon, with gold wheels and trim and a ground effects package produced by Kaminari Aerodynamics to set the VNT apart from the standard CSX. The MSRP was $15,995.

Production was limited to 500 vehicles (including two prototypes) and with the completion of cars, Carroll Shelby's direct involvement with Dodge was complete (although he continued to work on projects with Chrysler, often taking advisory roles, which included the development of the Dodge Viper and Viper GTS). The 89 Shelby CSX production figures can be broken down into the following: 15 were equipped as 'two option', coming factory with 225 wide tire option as well as RECARO bucket seats; 2 were used as prototypes; 2 were equipped with non-RECARO and wide optioned tires. The remaining were either RECARO or non-RECARO equipped cars with regular size tires. The front air dams and rear wing can still be purchased from Kaminari Aerodynamics. The wing is now equipped with an LED brake light built into it. The front air dams are slightly different than the original factory piece.
