= Chrysler TC by Maserati =

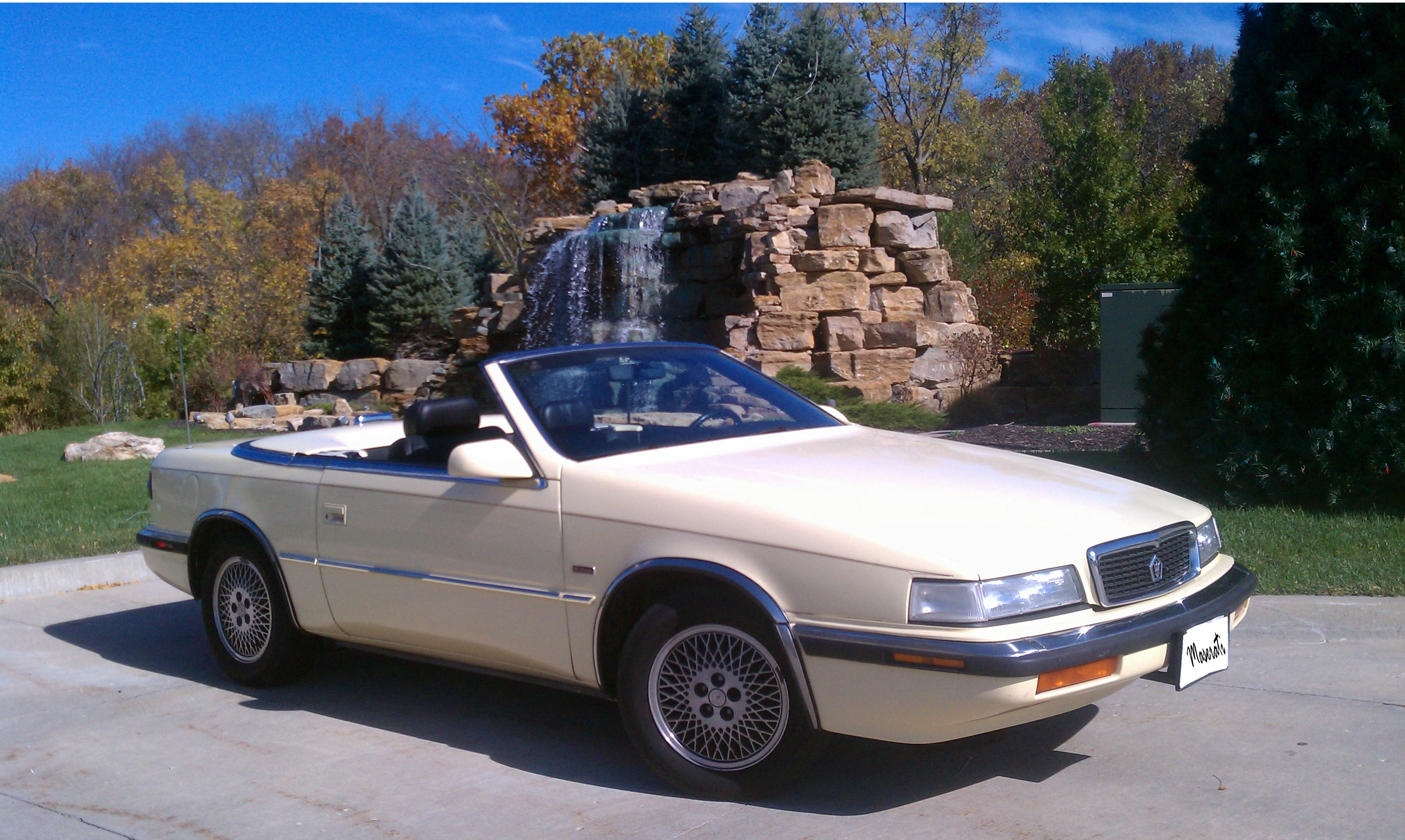

Overview
- Manufacturer: Maserati; Chrysler
- Production: 1988–1990
- Model years: 1989–1991
- Assembly: Turin, Italy (stamping); Sparone, Italy (assembly); Milan, Italy (Maserati's Innocenti complex; final assembly)

Body and chassis
- Class: Grand tourer (S)
- Body style: 2-door convertible
- Layout: Front-engine, front-wheel-drive
- Platform: Q-body

Powertrain
- Engine: 2.2 L Turbo II I4; 2.2 L TC I4; 3.0 L Mitsubishi 6G72 V6
- Transmission: 5-speed Getrag 284 manual; 3-speed A413 automatic; 4-speed A604 automatic

Dimensions
- Wheelbase: 93.3 in (2,370 mm)
- Length: 175.8 in (4,465 mm)
- Width: 68.5 in (1,740 mm)
- Height: 51.9 in (1,318 mm)
- Curb weight: 3,033 lb (1,376 kg)

The Chrysler TC by Maserati is a two-seat, two-door convertible jointly developed by Chrysler and Maserati. Introduced at the 1986 Los Angeles Auto Show., the TC was positioned as a grand tourer using a "Q" body on a modified second-generation Chrysler K platform. After two years of development delays, the TC became available in late-1988 and a total of 7,300 units (the minimum required under the contract) were manufactured in Milan, Italy, through 1990. All cars sold as 1991 models were manufactured in 1990.

== Development ==
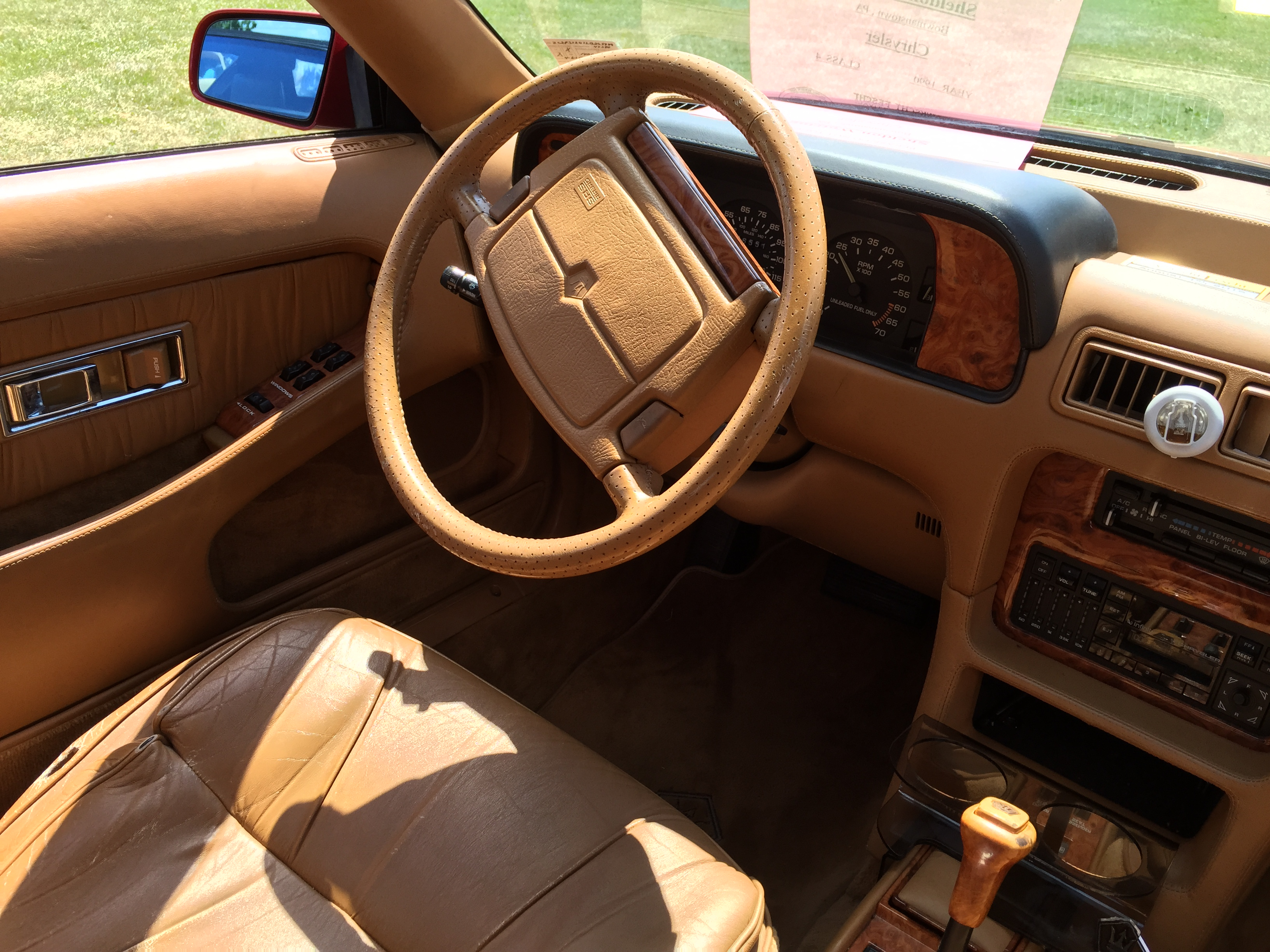
TC by Maserati interior

Lee Iacocca started a friendship with Alejandro de Tomaso while at Ford, which led to the De Tomaso Pantera, which had flopped because of safety concerns and limited interest from buyers. During the 1980s, Iacocca headed Chrysler while De Tomaso was the owner of the historic Maserati brand. In 1983, Iacocca had considered manufacturing a knock-off of a Mercedes roadster based on a Plymouth Reliant-until he was talked out of it.

In 1984, both companies signed a memorandum of understanding to create a sports coupe that ultimately became the TC, or "turbocharged coupe", an "image builder" which carried the hopes that it might help overcome Chrysler's blue-collar image and attract better-heeled customers to showrooms, and a revival of the luxury reputation they enjoyed during the late 1950s to mid-1960s with the Chrysler 300 letter series coupes and convertibles.

Chrysler also became an investor in Maserati during that period. In 1985, Lee Iacocca stated that the planned "Q-coupe" would be the prettiest Italian to arrive stateside since his mother immigrated. The luxury roadster, which resembled a Chrysler LeBaron—it shared many of the LeBaron's components—had taken five years to complete because of mismanagement and squabbling among Chrysler and Maserati engineers which resulted in delay after delay. The original plan was for the TC to be introduced before the LeBaron.

The 1989 TC used a slightly detuned 160 bhp (119 kW; 162 PS) Daytona-spec turbocharged 2.2 L straight-4. This intercooled version, known as the Turbo II, was coupled to an A413 three-speed automatic transaxle. The Turbo II was replaced by a Mitsubishi-sourced 3.0 L 141 bhp (105 kW; 143 PS) V6 engine for the 1990 and 1991 model years, with the automatic transaxle being upgraded to a four-speed A604 unit.

500 cars were built with an optional drivetrain consisting of a Getrag manual transmission and a 16-valve head version of the 2.2 L. This engine is often called the "Maserati" engine because it was assembled by Maserati and has a Maserati-branded cast valve cover.

The 200 hp (149 kW; 203 PS) 16-valve 2.2 L "Maserati" engine's cylinder head was cast in England by Cosworth and finished in Italy by Maserati. The pistons came from Mahle GmbH in Germany. The camshafts were designed by Florida-based Crane Cams and were manufactured by Maserati in Modena. The "Maserati" engine used a specially made 2.2 block, upgraded crankshaft, and rods. A Japanese turbocharger was sourced from IHI. The rest of the engine used Turbo II parts made in the United States.

The TC's platform was based on a shortened Dodge Daytona chassis with suspension and axles from the original model (except for the 5-speed Getrag with "Maserati" engine). The bodywork was produced by De Tomaso subsidiary Innocenti. The struts and shock absorbers were specially designed for the car by Fichtel and Sachs, and a Teves anti-lock braking system was standard. The special wheels were made in Italy by the Formula One supplier Fondmetal.

After every other Chrysler executive insisted that the TC was hopeless and should be written off, Iacocca refused to accept responsibility for its failure saying it might have worked if his marketers had "positioned" it properly. According to Bob Lutz, a Chrysler executive, the partnership with Alejandro de Tomaso resulted in only the TC, a "misadventure" that wound up costing Chrysler "close to $600 million." That is, the cost to produce each of the 7,300 TCs was about $80,000 in 1990 dollars ($197,147 in 2025 dollars).

== Features ==
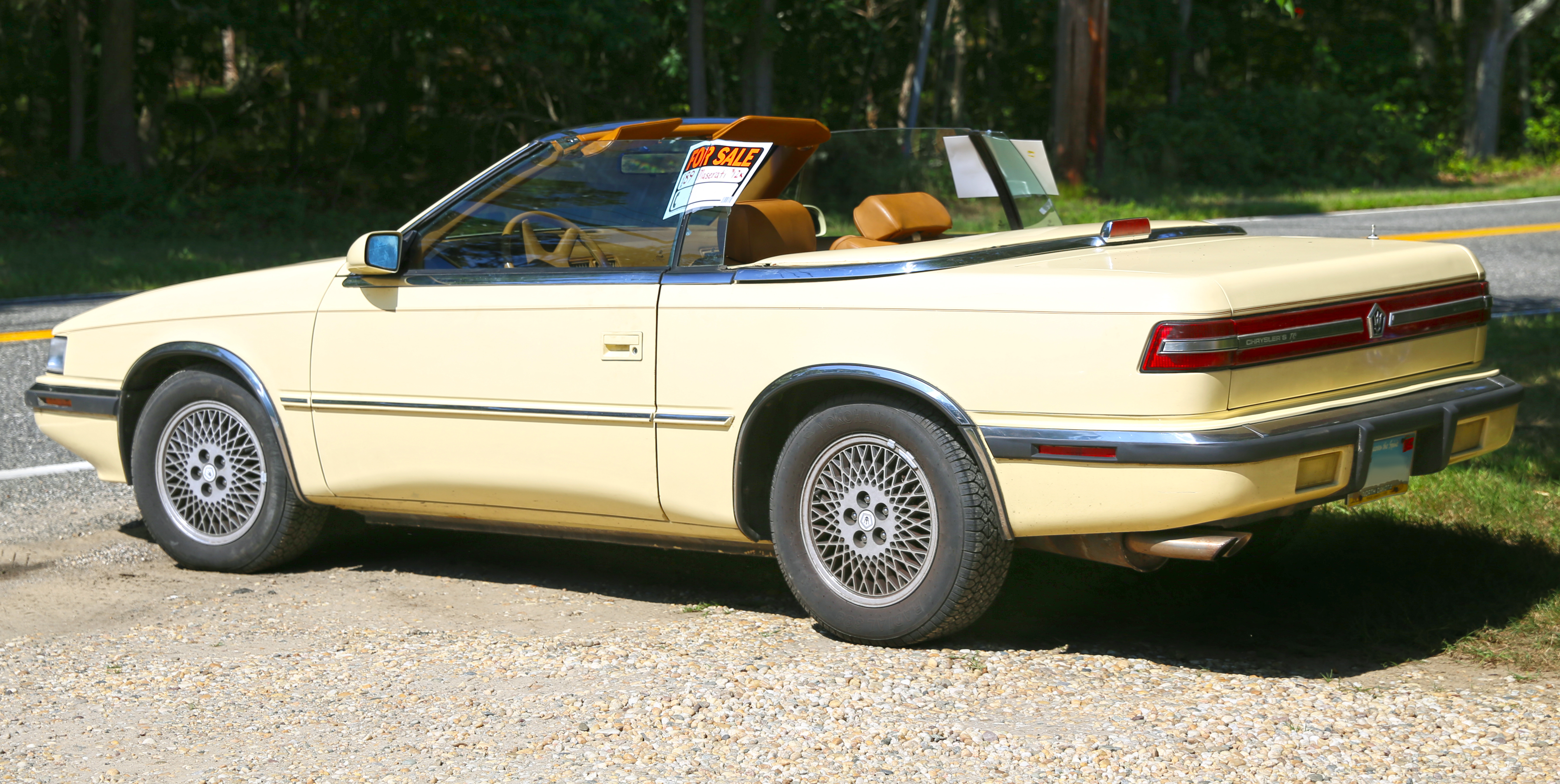
Rear view of 1989 Chrysler TC by Maserati

The TC featured a detachable hard top with circular, beveled-glass opera windows with a six-point latching system and a manually operated cloth lined convertible top that was available in either tan or black. For the 1989 model year, interior leather colors were ginger or bordeaux. Available exterior colors were yellow, red, or cabernet. The bordeaux interior was only available with the cabernet exterior, both of which were dropped in 1990 when black and white exterior colors were added along with a black leather interior.

The TC's dash, door panels, seats, armrest, and rear fascia panels were covered in hand-stitched Italian leather. Inside doorjambs were finished with stainless steel panels and sill plates. The convertible boot, over which the hardtop rests, is a body-colored metal panel. A special interior storage compartment came with an umbrella, tool kit, and small spare tire that allowed the use of the full-sized trunk even with the top down. Standard equipment included a 10-speaker Infinity AM/FM cassette stereo, power windows, 6-way power seats, power door and trunk locks, map lights, puddle lamps, cruise control, and a tilt steering wheel.

The only extra cost option available for the TC was a CD player that used a plug-in attachment to the standard Infinity AM/FM cassette stereo. All drivetrain alternatives were no-cost options.

A unique TC was built as a "special order" at the end of the production run for a Chrysler executive. It was white with a bordeaux interior and the Maserati 16V engine, the only 1991 car to have that color interior or engine.

== Production and prices ==
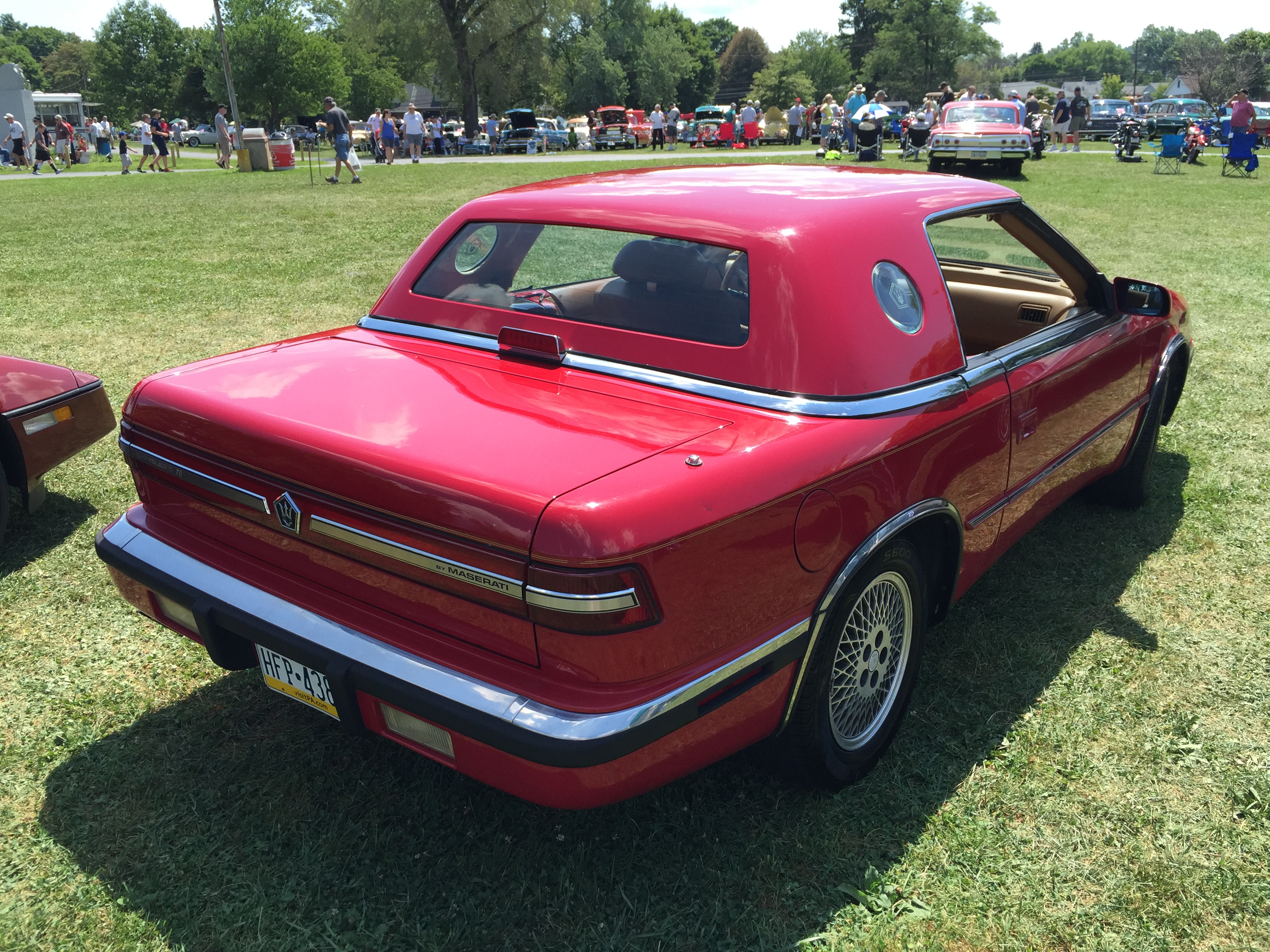
Chrysler TC by Maserati with the standard hardtop fitted

Total production and base price for each model year. The TC was sold by 300 select Chrysler dealers.

Model Year	Production	Base Price (USD)
1989	3,764	$33,000 ($85,711 in 2025 dollars)
1990	1,900	$35,000 ($86,252 in 2025 dollars)
1991	1,636	$37,000 ($87,460 in 2025 dollars)

== Competition ==
During the TC's three-year run, General Motors was offering two luxury roadsters. The Cadillac Allanté (1987–93), which was priced significantly higher than the TC, and the Buick Reatta convertible (1990–91) which was priced similarly to the TC. The Allanté was also Italian-designed and partially hand-built.

The Allanté was powered by a 200 hp (149 kW; 203 PS) 4.5 L V8 engine during the years the TC was sold (1989–91) with final assembly in the U.S. after the bodies built in Italy were shipped via special air cargo, while the Reatta was a 170 hp (127 kW; 172 PS) 3.8 L V6-powered roadster.

== Criticism and aftermath ==
The original idea of combining a Chrysler engine with a Maserati body was viewed by some automotive journalists as "taking the worst from each partner." The press was critical of the Chrysler TC, observing its similarity to the Chrysler LeBaron GTC convertible that cost much less. Lee Iacocca was a proponent of the new model "to change the way the world looked at Chrysler" and to create a new image for the automaker. Though the TC was expected to achieve annual sales between 5,000 and 10,000 units, it sold very poorly due its high price tag among other factors such as the lack of exterior color choices and undistinguished performance. In contrast, the LeBaron GTC had more color choices and exactly the same features at a considerably lower price. A genuine European luxury car could be purchased for not much more than the Chrysler TC, reviewers pointed out. One expert on the Chrysler TCs claims that the automaker under Iacocca invested millions into Maserati, "but the Italian firm just did not deliver as promised" and the automobile marketplace had changed by the time the cars were delivered.

Subsequent to TC production, Chrysler and Maserati eventually had common corporate ownership, as Fiat would take over Maserati in 1993, followed by a takeover of Chrysler in 2013.
