= Chrysler K platform =

K-platform
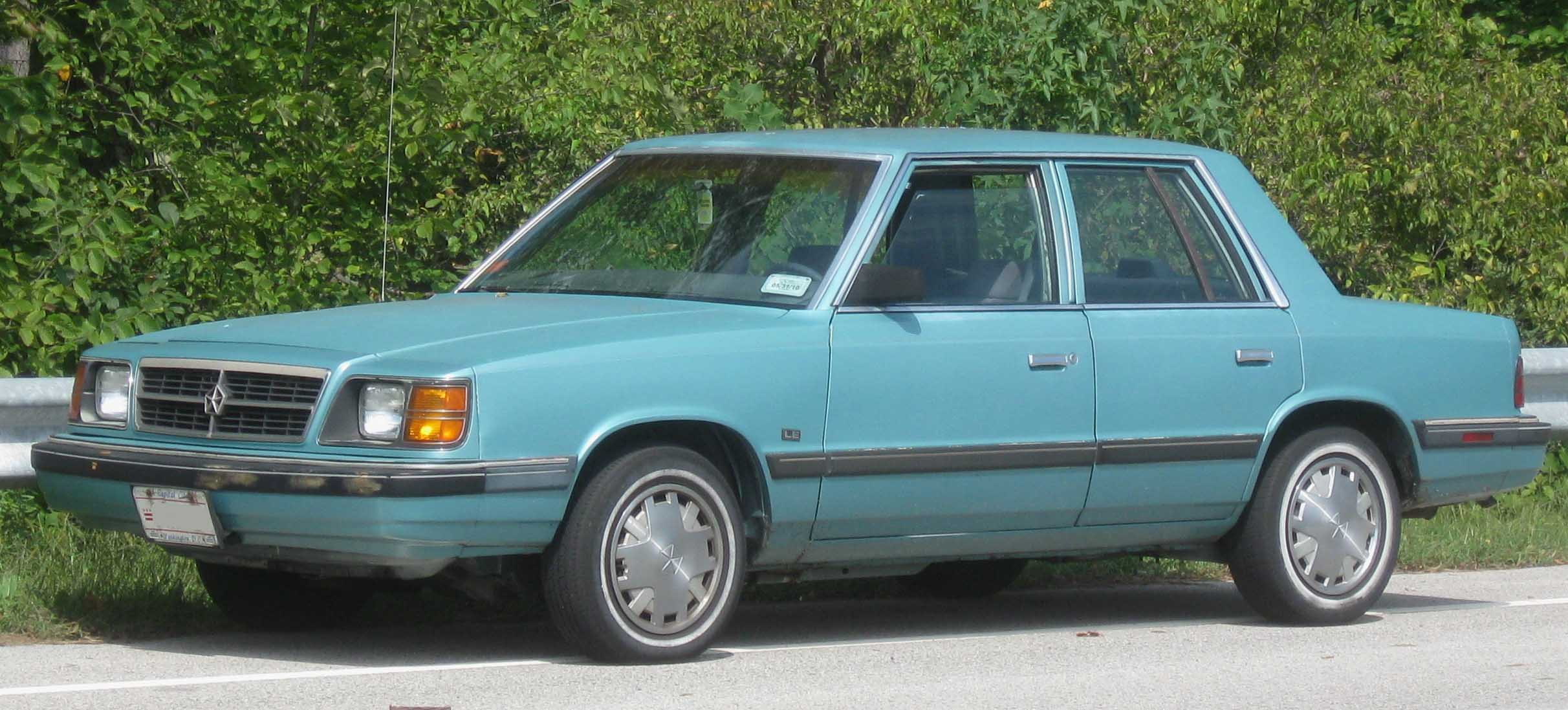
- 1989 Dodge Aries K Sedan

Overview
- Manufacturer: Chrysler Corporation
- Production: 1981–1995

Body and chassis
- Class: Compact car Mid-size car Full-size car Sports car Minivan
- Layout: FF layout
- Body styles: 2-door convertible 2-door coupe 4-door sedan 4-door station wagon 4-door limousine

Powertrain
- Engines: 2.2 L K I4; 2.2 L Turbo I I4; 2.2 L Turbo II I4; 2.2 L Turbo III I4; 2.2 L Turbo IV I4; 2.2 L TC I4; 2.5 L K I4; 2.5 L Turbo I4; 2.6 L Mitsubishi G54B I4; 3.0 L Mitsubishi 6G72 V6; 3.3 L EGA V6; 3.8 L EGH V6

Chronology
- Predecessor: L-body
- Successor: PL; JA; LH; NS

The K-car platform was a key automotive design platform introduced by Chrysler Corporation for the 1981 model year, featuring a transverse engine, front-wheel drive, independent front and semi-independent rear suspension configuration—a stark departure from the company's previous reliance on solid axle, rear-drive unibody configurations during the 1970s. Derived from Chrysler's L-cars, the Plymouth Horizon and Dodge Omni, the platform was developed just as the company faltered in the market, at first underpinning a modest range of compact/mid-size sedans and wagons—and eventually underpinning nearly fifty different models, including all-wheel drive variants—and playing a vital role in the company's subsequent resurgence.

== Common platforms ==
The use of a common platform is a widely used practice for reducing the number of parts and engineering time. Before creating the K platform, Chrysler was building vehicles on a small number of common platforms (e.g. F/L/J/M and R), but the different models shared few parts. In announcing his decision to develop the K platform, Chrysler CEO Lee Iacocca said the company's huge number of parts in inventory and the complexity of building many completely different versions of vehicles were reasons Chrysler was losing money. He directed the engineers to focus on making a larger number of common parts where they would not be visible to customers; this was already common practice in Japan and Germany and would help to make the K-cars profitable even at low prices.

Arriving on the brink of Chrysler's near-certain financial collapse, the new platform had a dramatic effect, helping Chrysler report a profit in October 1980 of $10 million ($39.1 million in 2025), its first profit in two years. A plethora of K-platform body styles and badge-engineered variants followed the original range, including the company's minivans and upscale Chrysler division models. The platform interchangeability saved production and purchasing costs, initially costing Chrysler $1 billion over three years to develop ($3.91 billion in 2025), but only costing $50 million ($195 million in 2025) to generate the second group of badge-engineered variants, the LeBaron and Dodge 400. Within two years, the K platform vehicles accounted for roughly half of Chrysler's operating profits.

In 1984, The New York Times said, "Not only did [K-cars] almost single-handedly save Chrysler from certain death, they also provided the company with a vehicle that could be stretched, smoothed, poked, chopped and trimmed to create almost a dozen different models."

In 1984, David Lewis, an auto industry historian and professor of business history at the University of Michigan said no platform "in the history of the automobile industry has so dramatically allowed a company to survive in such a substantial way. No company has been down so low, in such difficult straits, and then depended on practically a single product to bring it back."

We talk about all these cars being K car derivatives, which is correct, but that doesn't mean they all have to have K car characteristics. Through different selections of springs, shocks, tires, added sound insulation, improving rubber bushings, the character of the car can be changed quite dramatically. That has been the secret of being able to take a car of the K body compact class all the way up to the New Yorker luxury class.

— L. Donald Gschwind, Chrysler's VP for Program Management, in 1984

== Sales figures ==
Following the 1973 oil crisis, compounded by the 1979 energy crisis, American consumers began to buy fuel-efficient, low-cost automobiles built in Japan. With the market for large V-8 engined automobiles declining, American domestic auto manufacturers found themselves trying to develop compact vehicles that could compete with the Japanese imports of Toyota, Honda, and Nissan in price and finish. Chrysler Corporation's answer to the import pressure was the K platform, which featured an economical 4-cylinder engine, front-wheel drive and used many modern weight-reducing measures, such as replacing metal styling parts with plastic interior and exterior components.

The K-cars (Dodge Aries, Plymouth Reliant, Chrysler LeBaron, Dodge 400, and, in Mexico, Dodge Dart) sold over 2 million vehicles from 1981 to 1988, and around 100,000 in their final year, 1989.

The manual transmission provided acceleration of 0–60 mph (0–97 km/h) in 10 seconds, while the automatic was between 13 and 14 seconds, similar to or better than most competitors, while fuel economy was rated by the EPA at 26 mpg_{‑US} (9.0 L/100 km; 31 mpg_{‑imp}) city and 41 mpg_{‑US} (5.7 L/100 km; 49 mpg_{‑imp}) highway with the manual transmission. All had a 100.1-inch (2,540 mm) wheelbase. The overall length of the two- and four-door models was 176 inches (4,500 mm). The wagon was 0.2 inches (5.1 mm) longer. The vehicles had an approximate 14-US-gallon (53 L; 12 imp gal) fuel tank. The coupe and sedan had approximately 15 cubic feet (0.42 m^{3}) of luggage space; the wagons, 35 cubic feet (0.99 m^{3}) with the rear seat upright and about 70 cubic feet (2.0 m^{3}) when folded down.

Numerous improvements to the sound insulation and general feel were made for the model year 1983. In 1985, the Reliant, Aries, and LeBaron received a facelift, with a rounded front fascia, smoother hood, and bigger taillights. In 1986, the cars began using fuel injection on the 2.2-liter engine and a 2.5-liter engine replaced the arguably unreliable Mitsubishi 2.6-liter engine.

They were initially very profitable, and Iacocca credited them with allowing the company to pay off its bankruptcy loans early.

== Derivatives ==
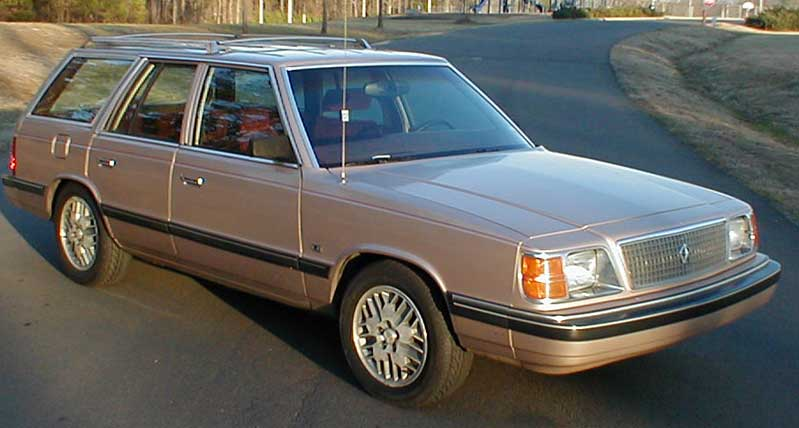
Plymouth Reliant station wagon

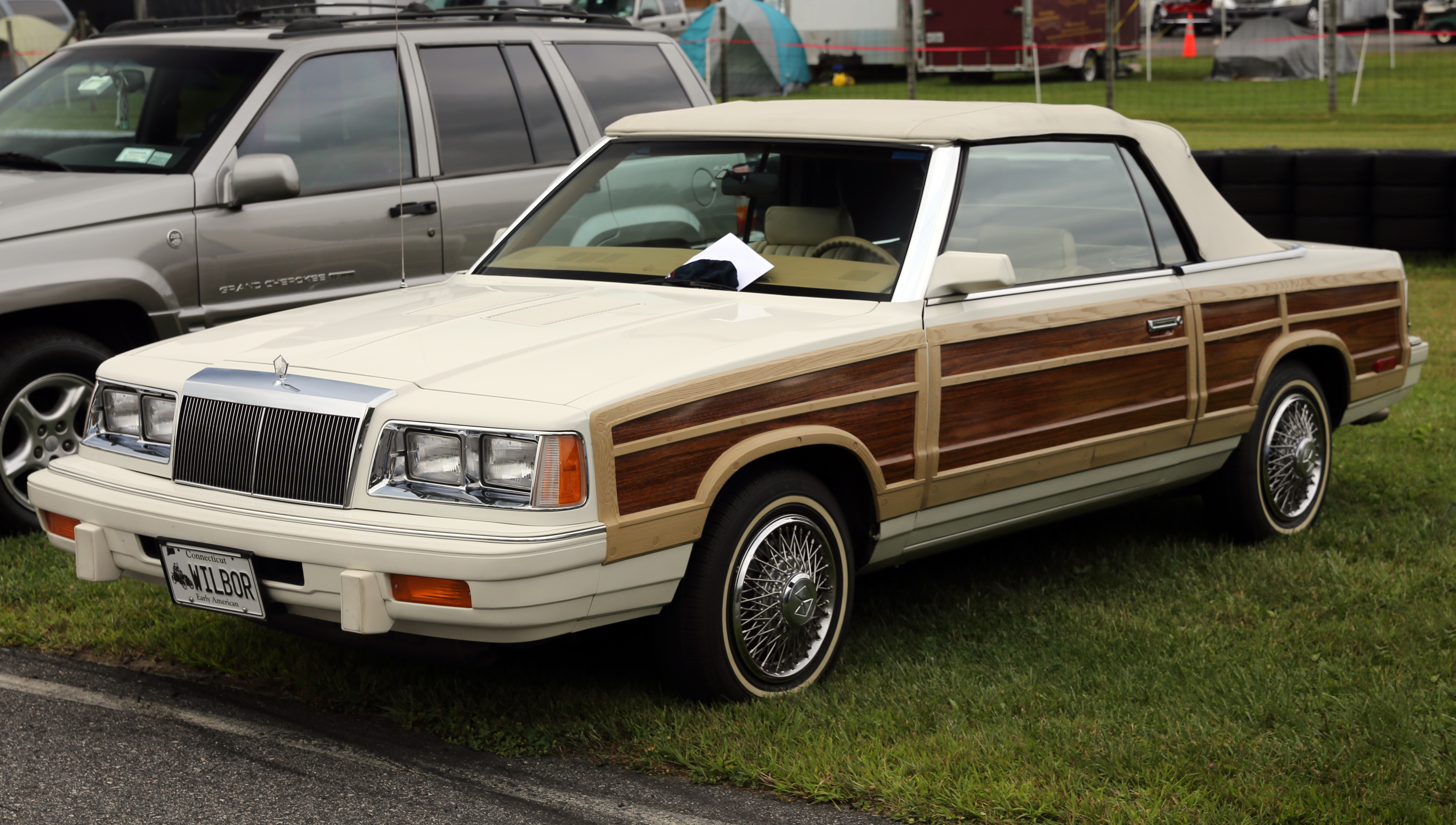
1986 Chrysler LeBaron Town & Country convertible

The K-derivatives offered a large variety of engines, depending on year and model. Four-cylinder engines were initially equipped with carburetors; fuel injection was phased in beginning in 1986. Engine output ranged from 86 hp (64 kW) to 224 hp (167 kW). Most vehicles had the 2.2 L or 2.5 L Chrysler four-cylinder engine; however, from 1981 to 1985, a 2.6 L four and from 1987 to 1995, a 3.0 L V6, both made by Mitsubishi were offered.

- K mid-size cars
  - 1981–1989 Dodge Aries (often referred to as the Aries K, owing to strong publicity for the K cars; 1981 models are badged as such.)
  - 1981–1989 Plymouth Reliant (as above, also known as the Reliant K)
  - 1982–1988 Chrysler LeBaron (coupes and convertibles were produced on this platform until 1986)
  - 1982–1988 Chrysler LeBaron Town and Country
  - 1982–1983 Dodge 400
  - 1982–1985 Dodge Dart K (Mexico only)
  - 1982–1985 Valiant Volare K (2-door) (Mexico only)
  - 1986–1988 Dart by Chrysler (2-door and wagon) (Mexico only)
  - 1986–1988 Volare by Chrysler (2-door) (Mexico only)
  - 1986–1987 Volare by Chrysler (4-door) (Mexico only)
  - 1983–1988 Plymouth Caravelle coupe (Canada only)
  - 1984–1986 Dodge 600 coupe and convertible
  - 1985-1987 Dodge Michigan (Japan only)
  - 1984–1987 Dodge Magnum 400 and Dodge Magnum Turbo (Mexico only)
  - 1985 Chrysler 600 Sedan (Mexico only)
- E (Extended-wheelbase) mid-size cars
  - 1983–1984 Chrysler E-Class
  - 1983–1986 Chrysler Executive limousine
  - 1983–1987 Chrysler New Yorker
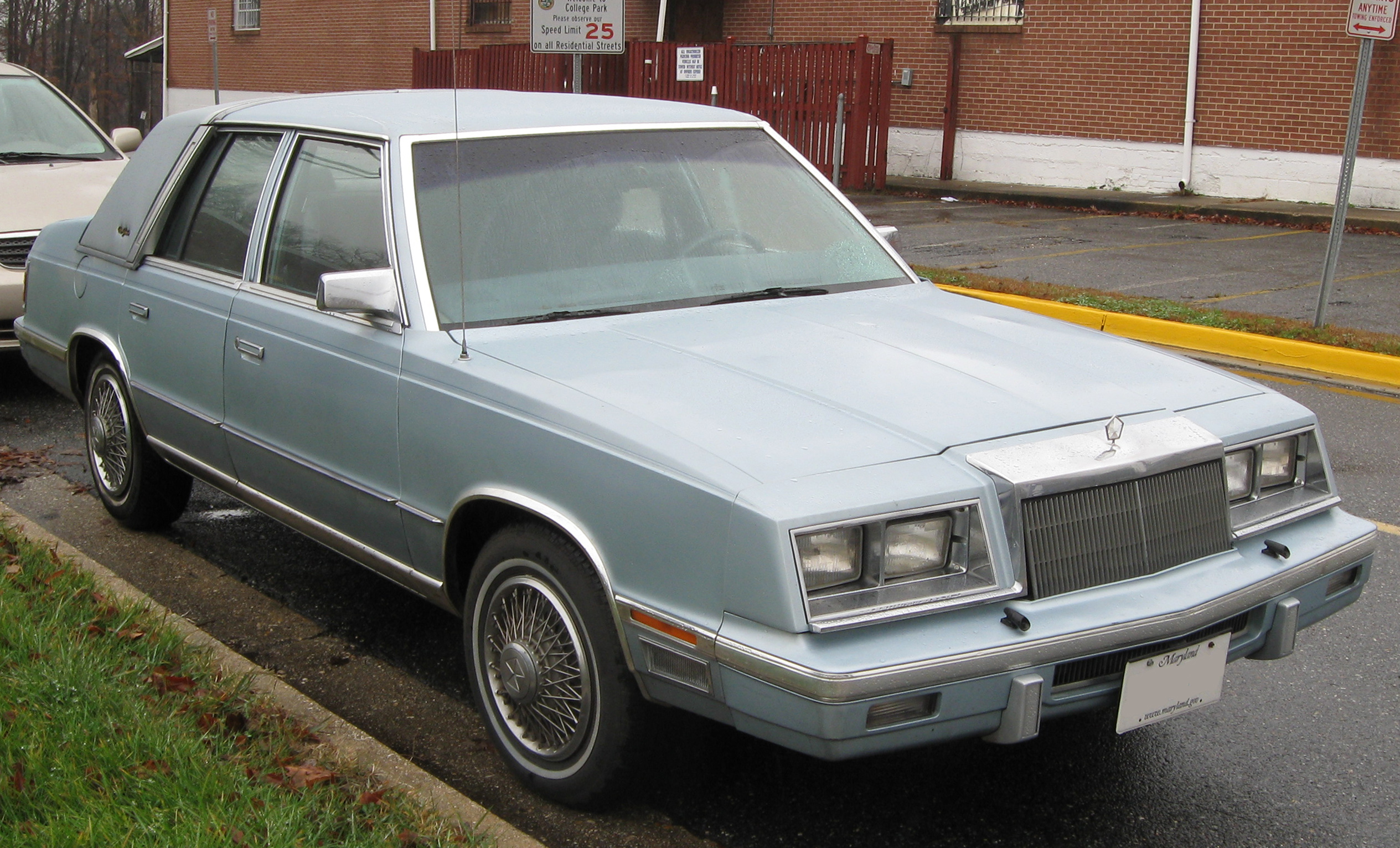
  - 1987 Chrysler New Yorker, an E Body
    1988 Chrysler New Yorker Turbo (For 1988, the non-turbo Chrysler New Yorker began using the larger C Platform (see below) but the Turbo did not)
  - 1983–1988 Dodge 600 sedan
  - 1985–1988 Plymouth Caravelle
  - 1986–1989 Dart by Chrysler (4-door) (Mexico only)
  - 1988–1989 Volare by Chrysler (4-door) (Mexico only)
- G sports cars (designated as the AG platform from 1989)
  - 1984–1986 Chrysler Laser
  - 1984–1993 Dodge Daytona and Chrysler Daytona (Canada)
- S minivans
  - 1984–1990 Dodge Caravan
  - 1984–1990 Plymouth Voyager
  - 1990 Chrysler Town and Country
- H mid-size cars
  - 1985–1988 Chrysler LeBaron GTS
  - 1985–1989 Dodge Lancer
  - 1987 Shelby Lancer
- P compact cars (designated as the AP platform from 1989)
  - 1987–1994 Dodge Shadow
  - 1987–1994 Plymouth Sundance and Duster
  - 1987–1989 Shelby CSX
- J sport cars (designated as the AJ platform from 1989)
  - 1987–1995 Chrysler LeBaron coupe and convertible
  - 1988–1994 Chrysler Phantom coupe only (Mexico only)
- C mid-size cars (designated as the AC platform from 1989)
  - 1988–1993 Chrysler New Yorker
  - 1988–1993 Dodge Dynasty
  - 1988–1993 Chrysler Dynasty (Canada only)
- AA mid-size cars
  - 1989–1994 Chrysler Saratoga (Europe only)
  - 1989–1995 Dodge Spirit
  - 1989–1995 Plymouth Acclaim
  - 1990–1994 Chrysler LeBaron sedan
  - 1990–1994 Chrysler New Yorker (Mexico only)
- Q sports car
  - 1989–1991 Chrysler TC by Maserati
- Y luxury cars (a stretched variant of the C platform used for two top-line models, also designated as the AY platform)
  - 1990–1993 Chrysler New Yorker Fifth Avenue
  - 1990–1993 Chrysler Imperial
- AS minivans
  - 1991–1995 Chrysler Town and Country
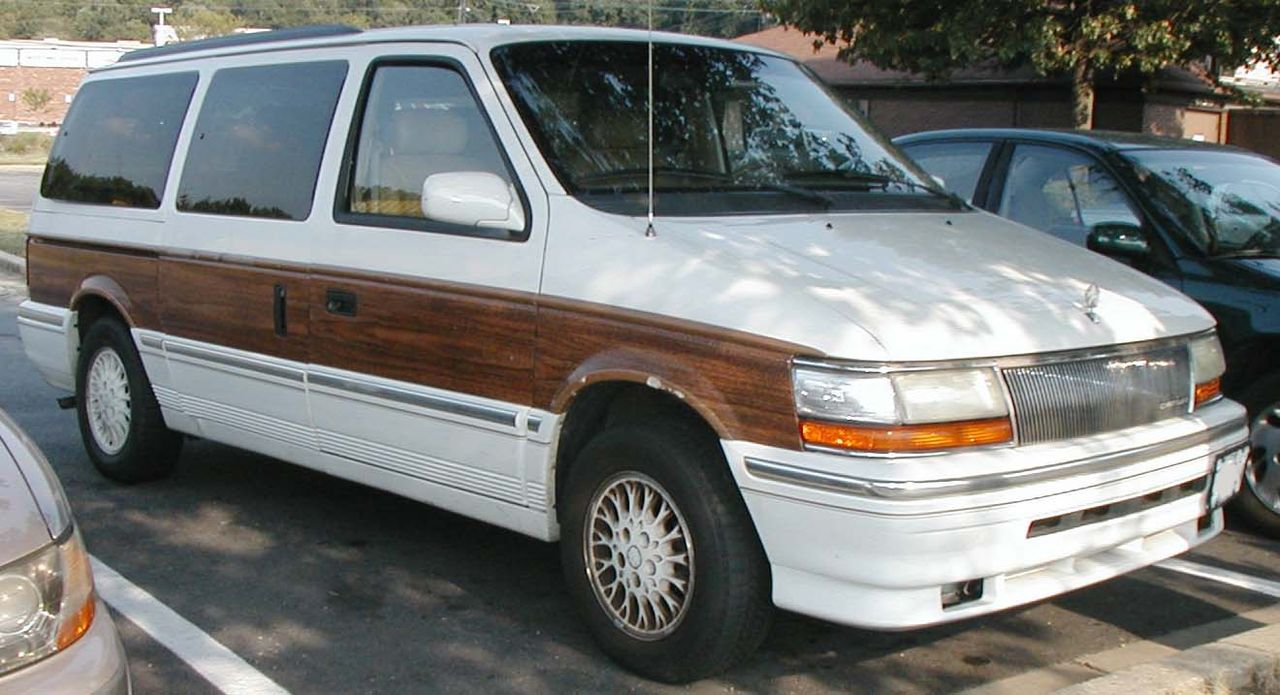
  - 1993 Chrysler Town & Country, an AS platform minivan
    1991–1995 Dodge Caravan
  - 1991–1995 Plymouth Voyager

== See also ==
- Metrication in the United States – First Chrysler car to be produced in the metric system with metric screw threads and components.
