= Chrysler 2.2 & 2.5 engine =

2.2 & 2.5 engine
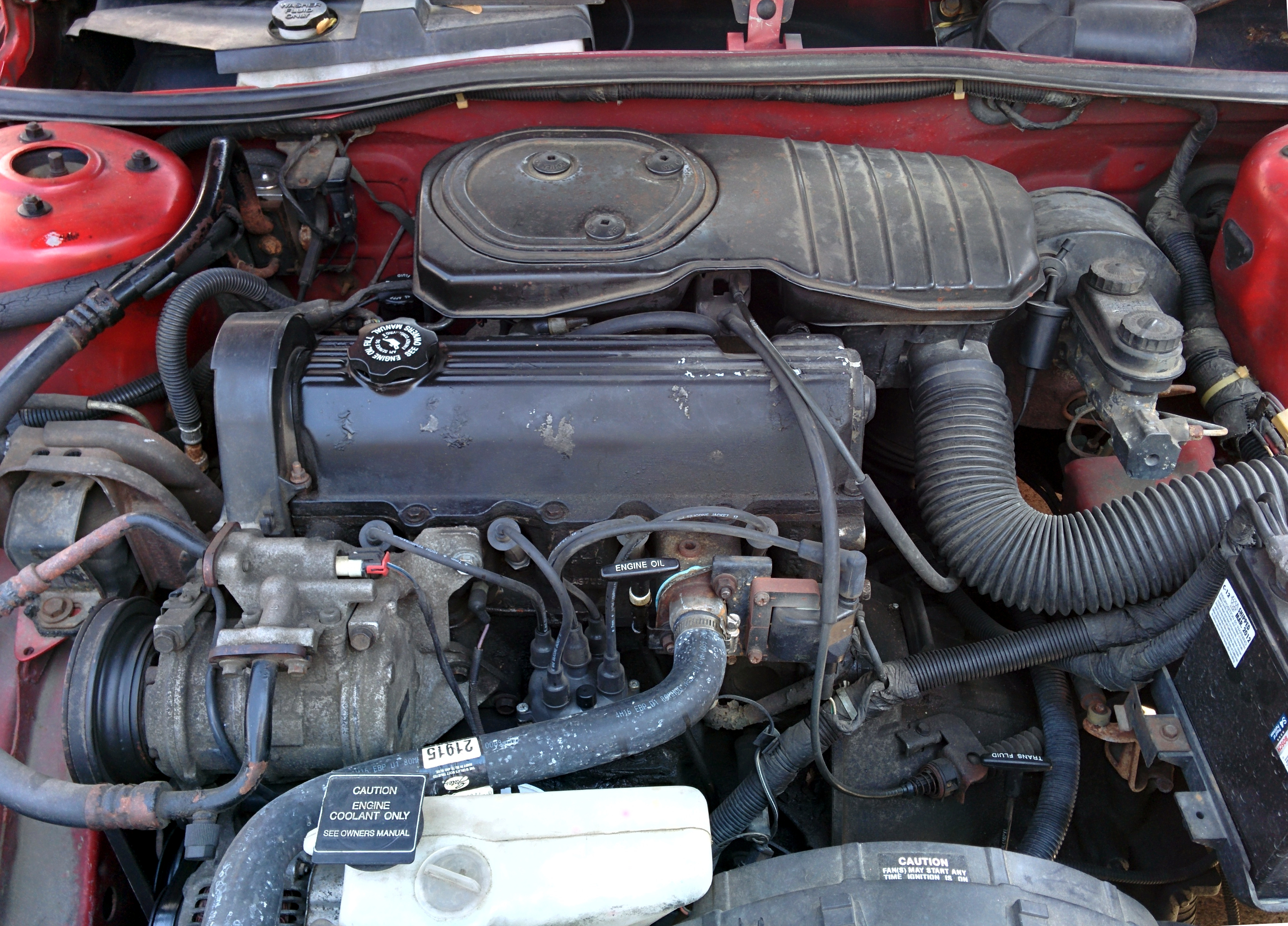
- A 2.2L TBI engine installed in a 1994 Plymouth Sundance

Overview
- Manufacturer: Chrysler (Trenton Engine Plant)
- Also called: Chrysler Trans Four
- Production: 1981–1995

Layout
- Configuration: inline-four
- Displacement: 2213 cc (135.0 cu in); 2501 cc (152.6 cu in)
- Cylinder bore: 87.5 mm (3.44 in)
- Piston stroke: 92 mm (3.62 in); 104 mm (4.09 in)
- Cylinder block material: Cast Iron
- Cylinder head material: Aluminum
- Valvetrain: Double overhead camshafts; Single overhead camshaft
- Compression ratio: 8.1:1; 8.5:1; 8.9:1; 9.0: 1; 9.5:1

Combustion
- Fuel system: Carburetor; Single-point fuel injection; Multi-point fuel injection
- Fuel type: Gasoline; Methanol
- Oil system: Wet sump
- Cooling system: Water-cooled

Chronology
- Successor: AMC straight-4 engine; Chrysler 1.8, 2.0 & 2.4 engine

The 2.2 and 2.5 (most commonly referred to as the "K engine," and also known as the Trenton Engine due to their manufacturing location), are a family of overhead cam inline-4 engines developed by Chrysler Corporation originally for the Chrysler K- and L-platforms cars and subsequently used in many other Chrysler vehicles. After its launch in 1981, it became the basis for all Chrysler-developed 4-cylinder engines until the Chrysler 1.8, 2.0 & 2.4 engine family (commonly referred to as the "Neon engine") was released in 1994. It was the first Chrysler-engineered four-cylinder engine since the Chrysler flathead four-cylinder was discontinued in 1933. The engine block and valvetrain were not derived from the overhead valve Chrysler LA series V8 that was in production then.

== 2.2 ==
The first version of this engine family was a normally aspirated 2.2 L (134 cu in) unit. Developed under the leadership of Chief Engineer – Engine Design and Development Willem Weertman and head of performance tuning Charles "Pete" Hagenbuch, who had worked on most of Chrysler's V-8 engines and the Chrysler Slant-6 engine, it was introduced in the 1981 Dodge Aries, Dodge Omni, Plymouth Horizon and Plymouth Reliant, and was produced until 2000.

The 2.2 has an undersquare 87.5 mm (3.44 in) bore and 92 mm (3.62 in) stroke, which gives it a displacement of 2,213 cc (135.0 cu in). It is a siamesed engine: there are no coolant passages between cylinders. The bore spacing is 96 mm (3.78 in), limiting the potential for increased bore diameter. All 2.2 engines have cast iron blocks, use a timing belt, and are non-interference engines. The earliest version used a two-barrel carburetor, but fuel injection was introduced in 1984 on both turbocharged and normally aspirated models (it is used on all 2.5 liter engines). Fuel injection was standard on some higher end models such as the Chrysler E-Class, Laser, and New Yorker, and the Dodge 600 and Daytona. In 1985 fuel injection became optional on the lower end models (Dodge Omni/Plymouth Horizon, Dodge Aries/Plymouth Reliant), eventually replacing the carbureted variant across the board.

The initial carbureted 2.2 initially produced 84 horsepower (63 kW), but the output was increased to 96 horsepower (72 kW) and 119 lb⋅ft (161 N⋅m). Later versions were fuel-injected and produced 93 horsepower (69 kW) to 99 horsepower (74 kW) and 122 lb⋅ft (165 N⋅m), and a High-Output version for the Dodge Charger produced 110 horsepower (82 kW) and 129 lb⋅ft (175 N⋅m).

Four series of turbocharged 2.2 and 2.5 liter engines were produced, normally referred to as Turbo I, Turbo II, Turbo III, and Turbo IV. The primary difference between these engines was the use of an intercooler (in all except Turbo I). The Turbo III, ironically developed after the Turbo IV, was coupled to high-performance, four-valve-per-cylinder head developed in cooperation with Lotus, bringing 224 horsepower (167 kW) from the 2.2 liter engine. The Turbo IV pioneered the use of variable nozzle technology to minimize lag.

The 2.2 was made at Chrysler's Trenton Engine plant in Trenton, Michigan. In 1995 Chrysler sold much of the machining equipment as well as the license to the design, to First Auto Works of China, after negotiations which had begun in the mid-eighties. The Trenton plant largely switched to the new Chrysler 3.3 engine production, while FAW continues to build the 2.2, which they used in their version of the Audi 100. In 1982, Chrysler also signed an agreement with Perkins Engines to build a dieselized version of the 2.2 (and of the 3.7-liter inline-six) in Windsor, Ontario. Design work on the six had started in 1975, with the 2.2 added to the program in 1980, but due to labor unrest in Canadian automobile manufacture and the collapse of the diesel market in North America, Lee Iacocca suddenly and unilaterally cancelled these plans in 1983.

Vehicles using the 2.2 engine
- 1983–1984 Chrysler E-Class
- 1983–1986 Chrysler Executive
- 1984–1986 Chrysler Laser
- 1982–1990 Chrysler LeBaron (fuel-injected after 1985)
- 1985–1988 Chrysler LeBaron GTS
- 1981–1982 Dodge 024
- 1982–1983 Dodge 400
- 1983–1988 Dodge 600 (fuel-injected after 1984)
- 1981–1989 Dodge Aries (fuel-injected after 1985)
- 1984–1987 Dodge Caravan
- 1983–1987 Dodge Charger
- 1987–1988 Dodge Dakota
- 1984–1990 Dodge Daytona
- 1981–1990 Dodge Omni (fuel-injected after 1987)
- 1985–1989 Dodge Lancer
- 1982–1984 Dodge Rampage
- 1987–1994 Dodge Shadow
- Hongqi CA 1021U3, CA5020XJB police car, CA7202, CA7220A9E, CA7220A9E parade car, CA7220A9EL1/L2 cabrio-coach/L2 parade car, CA7220A9EL2A2 parade car, CA7220EL1, CA7226L
- 1985–1988 Plymouth Caravelle
- 1981–1990 Plymouth Horizon (fuel-injected after 1987)
- 1981–1989 Plymouth Reliant (fuel-injected after 1985)
- 1983 Plymouth Scamp (Dodge Rampage twin)
- 1987–1994 Plymouth Sundance
- 1981–1982 Plymouth TC3
- 1983–1987 Plymouth Turismo
- 1984–1987 Plymouth Voyager

=== High Output ===
The 1983 and 1984 Dodge Shelby Charger was more of a handling package, but the regular 2.2 L engine was modified somewhat. This High Output 2.2 used a revised camshaft to boost output to 110 horsepower (82 kW) and 129 lb⋅ft (175 N⋅m), and the block was decked to increase the compression ratio. These modifications allowed the Shelby Charger to hit 50 miles per hour (80.5 km/h) in 5.5 seconds and cover the quarter mile (402 m) in under 16 seconds. The 1985 Dodge Charger Shelby used the 2.2 Turbo I engine instead, so this high output 2.2 was made an option on regular Dodge Chargers that year.

Applications of the High Output 2.2L included the 1983–1984 Dodge Shelby Charger, the 1985 Plymouth Turismo (L-body), the 1984-1985 Dodge Omni GLH and the 1985–1987 Dodge Charger. This High Output version of the 2.2L could be easily recognized by its chrome valve cover and tighter timing cover.

=== Turbo I ===
Chrysler's first turbocharged engine was the 1984 Turbo I. It used a Garrett T03 turbocharger with a mechanical wastegate to limit boost to 7.2 pounds per square inch (50 kPa), and was rated at 142 horsepower (106 kW) and 160 lb⋅ft (217 N⋅m), a substantial increase in power over the standard 2.2 engines. Changes included a lower compression ratio, special pistons, high-strength valves, higher-pressure springs (to avoid float), better-sealing rings, a special cam, select-fit bearings, a special exhaust manifold, and a diecast aluminum cylinder head cover.

For 1985, a computer-controlled wastegate was substituted which, with the use of a knock sensor, allowed 9 pounds per square inch (62 kPa) of temporary overboost. Output was rated at 146 horsepower (109 kW) and 168 lb⋅ft (228 N⋅m). A Mitsubishi TE04H turbo and new intake manifold were used for 1988.

Vehicles using the 2.2T1 engine
- 1984 Chrysler E-Class
- 1984–1986 Chrysler Executive
- 1984–1986 Chrysler Laser
- 1984–1988 Chrysler LeBaron
- 1985–1988 Chrysler LeBaron GTS
- 1984–1987 Chrysler New Yorker
- 1988 Chrysler New Yorker Turbo
- 1984–1988 Dodge 600
- 1985–1988 Dodge Lancer
- 1984–1986 Dodge Omni GLH
- 1985–1988 Plymouth Caravelle
- 1985–1987 Dodge Charger Shelby
- 1988 Shelby CSX-T
- 1984–1986 Dodge Daytona Turbo
- 1987 Dodge Daytona Shelby Z with Automatics

=== Turbo II ===
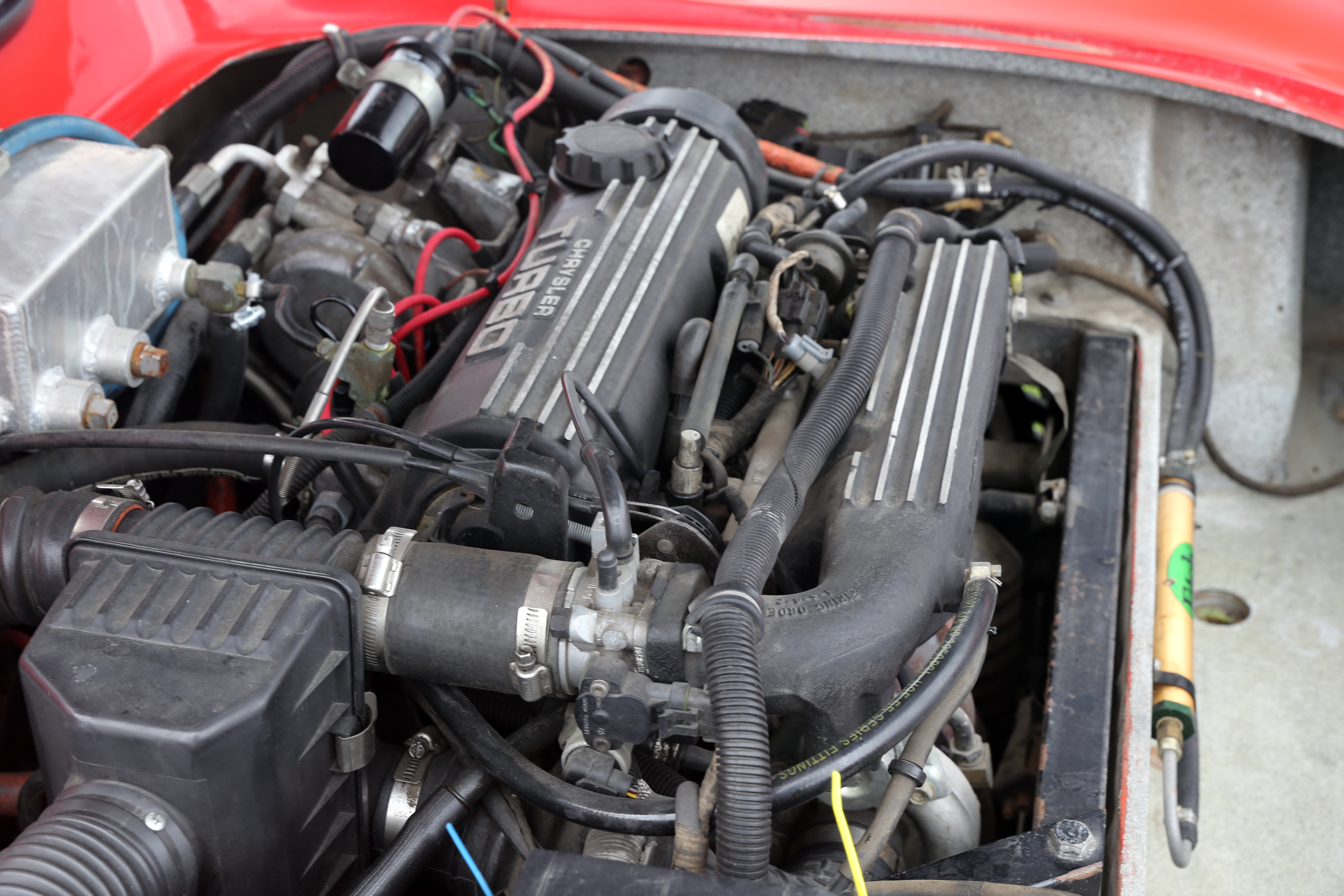
A Turbo II engine in a 1990 Consulier GTP

The Turbo II designation was applied to a turbocharged, intercooled version of the 2.2. This Turbo II designation was first used in the 1986 Shelby GLH-S and the 1987 Shelby Charger GLH-S. Shelby Automobiles modified a stock Turbo I engine by swapping several pre-production pieces from the Turbo II inline-four engine. These changes included an intercooler and other changes to produce 175 hp (130 kW) and a flat 175 ft·lbf (237 N·m) torque curve. Not included were any of the durability changes to the short block (forged crank, full floating pin, stouter connecting rods, etc.) of the 1987 Chrysler Turbo II engine that was produced by the factory the following year. Shelby installed the factory produced Turbo II in his Shelby Lancer and Shelby CSX. Chrysler's strengthened version of this engine, with a forged crankshaft and connecting rods, was used in the Shelby Z package of the 1987–1989 Dodge Daytona and other cars. Output of the production Turbo II was 175 hp (130 kW) and 200 lb⋅ft (271 N⋅m) with 12 pounds per square inch (83 kPa) of boost when mated to the stronger A520 5-speed manual transaxle.

A similar, one-piece version of the special two-piece intake manifold used on the Turbo II, minus the air charge temperature sensor, was added to the Turbo I for 1988. The next year, the new common block was introduced; it was used for all subsequent versions of the 2.2 and 2.5, including the 2.2 L Turbo II, which then continued unchanged through 1990.

Vehicles using the 2.2T2 engine
- 1986 Shelby GLH-S (Omni)
- 1987 Shelby Charger Turbo
- 1987 Shelby GLHS (Charger)
- 1985–1993 Consulier GTP
- 1987–1989 Dodge Daytona Shelby Z
- 1987–1988 Shelby CSX
- 1987 Shelby Lancer
- 1988–1989 Dodge Lancer Shelby
- 1988–1989 Chrysler LeBaron GTS hatchback
- 1987–1989 Chrysler LeBaron coupe / convertible GTC
- 1989 Dodge Daytona C/S

=== Turbo III ===
The Turbo III used a Lotus-made DOHC 16-valve head. Output was 224 horsepower (167 kW) and 217 lb⋅ft (294 N⋅m). This engine was used in 1,399 Dodge Spirit R/T and several hundred Dodge and Chrysler Daytona IROC R/T models in the US, Canada, and Europe, plus models including the Chrysler Spirit R/T and Phantom R/T in Mexico.

Cars using the 2.2T3 engine include:

- 1991–1992 Dodge Spirit R/T (North America)
- 1991–1994 Chrysler Spirit R/T (Mexico)
- 1992–1993 Dodge Daytona IROC R/T (North America, Europe)
- 1992–1993 Chrysler Phantom R/T (Mexico)
- 1991–1993 Consulier GTP (USA)

=== Turbo IV ===
The Turbo IV was a turbocharged SOHC intercooled version with variable nozzle turbo (VNT) technology. This system reduced turbo lag. Used in the 1989 Shelby CSX, then regular production 1990 Dodge Shadows, Daytonas, and Chrysler LeBarons. Production on this engine was limited to around 1250 units..

Vehicles using the 2.2T4 engine
- 1989 Shelby CSX (500 built-498 to the public)
- 1990 Dodge Shadow ES (141 built)
- 1990 Dodge Shadow Competition (27 built)
- 1990 Dodge Daytona Shelby (536 built)
- 1990 Dodge Daytona C/S Competition (21 built)
- 1990 Chrysler LeBaron GTC (255 built, 123 coupes 132 convertibles)

=== TC ===
The Chrysler TC, developed with Maserati, used a special turbocharged 2.2 engine. This version was related to the Turbo II but used a special 16-valve head — not the same as that used in the Turbo III — pistons, connecting rods, intake manifold, crankshaft and other components. No parts are interchangeable with other versions of the engine.

The 2.2 TC engine was an international effort: The cylinder head was cast in England by Cosworth and finished in Italy by Maserati using a cam over bucket design. The pistons are forged and came from Mahle in Germany, and a Japanese turbocharger was sourced from IHI. The camshafts were designed by Florida-based Crane but were constructed by Maserati in Modena. The rods are forged Casar units and use a unique rod bearing size. The crankshaft is also forged and weighs 53 pounds. Only 501 Chrysler TCs were produced with the DOHC 16-valve head. This engine shares essentially only the front and rear main seals, oil pan seal, intermediate shaft and bearings, main bearings (only, rod bearings are unique), and distributor with any other Chrysler 2.2/2.5. This head was also used in IMSA racing, but not in turbocharged form.

== 2.5 ==
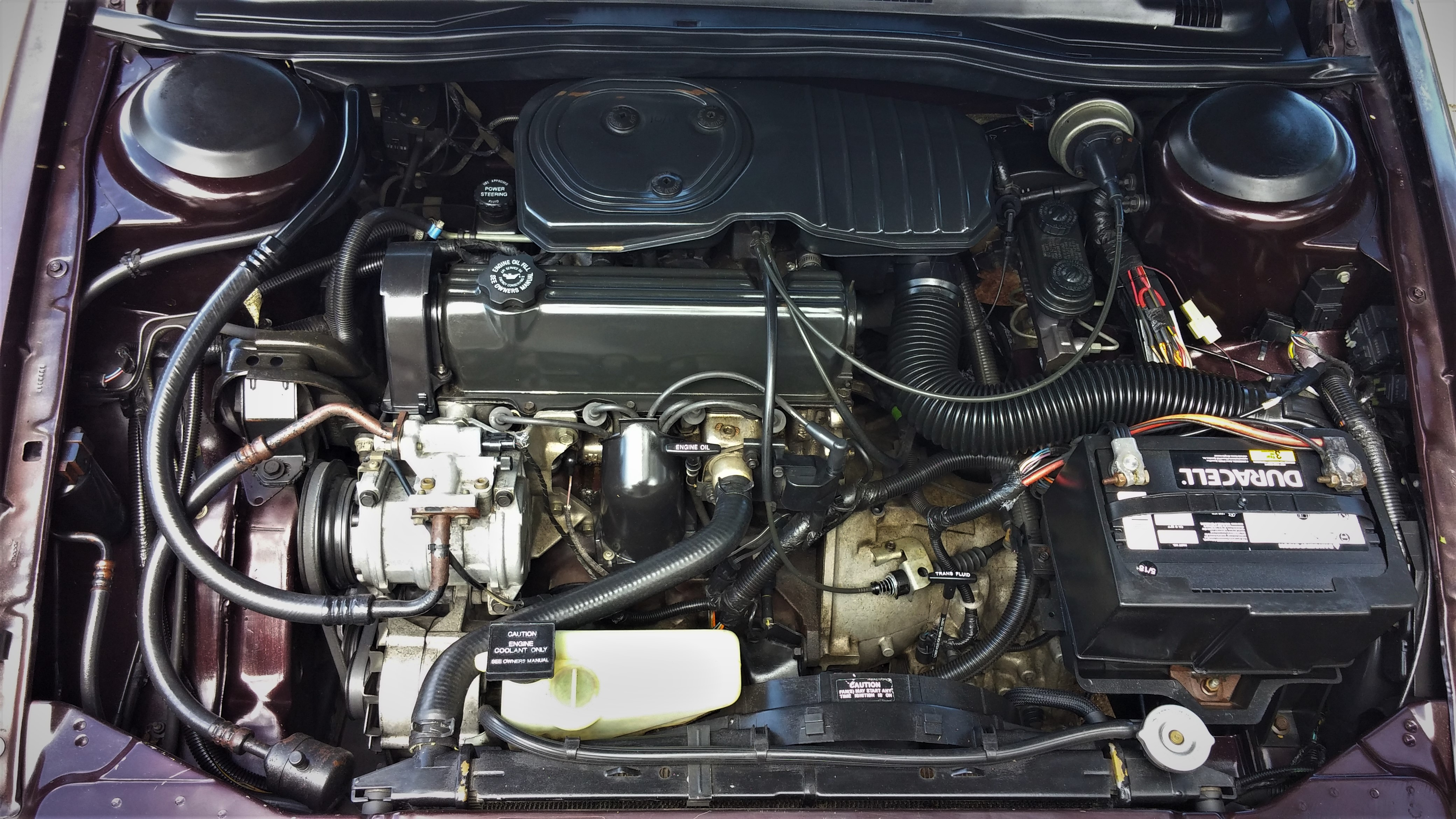
A 2.5L TBI engine installed in a 1991 Dodge Spirit

In 1986, Chrysler increased the displacement of the engine to 2.5 L (153 cu in) and added counterrotating balance shafts to smooth out the vibrations and harsh harmonics normally produced by long-stroke 4-cylinder engines. The increased displacement came from a raised deck and longer 104 millimetres (4.09 in) stroke, making the 2.5 engine even more undersquare and tuned for low-end torque rather than high-RPM power. This engine replaced the Mitsubishi 2.6 engine Chrysler had been using. In normally aspirated form, the 2.5 produced 100 horsepower (75 kW) and 136 lb⋅ft (184 N⋅m). In 1989 there was a redesign of the 2.5 to permit both it and the 2.2 to use a common cylinder block. The crankshaft, connecting rods and pistons are completely different in the common-block 2.5 compared to the previous 2.5. This engine competed with Ford Motor Company's HSC engine, which was increased from 2.3 L to 2.5 L for use in the 1986 to 1991 Taurus. The Chrysler 2.5 was retired in 1995.

Vehicles using the normally aspirated 2.5 engine
- 1986–1993 Chrysler LeBaron
- 1986–1987 Chrysler New Yorker
- 1986–1988 Dodge 600
- 1986–1989 Dodge Aries
- 1987½–1995 Dodge Caravan
- 1989–1995 Dodge Dakota
- 1986–1993 Dodge Daytona
- 1988–1993 Dodge Dynasty
- 1986–1989 Dodge Lancer
- 1987–1994 Dodge Shadow
- 1989–1995 Dodge Spirit
- 1989–1995 Plymouth Acclaim
- 1986–1988 Plymouth Caravelle
- 1986–1989 Plymouth Reliant
- 1987–1994 Plymouth Sundance
- 1987½–1995 Plymouth Voyager

=== Turbo I ===
The 2.5 engine was offered in a Turbo I form starting in 1989. This engine had multipoint fuel injection and was rated at 150 hp (111.9 kW) and 180 lb⋅ft (244 N⋅m). In some models the 2.5 Turbo I was available in a "High Torque" version, which put out 152 hp (113 kW) and 210 lb⋅ft (285 N⋅m) by allowing higher boost pressures at low rpms.

Vehicles using the 2.5T1 engine
- 1989–1992 Chrysler LeBaron
- 1989–1990 Dodge Caravan
- 1989–1992 Dodge Daytona
- 1989–1992 Dodge Shadow
- 1989–1992 Dodge Spirit
- 1989–1992 Plymouth Acclaim
- 1989–1991 Plymouth Sundance
- 1989–1990 Plymouth Voyager
- 1989-Dodge Lancer Shelby (Automatic only)

=== Turbo II ===
In the Mexican market, a 2.5 Turbo II engine with intercooler and intake charge temperature sensing was available, rated at 168 hp (125 kW) and 175 lb⋅ft (237 N⋅m) to 188 lb⋅ft (255 N⋅m).

=== Carbureted ===
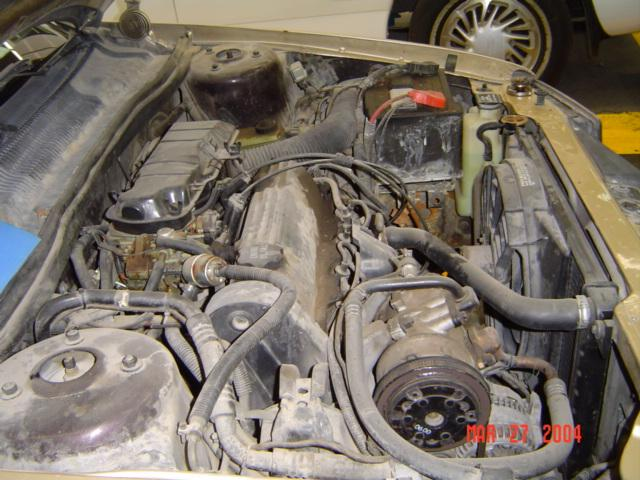
Carbureted 2.5 L engine installed in 1990 Mexican Chrysler Spirit

In the Mexican market, 1986 through 1990 vehicles used versions of the 2.2 and 2.5 engines operating on leaded gasoline, equipped with a carburetor, a tubular exhaust header, and electronic control of ignition timing. This induction and ignition system used technology and components very similar to those employed in Chrysler's US-market Lean Burn emission control systems of the late 1970s. This configuration was discontinued in favour of electronic fuel injection for the 1991 model year, when exhaust emission regulations took force in Mexico.

=== FFV ===
From 1993 to 1995, a 107 horsepower (80 kW) multipoint fuel injected non-turbo version of the 2.5 engine was installed in flexible-fuel Dodge Spirits and Plymouth Acclaims. This engine and its fuel supply and computerized management system were specially modified to run on fuel containing up to 85% Methanol. Most of the MPFI system was common with the Mexican-market 2.5 MPFI engine. Modifications included upgraded seal and gasket materials, chrome piston rings, stainless-steel fuel system components, sion fuel injectors internally plated with nickel, and fuel composition sensors.

== MPFI ==
From 1991 to 1995 in the Mexican market, multipoint fuel injected, non-turbo version of the 2.2 and 2.5 were installed in many Chrysler Corporation vehicles. This version of the 2.5 was rated at 113 horsepower (84 kW), and in most cases lacked the balance shafts used in all other versions of the 2.5. The MPFI system gave better driveability, performance and fuel economy, and cleaner emissions, but was nevertheless not used elsewhere than the Mexican domestic market and Chrysler de Mexico's export markets.

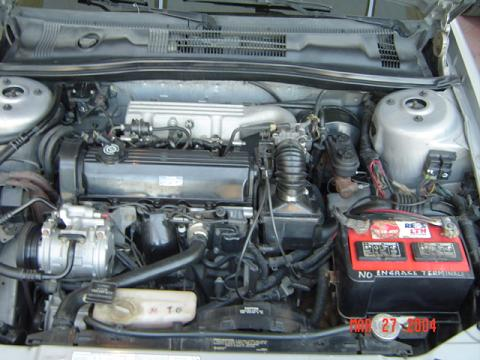
MPFI 2.5 L MPFI engine installed in 1994 Mexican Chrysler Spirit

== Engine computers ==
Various kinds of Engine Control Units were used with the 2.2 and 2.5 engines. From 1984 to 1987, the ECU was divided into the Logic Module (LM), which was inside the passenger cabin, and the Power Module located near the battery on the left front fender. The LM used a Motorola 6803U4 processor operating at 1 MHz, with 256 bytes of RAM and either two 8K EPROMs or one 16K EPROM. From 1988 to 1989, a SMEC (Single Module Engine Controller) was used. This was a complete redesign of the older system, using modern CAD for board design, and higher density SMD components. The processor was a 68HC11 operating at 2 MHz with 256 bytes of RAM and a 32K EPROM. Functionally, the SMEC was the combination of the earlier Logic and Power modules into one unit. Starting in 1990, a more advanced SBEC (Single Board Engine Controller) was used, which integrated the earlier two board computer into a single board.

== See also ==
- List of Chrysler engines
