= Dodge Shadow =

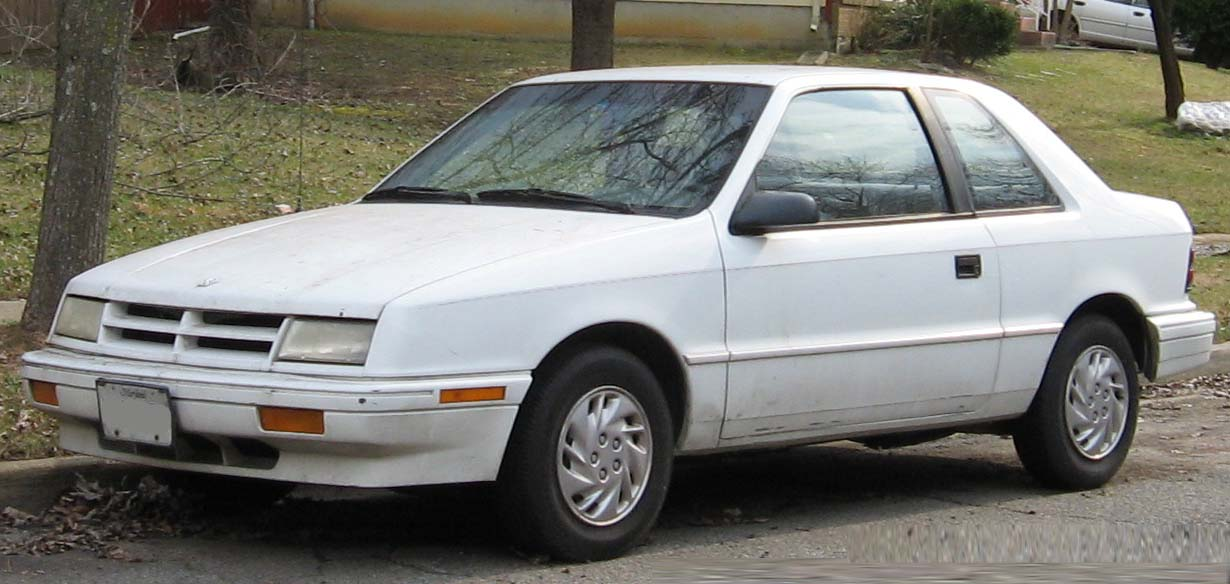

Overview
- Manufacturer: Chrysler Corporation
- Also called: Plymouth Sundance; Chrysler Shadow; Chrysler ES
- Production: August 1986 – March 1994
- Model years: 1987–1994
- Assembly: United States: Sterling Heights, Michigan (Sterling Heights Assembly); Mexico: Toluca, Mexico State (Toluca Car Assembly)

Body and chassis
- Class: Compact/C-segment
- Body style: 2-door convertible (Shadow only); 3/5-door hatchback
- Layout: Transverse front-engine, front-wheel drive
- Platform: Chrysler P platform
- Related: Shelby CSX

Powertrain
- Engine: 2.2 L K I4; 2.2 L Turbo I turbo I4; 2.2 L Turbo IV turbo I4; 2.5 L K I4; 2.5 L Turbo I turbo I4; 3.0 L 6G72 V6
- Transmission: 3-speed A413 automatic; 4-speed A604 automatic; 5-speed manual

Dimensions
- Wheelbase: 97.0 in (2,464 mm) (1987-1992); 97.2 in (2,469 mm) (1993-1994)
- Length: 171.9 in (4,366 mm) (1987-1989); 171.7 in (4,361 mm) (1990-1992); 171.9 in (4,366 mm) (1993-1994)
- Width: 67.3 in (1,709 mm)
- Height: 52.7 in (1,339 mm) (1987–1989); 52.6 in (1,336 mm) (1990); 52.7 in (1,339 mm) (1991–1993); 53.1 in (1,349 mm) (1994)
- Curb weight: 2,608 lb (1,183 kg) (3-door); 2,643 lb (1,199 kg) (5-door)

Chronology
- Predecessor: Dodge Omni / Plymouth Horizon; Dodge Charger
- Successor: Dodge / Plymouth Neon

The Dodge Shadow and Plymouth Sundance are compact 3-door and 5-door hatchbacks that were introduced for the 1987 model year by the Chrysler Corporation. For 1991, a 2-door convertible variant was added to the Shadow lineup; this bodystyle was not offered by Plymouth. The Sundance/Shadow replaced the Omni/Horizon models of their respective marque.

The first vehicle rolled out of Sterling Heights Assembly on August 25, 1986. In late 1988, production of the Mexican market version called the Chrysler Shadow began at Toluca Car Assembly. The Shadow/Sundance was also sold in Europe from 1988 to 1991 as the Chrysler ES. Production ended on March 9, 1994, with the Shadow/Sundance being replaced by the Dodge / Plymouth Neon.

== Design ==
The Shadow/Sundance employed a variant of the K-car platform, the P-body, which was based on a combination of the Dodge Daytona's suspension (alongside some of its interior styling cues) with a shortened version of the Dodge Lancer's body. It had originally been intended as a direct replacement for the earlier Dodge Omni/Plymouth Horizon, but with the economy segment becoming more crowded after the recent introductions of Hyundai (and Yugo) to the US market, Chrysler chose to make the car a bit more substantial. The P platform, being a cut down version of the regular K platform, was also a bit heavier than the competition. The lineup also had more equipment across the board than expected for the class, at least until the 1991 introduction of the stripped-down America model.

While they appeared to have a trunk, it was actually a hatchback. Chrysler considered this a special feature and advertising literature referred to it as "hidden hatchback versatility"; the relatively large storage capacity of these vehicles was a major selling point for the company. The Peugeot 309 which had been developed to replace the European Chrysler Horizon used a similar layout. While mechanically identical, the Sundance and Shadow were differentiated by their front grille, which featured brand consistent designs, Dodge using a crosshair design and Plymouth an "egg crate" design. They also had different tail lamps. In its final year, the Shadow featured the new Dodge ram's head emblem on the hood, replacing the corporate pentastar.

In the original lineup, the three-door only Shadow ES was the sportiest model, only available with the turbocharged engine and with wider rims and tires than other models.

=== Engines ===
Upon launch, the Shadow/Sundance was offered with a variety of four-cylinder engines, all with displacements of either 2.2 or 2.5 L, some were turbocharged. Naturally aspirated versions were fuel injected, except those sold in Mexico which were carbureted. The engines were tuned for torque rather than horsepower, resulting in horsepower and torque numbers that appear to be reversed from competitors such as the Honda Civic. A Mitsubishi-built 3.0 L V6 engine was added later, replacing the turbocharged engines. All engines were available with a 5-speed manual transmission, while a 3-speed automatic was optional on the four cylinder equipped cars and a 4-speed automatic transmission was optional on the V6-powered cars.

1987–94 Shadow/Sundance engines
Years	Engine	Power	Torque	Notes
1987–94	2.2 L K I4	97 hp (72 kW); 93 hp (69 kW)	122 lb⋅ft (165 N⋅m)	early late
1987–88	2.2 L Turbo I I4	146 hp (109 kW)	170 lb⋅ft (230 N⋅m)	
1988–94	2.5 L K I4	100 hp (75 kW)	135 lb⋅ft (183 N⋅m)	
1989–92	2.5 L Turbo I I4	150 hp (112 kW)	190 lb⋅ft (258 N⋅m)	Shadow
1989–91	2.5 L Turbo I I4	150 hp (112 kW)	190 lb⋅ft (258 N⋅m)	Sundance
1990	2.2 L Turbo IV I4	175 hp (130 kW)	205 lb⋅ft (278 N⋅m)	Shadow
1992–94	3.0 L 6G72 V6	141 hp (105 kW)	171 lb⋅ft (232 N⋅m)	

=== Safety ===
A motorized passenger-side seat belt was added to US-market Shadows/Sundances in 1994, to comply with Federal Motor Vehicle Safety Standard 208's requirement for passive restraints. These motorized seat belts did not comply with Canada's safety standards; Canadian-market Shadows/Sundances continued to use a manual passenger seatbelt, and 1994 Shadows/Sundances could not legally be imported across the US-Canada border in either direction until they reached the requisite age.

At the time, the Shadow/Sundance was the lowest-priced car on the market with a standard driver-side airbag (optional on Canadian-market models), which had been made standard on all US-market domestic Chrysler Corporation cars in 1990, giving them a remarkable crash test rating for a car its size at the time.

1991-1993 Shadow/Sundance NHTSA scores
Year	Frontal Driver	Frontal Passenger
1991	4/5 stars	5/5 stars
1992	4/5 stars	5/5 stars
1993	4/5 stars	5/5 stars

=== Production ===
Dodge Shadow Production Figures
	3-door	5-door	Convertible	Yearly Total
1987	38,497	37,559	-	76,056
1988	36,452	55,857	-	92,309
1989	31,508	46,183	-	77,691
1990	27,232	44,390	-	71,622
1991	28,756	33,839	20,043	82,638
1992	38,882	37,402	3,185	79,469
1993	50,218	45,883	6,313	102,414
1994	41,000	47,929	-	88,929
Total	292,545	349,042	29,541	671,128

== Year to year changes ==
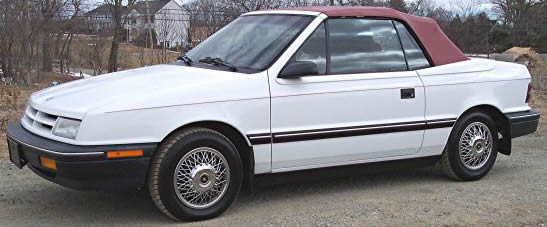
1991 Dodge Shadow convertible

- 1989 – The Shadow/Sundance received a facelift, with the sealed-beam headlamps discarded in favor of more aerodynamic composite units. All-new grilles and tail lights were among the changes as well.
- 1990 – A driver's side airbag was now standard on all models (optional on Canadian-market models) and the manual transmission was modified to make shifting into reverse easier by moving from the "left of first" position to the " below fifth gear" position.
- 1991 – A convertible version of the Shadow debuted, the same year the hatchback "base" submodel was split into the entry-level "America" or S (S was used on Canadian market versions) version and mid-level Highline submodels.
- 1992 – A Mitsubishi-built 3.0 L V6 was added to the lineup, replacing the turbocharged engines.
- 1993 – A low pressure Bendix-4 ABS was available.

== Options ==
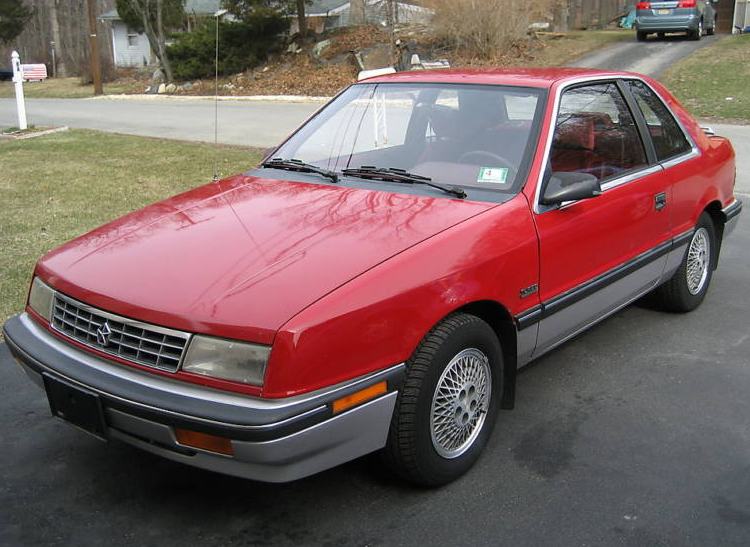
1989 Plymouth Sundance RS

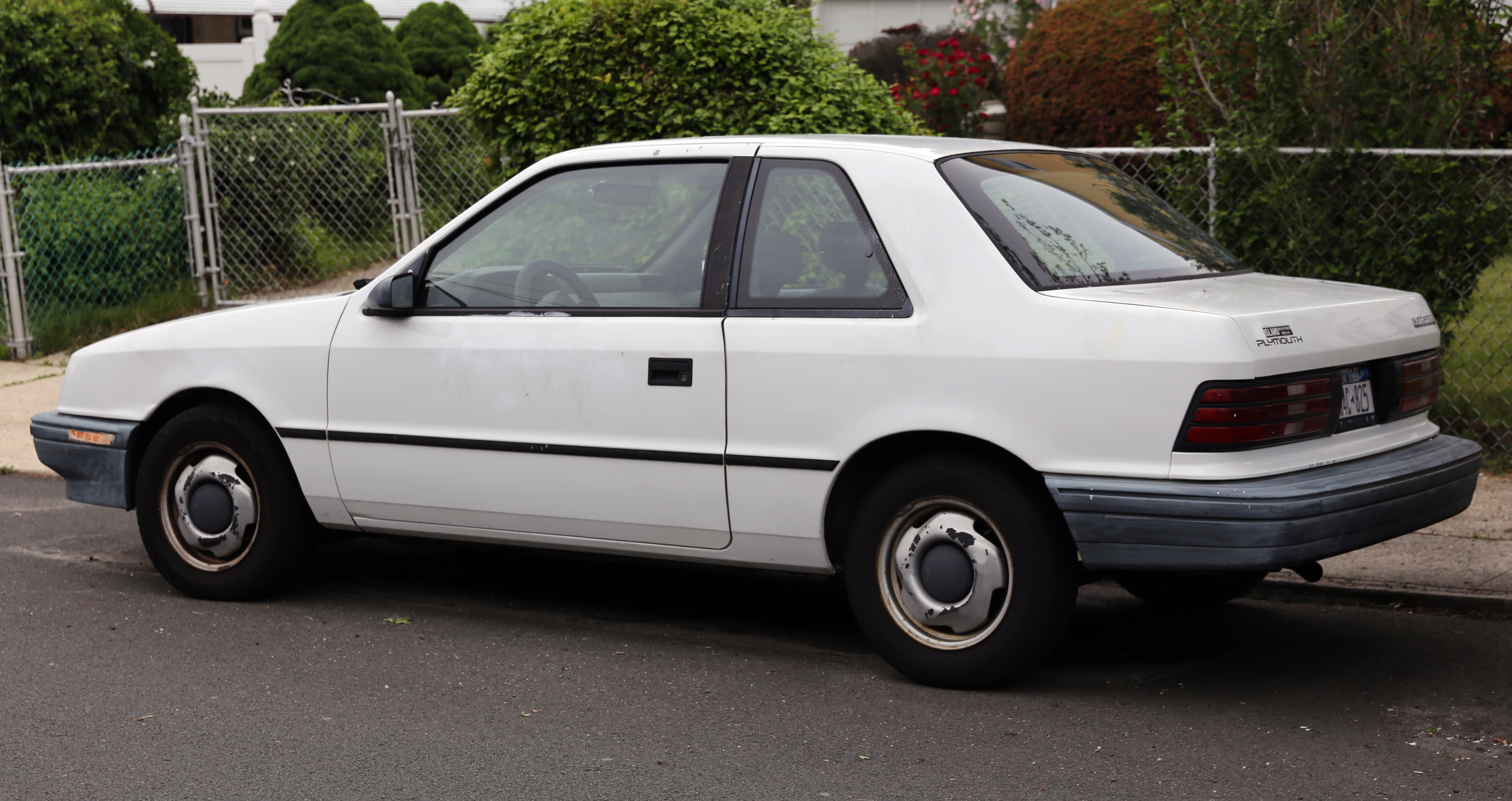
1992 Plymouth Sundance America (rear)

Features varied over the years, but some features included: power windows, power adjustable mirrors, power door locks, power adjustable driver seat, cruise control, tilt steering wheel, variable intermittent delay windshield wipers, overhead console with map lights and compass/temperature display, upgraded "highline" instrument cluster with tachometer, "light package" that added lighting in the trunk, glove box, under-hood mounted light and rear door dome light switches (4 door models), remote trunk release, rear window defroster, Fog lights, mag wheels, Four wheel disc brakes, Infinity sound system, a cassette player, a sunroof, anti-lock brake systems and on turbocharger equipped cars, there was also a vacuum/boost gauge and a message center that monitored four vehicle functions, door ajar, washer fluid level, etc..

=== Trim levels ===
Hatchback:

- Base 1987-1990, 1993-1994
- America/S 1991-1992
- Highline 1991-1992
- ES 1987-1994 (Shadow)
- RS 1988-1991 (Sundance)
- Duster 1992-1994 (Sundance)

Convertible:

- ES 1991-1993
- Highline 1991-1993

== Plymouth Sundance ==
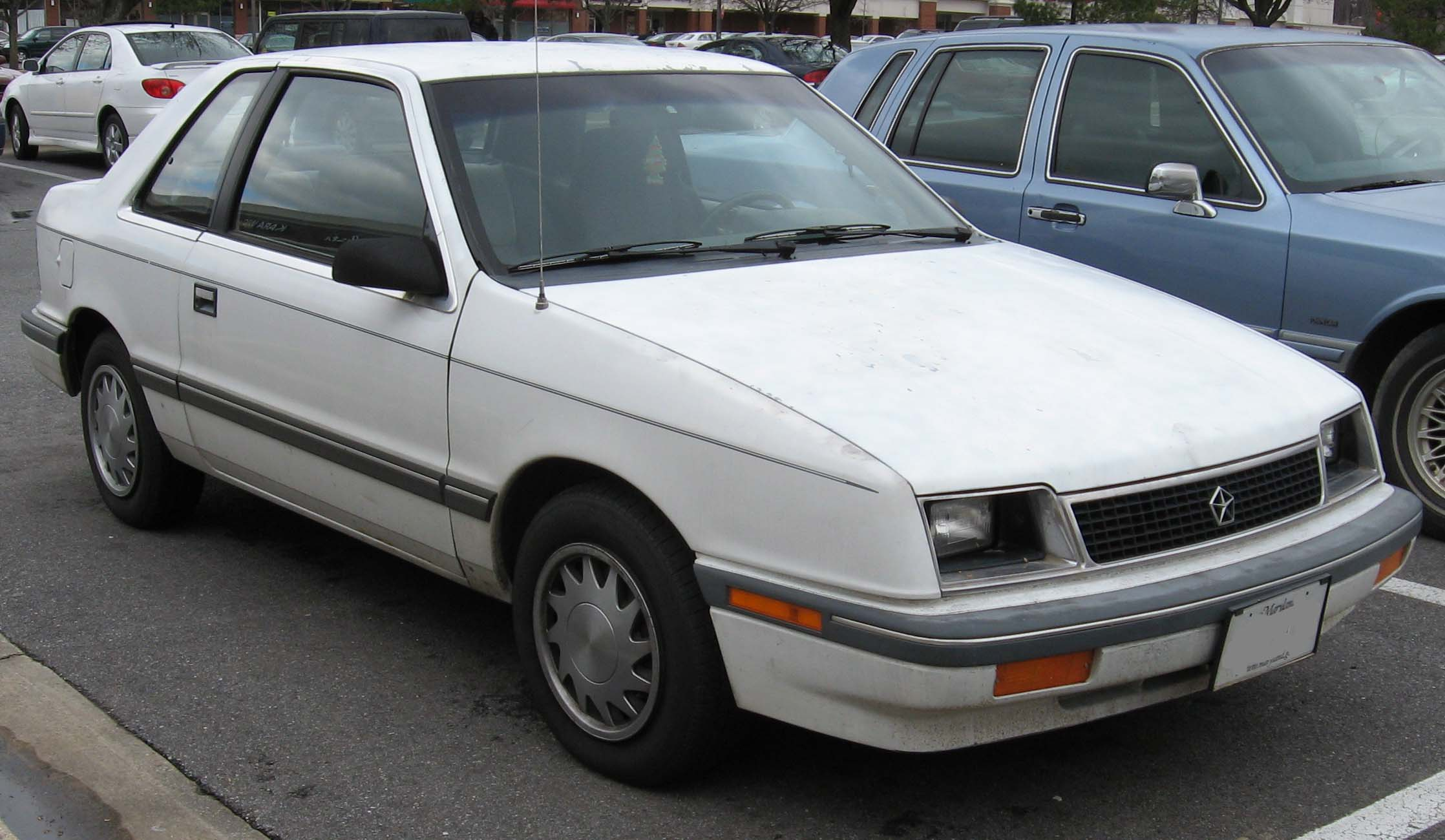
1987–1988 Plymouth Sundance 3-door

For the Sundance's first year, it was available in a single base model. For 1988, a higher-end RS model was available. The RS model, which stood for Rally Sport, came with standard features that included two-tone paint, fog lights, and a leather-wrapped steering wheel. It was also available with a turbocharged 2.5 L inline-four engine, and other amenities like an Infinity sound system, tinted window glass, and dual power mirrors. For 1991, the base model split into two distinct models: entry-level America and mid-level Highline, in addition to the high-end RS. The stripped-down America had previously been offered for the Plymouth Horizon's final year in 1990.

For 1992, the RS model was dropped, in favor of the revival of the Duster name for a performance version of the Sundance. The Duster featured a 3.0 L V6, special alloy wheels, "Duster" graphics, a body-colored grille & trim, as well as other equipment. Although the Sundance was criticized by some as being a poor choice to bear the "Duster" name, the car offered very good performance and decent handling at a low cost (only about $2,000 more than a base Sundance), which was said to be part of the reason why Chrysler used the "Duster" name, as those were the qualities the original car offered.

For the 1993 model year, the America model was replaced by a better-equipped base model. The Highline would also be dropped for 1993.

Production Figures:

Plymouth Sundance Production Figures
	3-door	5-door	Yearly Total
1987	35,719	39,960	75,679
1988	34,827	53,521	88,348
1989	34,211	51,350	85,561
1990	21,702	39,328	61,030
1991	25,161	32,136	57,297
1992	27,936	37,618	65,554
1993	37,312	36,993	74,305
Total	216,868	290,906	507,774

== European market ==
Between April 1988 and 1991, Chrysler offered the Dodge Shadow in numerous European markets as the Chrysler ES. The ES was based on the Dodge Shadow ES and was relatively the same vehicle, only without the "Shadow" badge. Offered only as a three-door hatchback, the standard engine was the fuel-injected 2.2-liter version, with an optional turbocharger. For 1989, the 2.2 engine was replaced by the larger 2.5-liter unit. Engines were linked to a standard five-speed manual transmission, with a three-speed automatic available as an extra-cost option. As European sales figures turned out to be very poor, sales of the Chrysler ES ended in mid-1991, meaning that Chrysler abandoned the segment in Europe until the 1995 introduction of the Chrysler Neon.

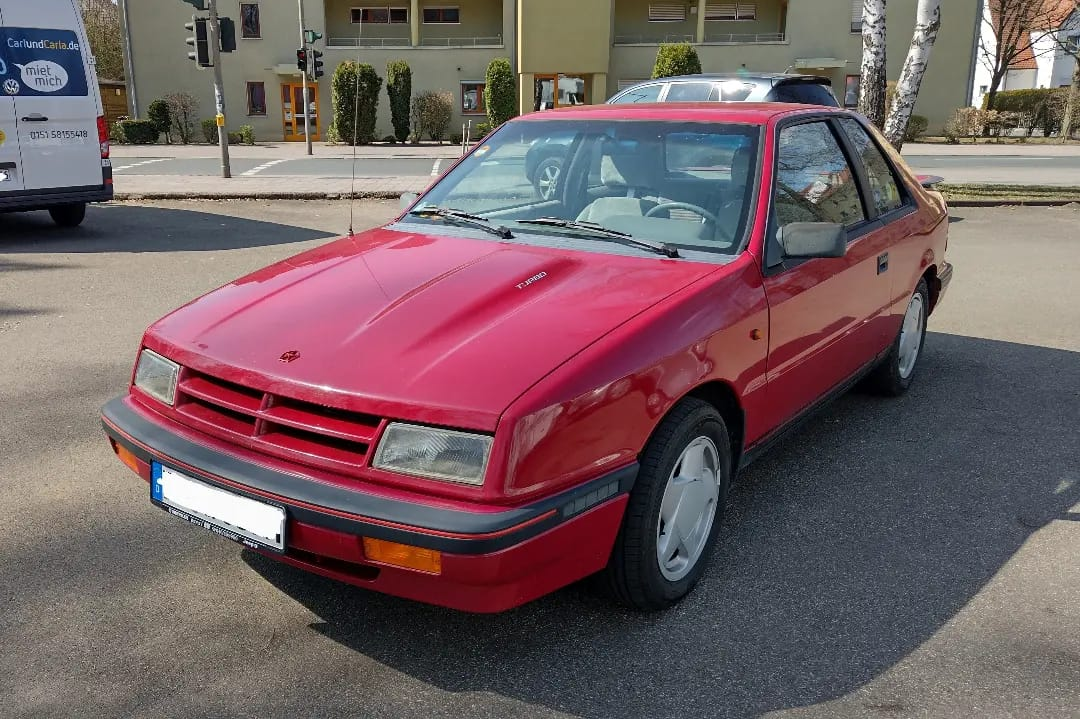
Chrysler ES Turbo (Germany)

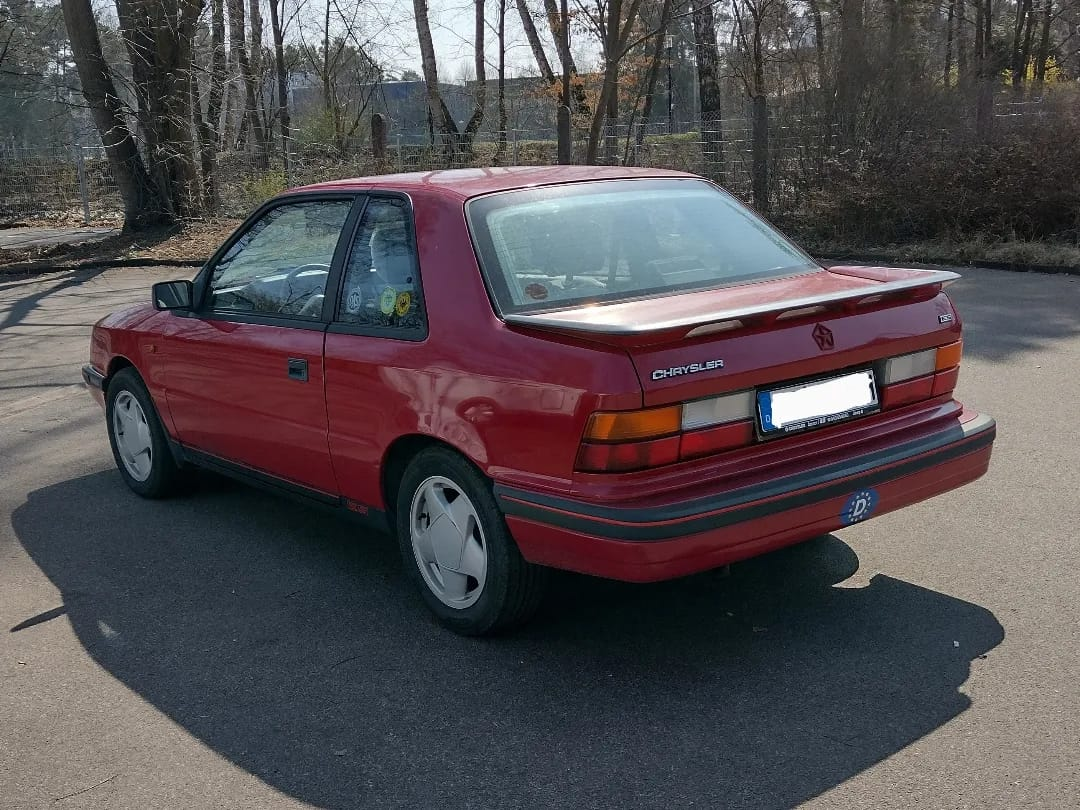
Rear view

== Shelby CSX ==
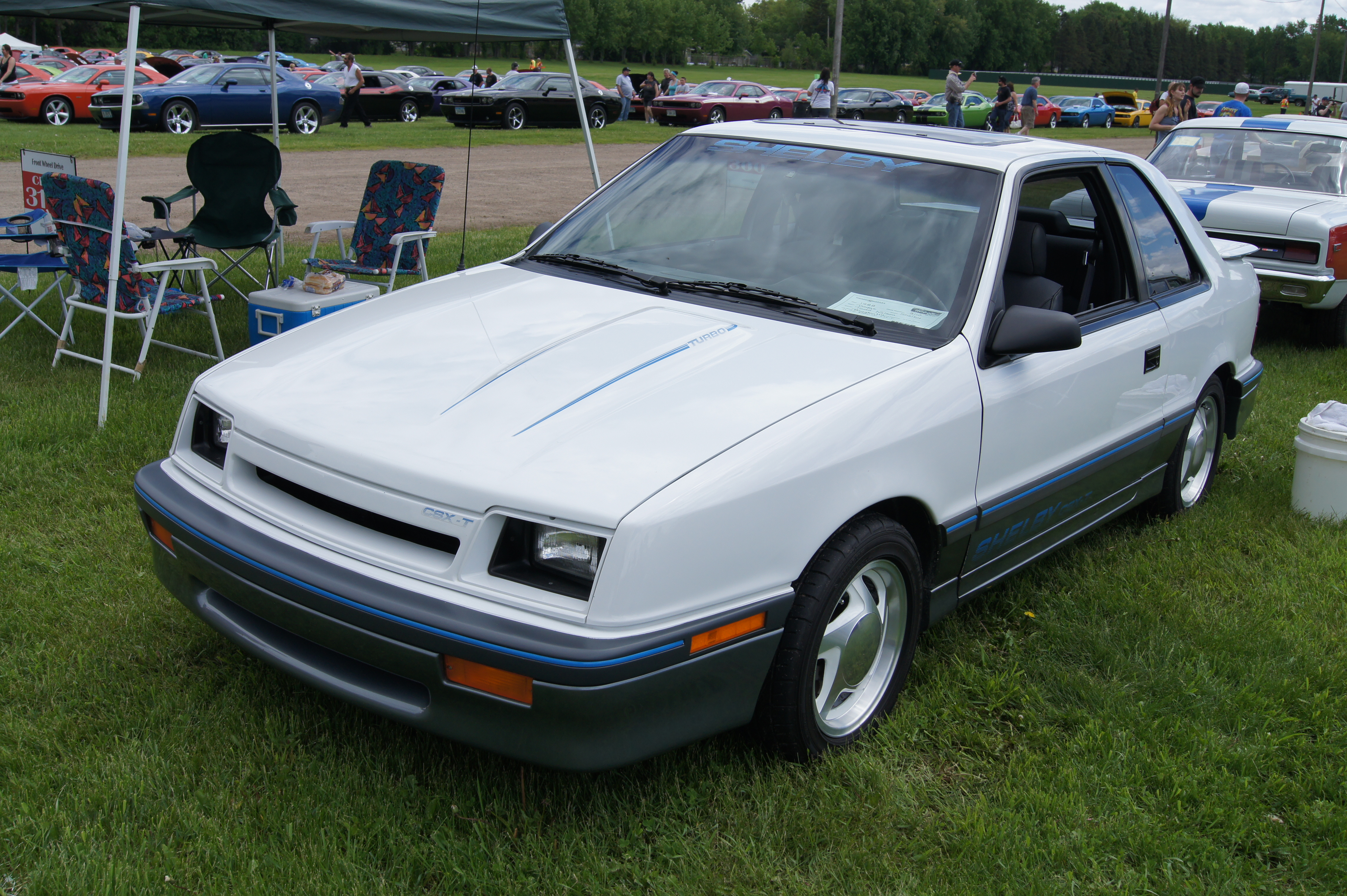
Shelby CSX-T

Carroll Shelby Enterprises modified Shadows into several performance-oriented vehicles such as the Shelby CSX, which was equipped with a turbocharged 2.2 L engine producing 174 hp (130 kW). Because of the car's light weight and powerful engine, it was capable of acceleration equal or greater than that of many contemporary muscle and sports cars. A version without the intercooler, rated at 150 hp (112 kW), was sold to Thrifty as the CSX-T.
