= Shelby Lancer =

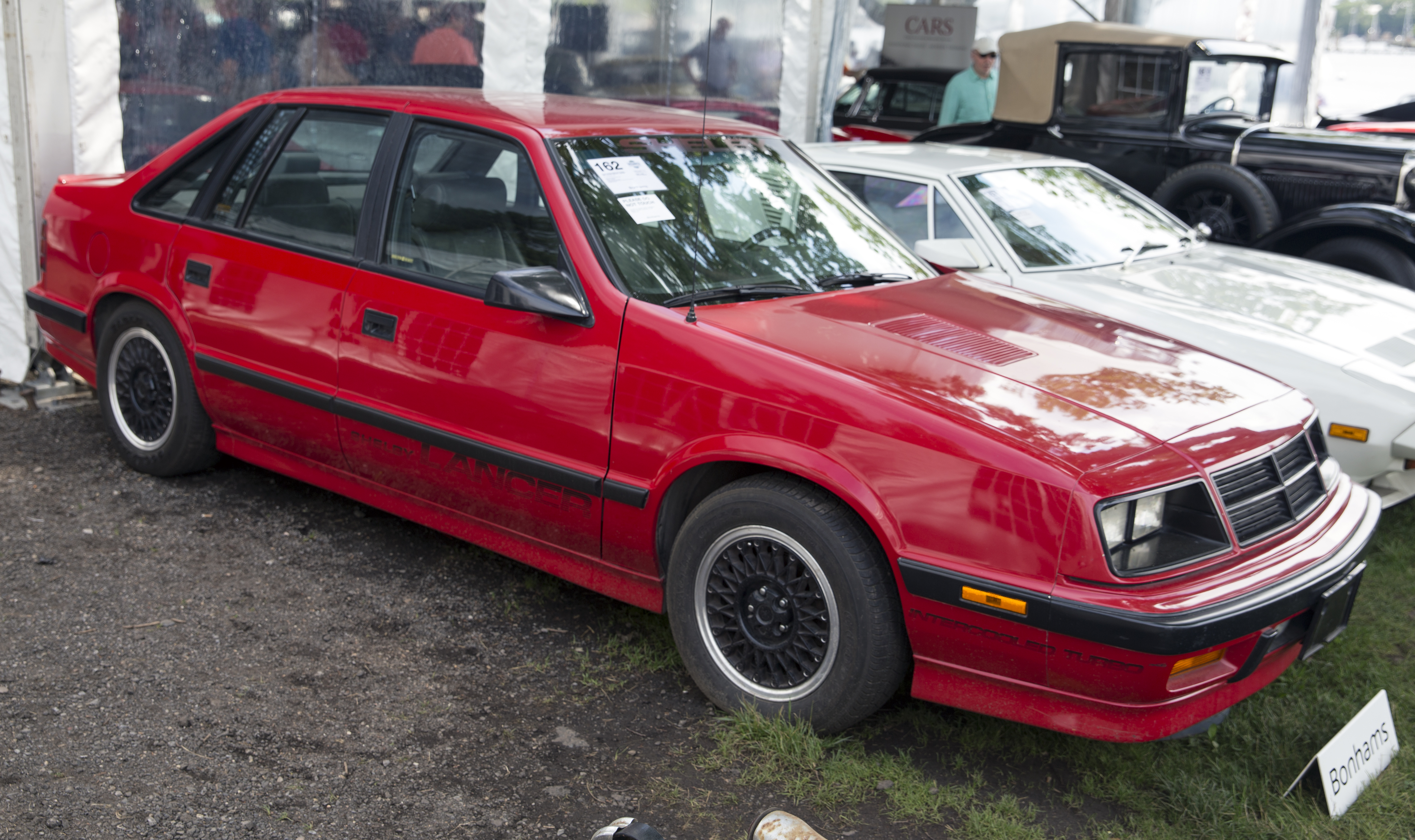

Overview
- Manufacturer: Chrysler; Shelby American
- Production: 1987 (Shelby, 800 units); 1988–1989 (Chrysler, 487 units)

Body and chassis
- Class: Mid-size
- Body style: 5-door hatchback
- Layout: Transverse front-engine, front-wheel drive
- Platform: H-body
- Related: Chrysler LeBaron GTS; Dodge Lancer

Powertrain
- Engine: 2.2 L Turbo II I4
- Transmission: 5-speed A520 manual 3-speed A413 automatic

The Shelby Lancer is a limited-production hatchback sports sedan based on the Dodge Lancer. It was modified by Shelby Automobiles in Whittier, California, for the 1987 model year and sold under the Shelby name, with an announced run of 800 cars. Dodge continued the model for 1988 and 1989 as the Dodge Lancer Shelby, an option package on the Lancer ES.

== 1987 Shelby Lancer ==
The Shelby Lancer was based on the Dodge Lancer ES and was titled as a Shelby rather than a Dodge. Shelby's sales brochure positioned it against the Mercedes-Benz 190 2.3-16, Audi Turbo Quattro, and BMW 535i, and stated that engineering, tuning, testing, and final assembly were done at Shelby Automobiles. It listed for $16,995, compared with $11,250 for a standard Lancer ES. It was offered in Graphic Red only. Of the 800 announced units, 400 came with a 3-speed automatic transmission (A413) and leather interior, and 400 with a 5-speed manual transmission (A520) and cloth interior,

Standard equipment included air conditioning, power windows, mirrors and locks, and a 120-watt Pioneer DEX 77 Compact Disc player with AM/FM stereo, a nine-band graphic equalizer, two power amplifiers, ten speakers, a rear-seat remote control, and anti-theft coding. A CD player was an unusual feature for a car in 1987. Shelby-branded items included a numbered plaque on the dashboard, a leather-wrapped Shelby steering wheel, one-piece cast aluminum Shelby 15-inch wheels, and a Shelby valve cover. The various VIN plates and build labels on the car all indicated "Shelby Automobiles" instead of the typical Chrysler or Dodge labels found on normal production vehicles.

=== Powertrain and performance ===
Power came from a Turbo II 2.2-liter intercooled I4 producing 175 hp (130 kW) and 175 lb⋅ft (237 N⋅m) of torque. Shelby added an air-to-air intercooler, a redesigned intake manifold, and recalibrated multi-point fuel injection, and claimed 0–60 mph (97 km/h) in 7.7 seconds and a quarter mile in 15.7 seconds at 89 mph (143 km/h). Period tests recorded 0–60 mph times between 7.2 and 8.0 seconds, and top speed was 130 mph (209 km/h). Boost peaked at 12 psi.

=== Chassis ===
The suspension used Monroe Formula GP gas-charged struts and shocks, polyurethane bushings, and recalibrated anti-sway bars, with 205/60VR15 Goodyear Eagle "Gatorback" tires. Braking was by vented discs at the front and Kelsey-Hayes discs at the rear. Shelby claimed cornering of 0.85 g. Stiffer springs lowered the car slightly compared with the standard Lancer.

== 1988–1989 Dodge Lancer Shelby ==
For 1988 and 1989 the car was built and sold by Dodge as the Dodge Lancer Shelby, assembled alongside regular Lancers at Chrysler's Sterling Heights Assembly plant in Michigan. Cars with the 5-speed manual used an intercooled Turbo II engine rated at 174 hp (130 kW), while the optional 3-speed automatic was paired with a non-intercooled Turbo I rated at 146 hp (109 kW). The Dodge version used the standard Lancer ES sport suspension and rear drum brakes in place of the 1987 car's Shelby suspension and four-wheel discs. It was offered in red, white, or black, with a base price of $16,530. It was not numbered and lacked the Shelby wheels, steering wheel, and Pioneer stereo of the 1987 car.

Car and Driver tested a 1988 car in June 1988, recording 0–60 mph in 7.2 seconds, and criticized its ride, engine noise, and price. Dodge built 279 cars in 1988 and a reported 208 in 1989, for a total of 487, making it rarer than the Shelby-built car.

The car was also sold in Europe as the Chrysler GTS Shelby. A 1989 Dutch-language Chrysler brochure lists it with a turbocharged, intercooled 2.2-liter engine rated at 130 kW (174 hp) (177 PS), a 5-speed manual transmission, leather sport seats, and a top speed of 208 km/h (129 mph).

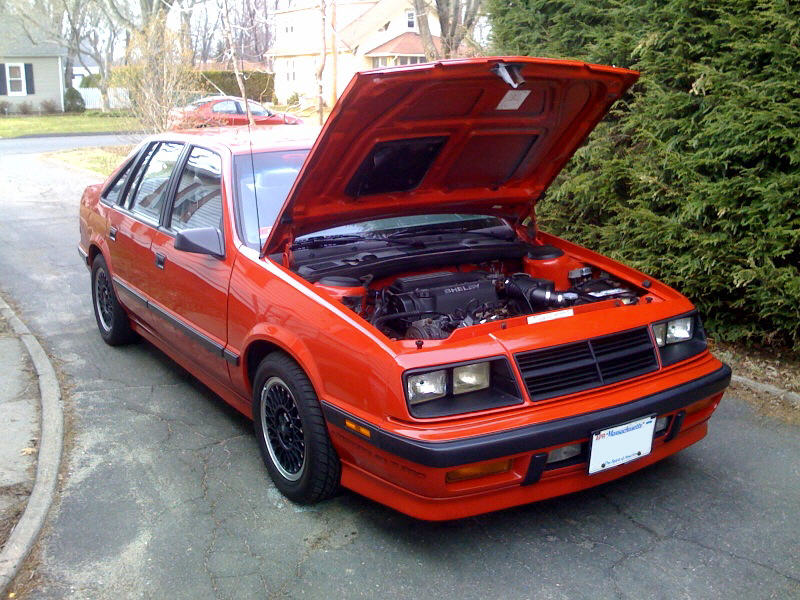
1987 Shelby Lancer Front

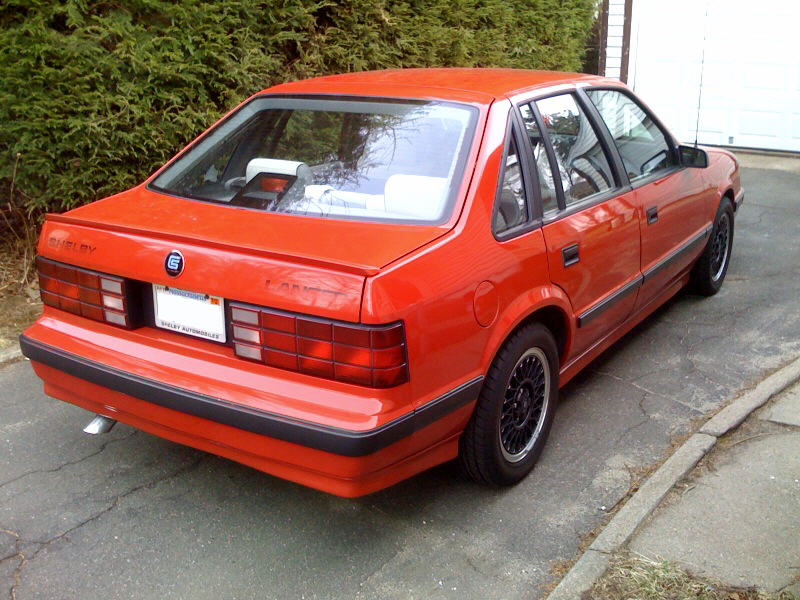
1987 Shelby Lancer Rear

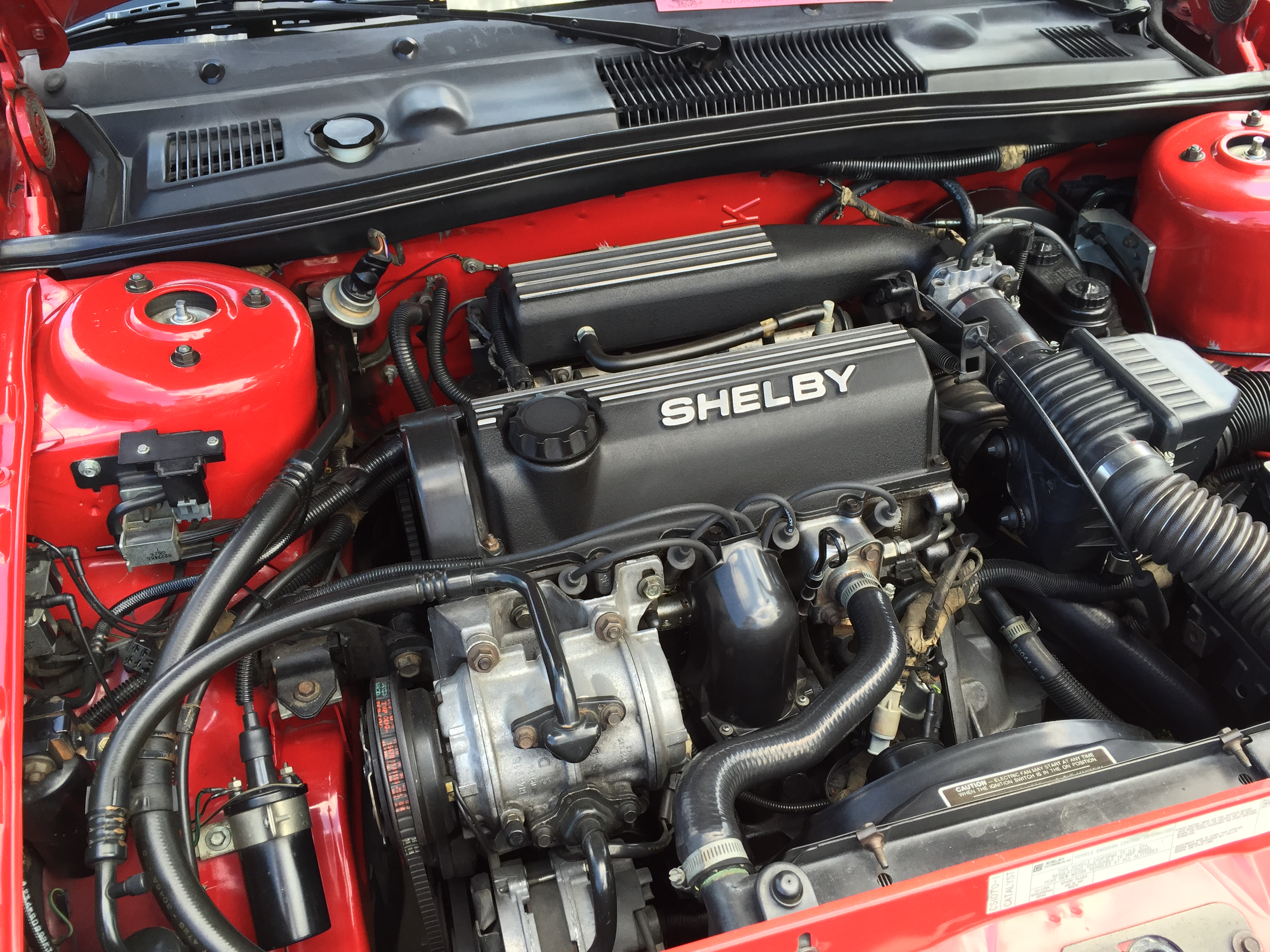
1987 Shelby Lancer engine
