= Plymouth (automobile) =

Defunct American automobile brand

- Product type: Automobile, vans, trucks
- Produced by: Chrysler Corporation; DaimlerChrysler
- Introduced: July 7, 1928; 98 years ago by Walter Chrysler
- Discontinued: June 29, 2001; 25 years ago
- Related brands: Dodge
- Markets: North America
- Previous owners: Chrysler Corporation (1928–1998); DaimlerChrysler (1998–2001)

Plymouth was a brand of automobiles produced by Chrysler Corporation and its successor DaimlerChrysler. The brand was launched in 1928 to compete in what was then described as the "low-priced" market segment that was dominated by Chevrolet and Ford. It became a high-volume seller for the automaker until the late 1990s. Plymouth cars were marketed primarily in the United States and Canada. The brand was withdrawn from the marketplace in 2001. The Plymouth models that were produced up until then were either discontinued or rebranded as Chrysler or Dodge.

== History ==
=== Origins ===
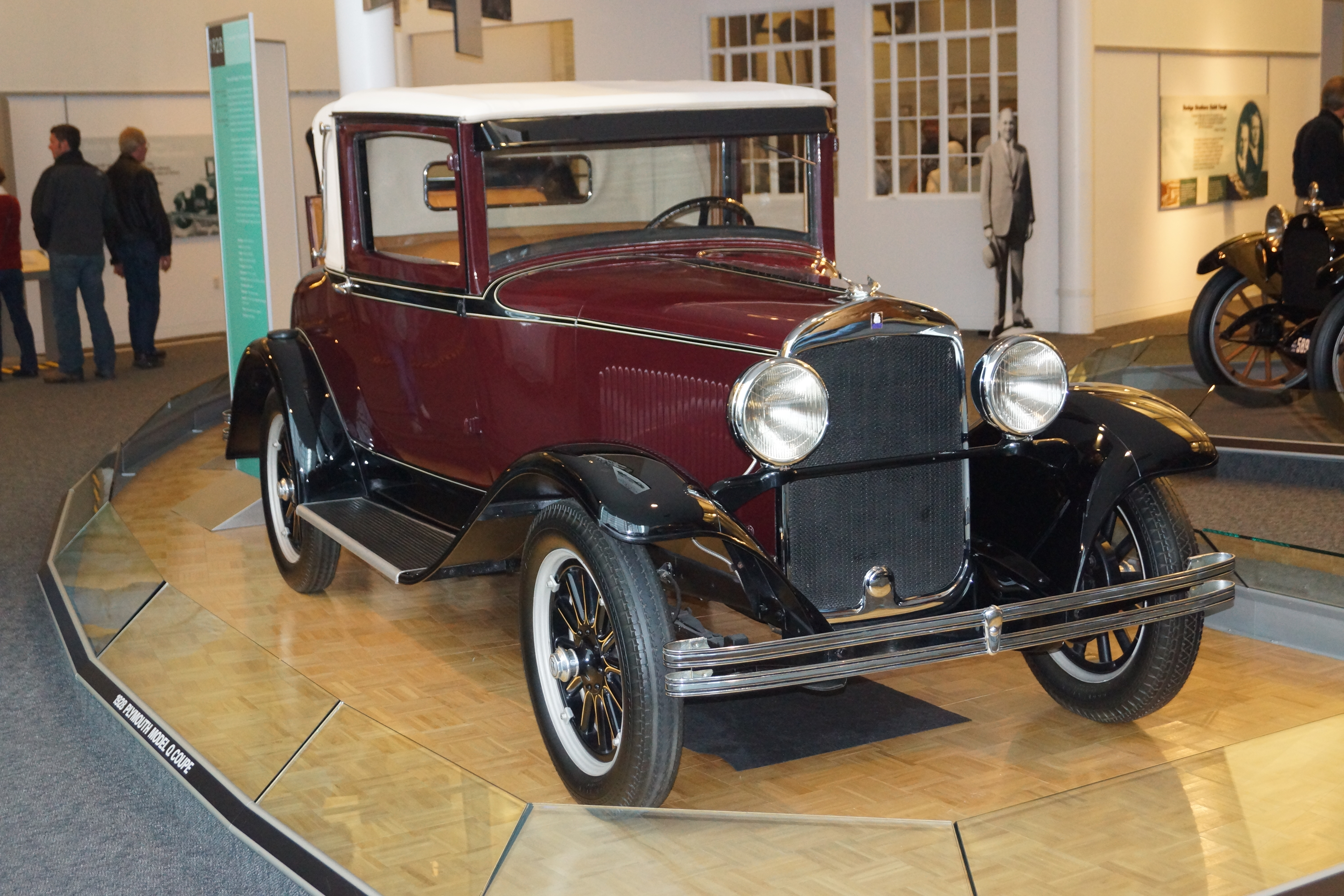
1928 Plymouth Model Q Roadster

The Plymouth automobile was introduced at Madison Square Garden on July 7, 1928. It was Chrysler Corporation's first entry in the low-priced field previously dominated by Chevrolet and Ford. Plymouths were initially priced higher than the competition, but offered standard features such as internal expanding hydraulic brakes that Ford and Chevrolet did not provide. Plymouths were originally sold exclusively through Chrysler dealerships, offering a low-cost alternative to the upscale Chrysler-brand cars, listing the 4-door 5-passenger Touring Sedan at US$695. The logo featured a prow view of the ship Mayflower which landed at Plymouth Rock in Plymouth, Massachusetts. However, the inspiration for the Plymouth brand name came from Plymouth binder twine, produced by the Plymouth Cordage Company, also of Plymouth. The name was chosen by Joe Frazer due to the popularity of the twine among farmers.

The origins of Plymouth can be traced back to the Maxwell automobile. When Walter P. Chrysler took over control of the troubled Maxwell-Chalmers car company in the early 1920s, he inherited the Maxwell as part of the package. After he used the company's facilities to successfully create and launch the six-cylinder Chrysler automobile in 1924, he decided to create a lower-priced companion car, using lessons learned when he was running Buick under William C. Durant at GM. So for 1926 the Maxwell was reworked and rebadged as the lower-end four-cylinder Chrysler Model 52. In 1928, the 52 was once again redesigned to create the Chrysler-Plymouth Model Q, although print advertisements called it Plymouth and did not mention engine size or model designation. The "Chrysler" portion of the nameplate was dropped with the introduction of the Plymouth Model U in 1929.

=== Great Depression, 1930s–1940s ===
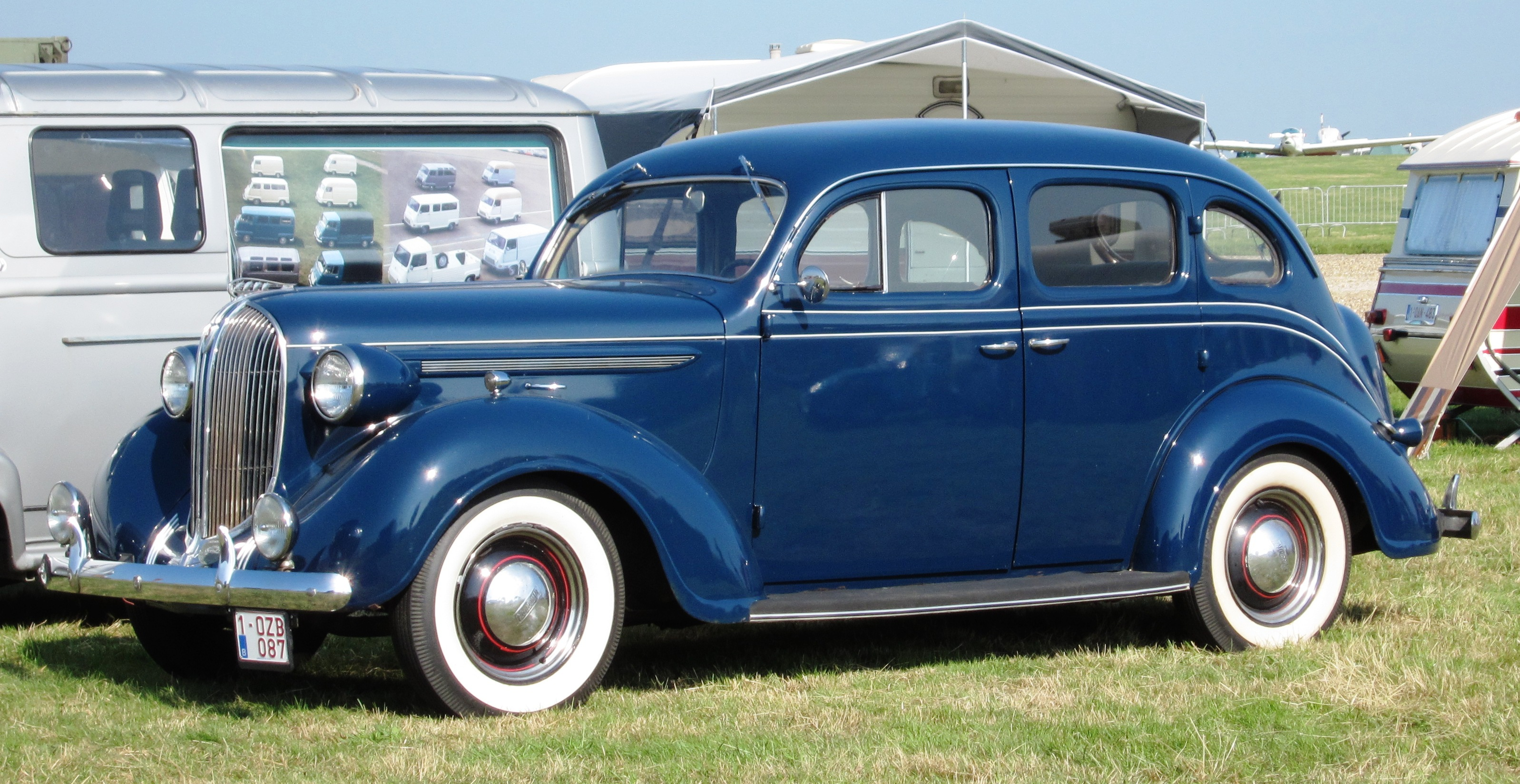
1938 Plymouth P6 4-door sedan

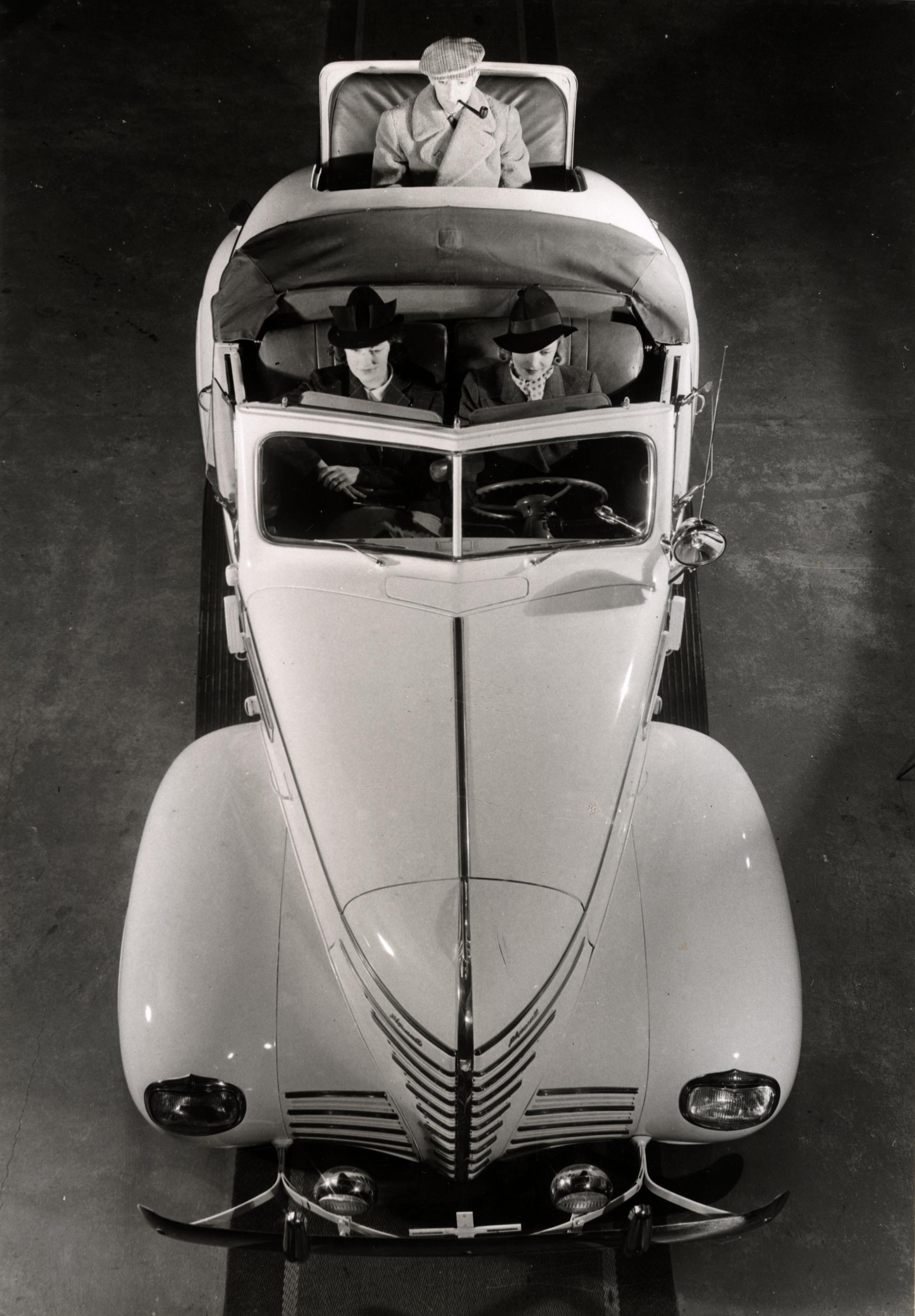
1939 Plymouth in a Swedish 1940s fashion photo

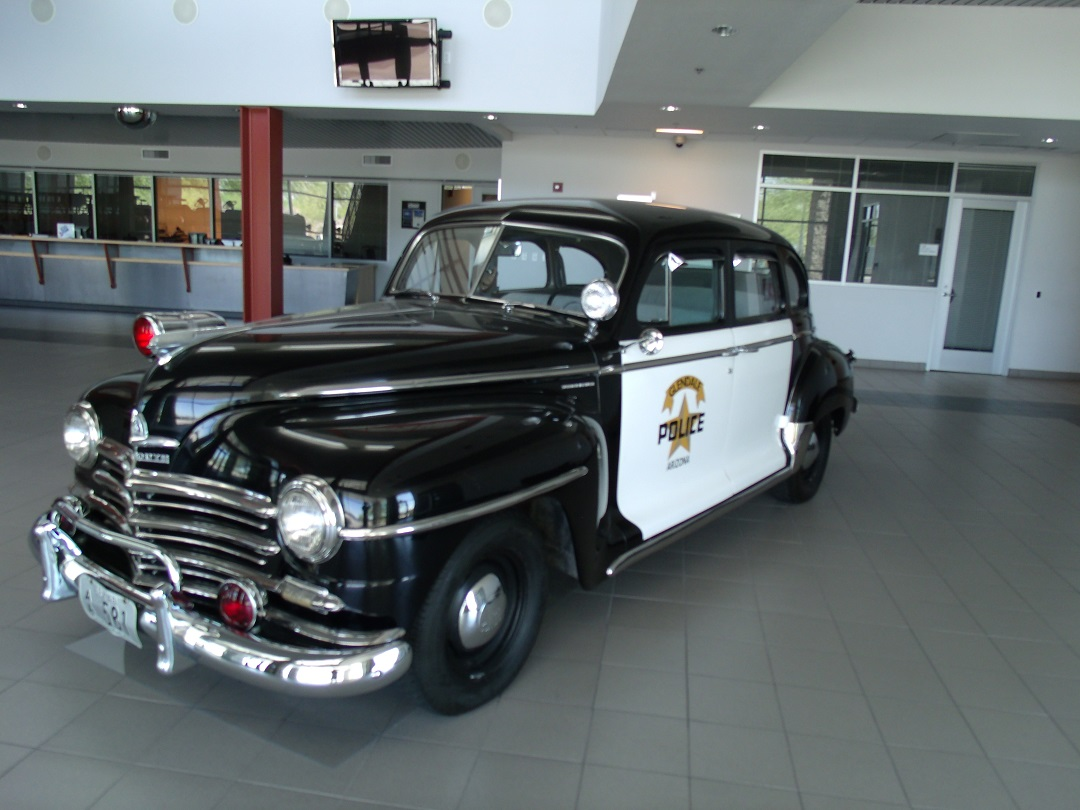
1947 Plymouth police car of Glendale Police Dept., Arizona

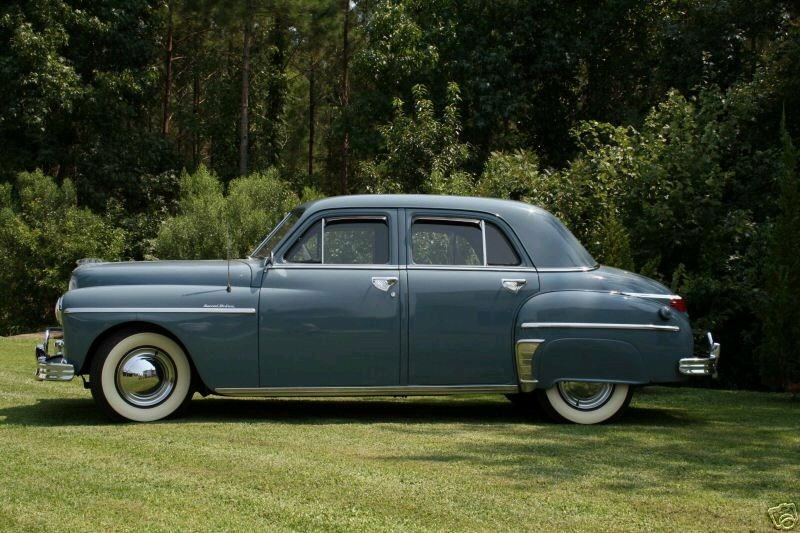
1949 Plymouth Special Deluxe Four Door Sedan

While the original purpose of the Plymouth was to serve the lower end of a booming automobile market, during the Great Depression of the 1930s the division helped significantly to ensure the survival of the Chrysler Corporation when many other car companies failed. Beginning in 1930 Plymouths were sold by all three Chrysler divisions (Chrysler, DeSoto, and Dodge). Plymouth sales were a bright spot during this dismal automotive period, and by 1931 Plymouth rose to number three in sales among all cars. In 1931 with the Model PA, the company introduced floating power and boasted, "The smoothness of an eight – the economy of a four."

In 1933, Chrysler decided to catch up with Ford, Chevrolet, and Pontiac in engine cylinder count. The 190 cu in (3.1 L) version of Chrysler's flathead-six engine was equipped with a downdraft carburetor and installed in the new 1933 Plymouth PC, introduced on November 17, 1932. However, Chrysler had reduced the PC's wheelbase from 112 to 107 in (284.5 to 271.8 cm), and the car sold poorly. By April 1933, the Dodge division's Model DP chassis, with a 112-inch (284.5 cm) wheelbase, was put under the PC body with DP front fenders, hood, and radiator shell. The model designation was advanced to 'PD'. The PC was redesigned to look similar to the PD and became the 'Standard Six' (PCXX). It had been the 'Plymouth Six' at the introduction and was sold through to the end of 1933, but in much lower numbers. In 1937, Plymouth (along with the other Chrysler makes) added safety features such as flat dashboards with recessed controls and the back of the front seat padded for the rear seat occupants.

The PC was shipped overseas to Sweden, Denmark, and the UK, as well as Australia. In the UK, it was sold as a 'Chrysler Kew', the town of Kew being the location of the Chrysler factory in a district in the London Borough of Richmond upon Thames. The flathead six, which started with the 1933 Model PC, stayed in the Plymouth until the 1959 models.

In 1939, Plymouth produced 417,528 vehicles, of which 5,967 were two-door convertible coupes with rumble seats. The 1939 convertible coupe was prominently featured at Chrysler's exhibit at the 1939 New York World's Fair, advertised as the first mass-production convertible with a power-folding top. It featured a 201 cu in (3.3 L), 82 hp (61 kW; 83 PS) version of the flathead six engine.

For much of its life, Plymouth was one of the top-selling American automobile brands; it, together with Chevrolet and Ford, was commonly referred to as the "low-priced three" marques in the American market. Plymouth almost surpassed Ford in 1940 and 1941 as the second-most popular make of automobiles in the U.S.

Year	Production
1939	417,528
1948	381,139
1949	569,260

=== 1950s ===
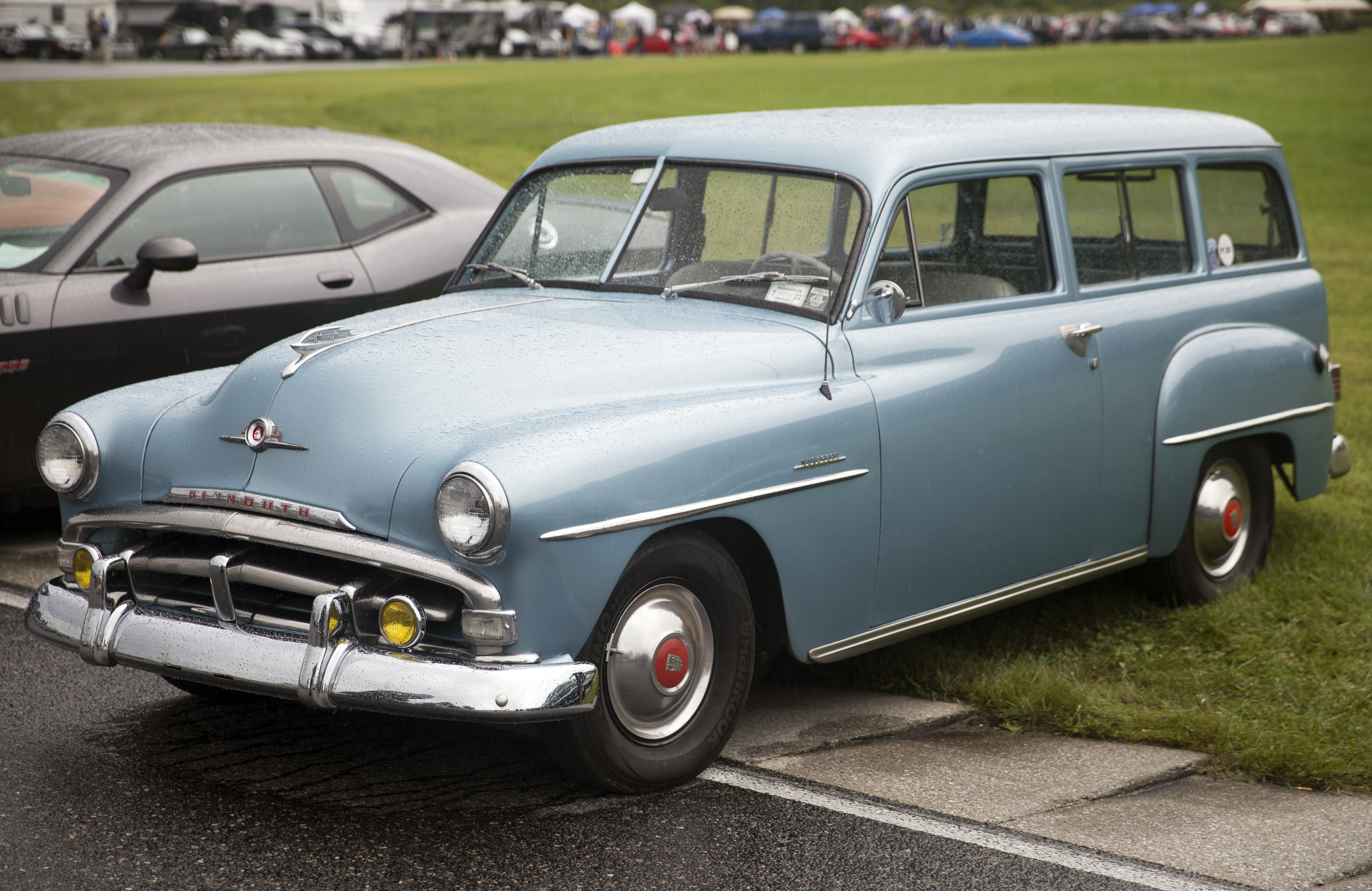
1952 Plymouth Suburban

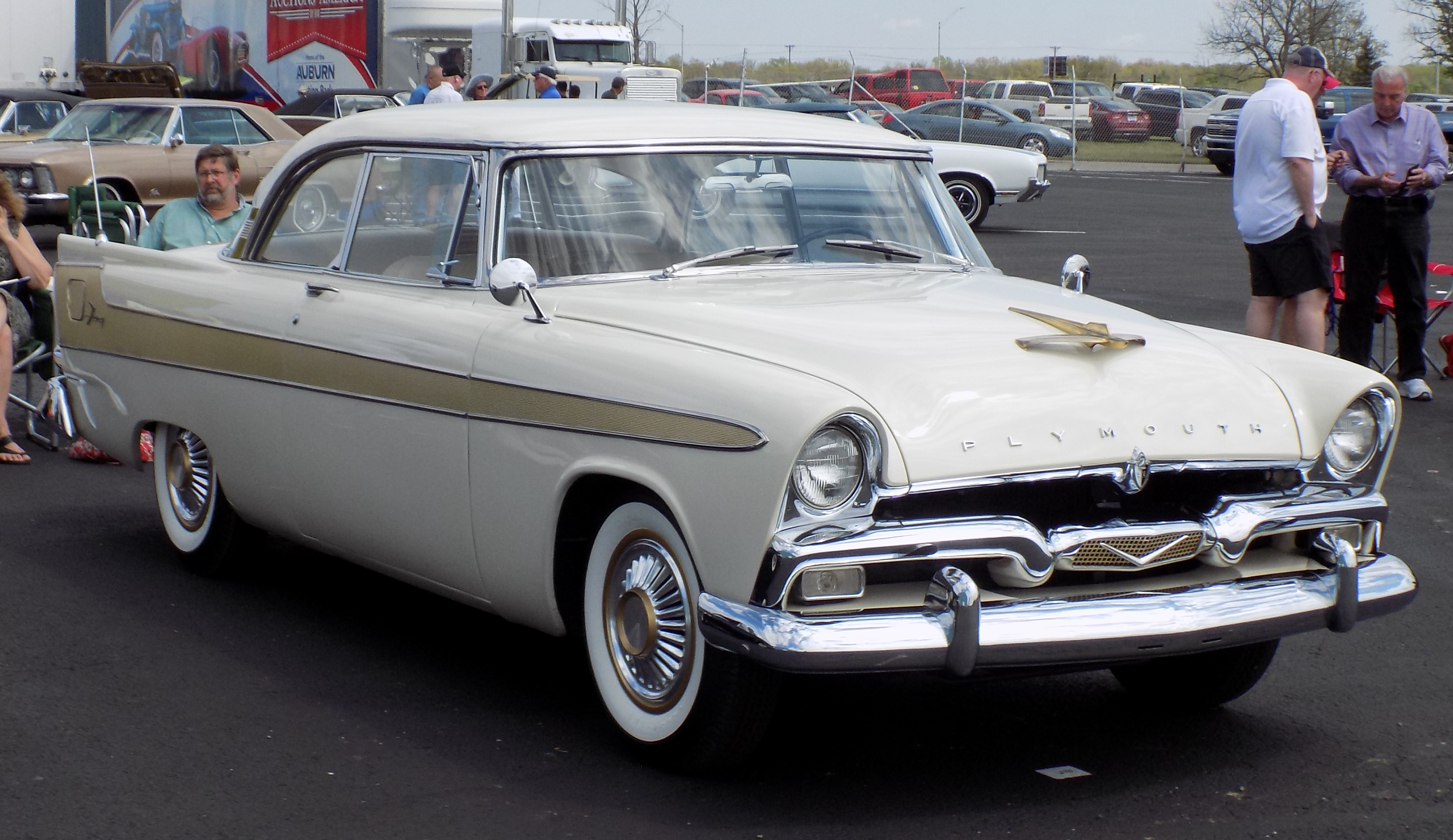
1956 Plymouth Fury, the second year for Virgil Exner's "Forward Look" cars

In 1954, Plymouth offered an optional torque converter mated to a standard three-speed transmission, marketed as "PowerFlite". It improved upon the "Hy-Drive" semiautomatic transmission which had been introduced the previous year. On March 25, 1954, Chrysler officially introduced to the public its first attempt at a turbine-powered car. Chrysler installed an experimental turbine, developed specifically for road vehicles, in a Plymouth. The car used was a standard 1954 Belvedere two-door hardtop. This was the beginning of a decades-long but unsuccessful attempt to develop and market a viable car powered by a turbine engine.

1955 saw Plymouth's dramatic redesign by Chrysler stylist Virgil Exner. Longer, lower, wider, it was a sensation and sales zoomed up 52% over 1954. In addition to the "Forward Look" styling, the new car got its first modern, overhead-valve V8 displacing 241 cu in (3.9 L). The optional PowerFlite fully automatic transmission had a selector lever on the instrument panel.

In 1956, Plymouth introduced the Fury, a "halo" model in the Belvedere series that featured a high-performance 240-hp 303 cu in (5.0 L) V8, and gold-anodized trim on a body available in Eggshell White only and limited to the two-door hardtop. The Fury continued to be a special, high-end car until 1959, when it replaced the Belvedere as the de luxe series, available in hardtop, convertible, and sedan body styles. The 1957 and 1958 Furys were painted in Buckskin Beige, replacing Eggshell White as the only available exterior color. Optional equipment included air conditioning, automatic transmission, power steering, and power-assist brakes. In 1959, a special Sport Fury was available as the "special" sporty Plymouth. The PowerFlite automatic was now controlled by reliable mechanical push buttons on a pod on the left side of the dash.

In 1957, Virgil Exner's new Forward Look design theme, advertised by Plymouth with the tagline "Suddenly, it's 1960", produced cars with advanced styling compared to Chevrolet or Ford. The 1957 total production soared to 726,009, about 200,000 more than 1956, and the largest output yet for Plymouth. However, the 1957–1958 Forward Look models suffered from poor materials, spotty build quality, and inadequate corrosion protection; they were rust-prone and greatly damaged Chrysler's reputation.

Year	Production	
1950	567,381	
1951	607,691	
1952	466,289	
1953	654,414	
1954	396,702	
1955	746,361	
1956	452,918	
1957	655,006	
1958	367,296	
1959	413,204	incl. Valiant

=== 1960s ===
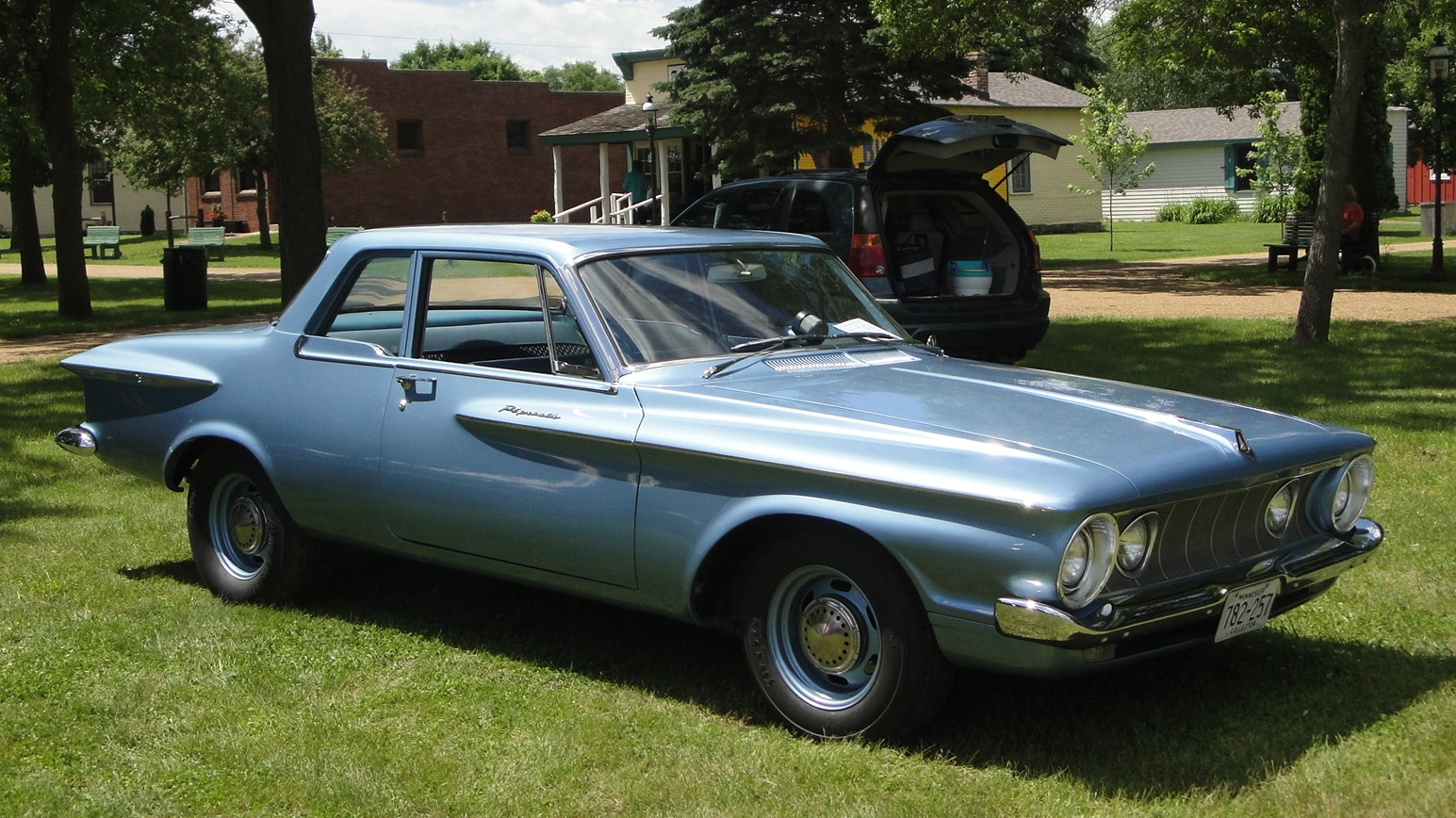
1962 Plymouth Belvedere

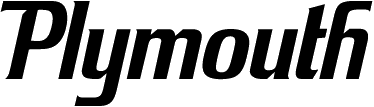
1964–69 logo

Although Plymouth sales suffered as a result of the quality control problems and excesses of the Exner-styled models in the early 1960s, people bought enough of the cars to keep the division profitable. Starting in 1961, the Valiant compact became a Plymouth, further boosting sales. Under the impression that Chevrolet was about to "downsize" its 1962 models, Chrysler introduced a significantly smaller standard Plymouth for 1962. As is known, Chevrolet's big cars were not downsized, catching Plymouth in a sales slump in a market where "bigger was better". The 1963 Fury, Belvedere, and Savoy were slightly larger, featuring a totally new body style, highlighted by prominent outboard front parking lights. For 1964, Plymouth got another major restyle, featuring a new "slantback" roofline for hardtop coupes that would prove popular.

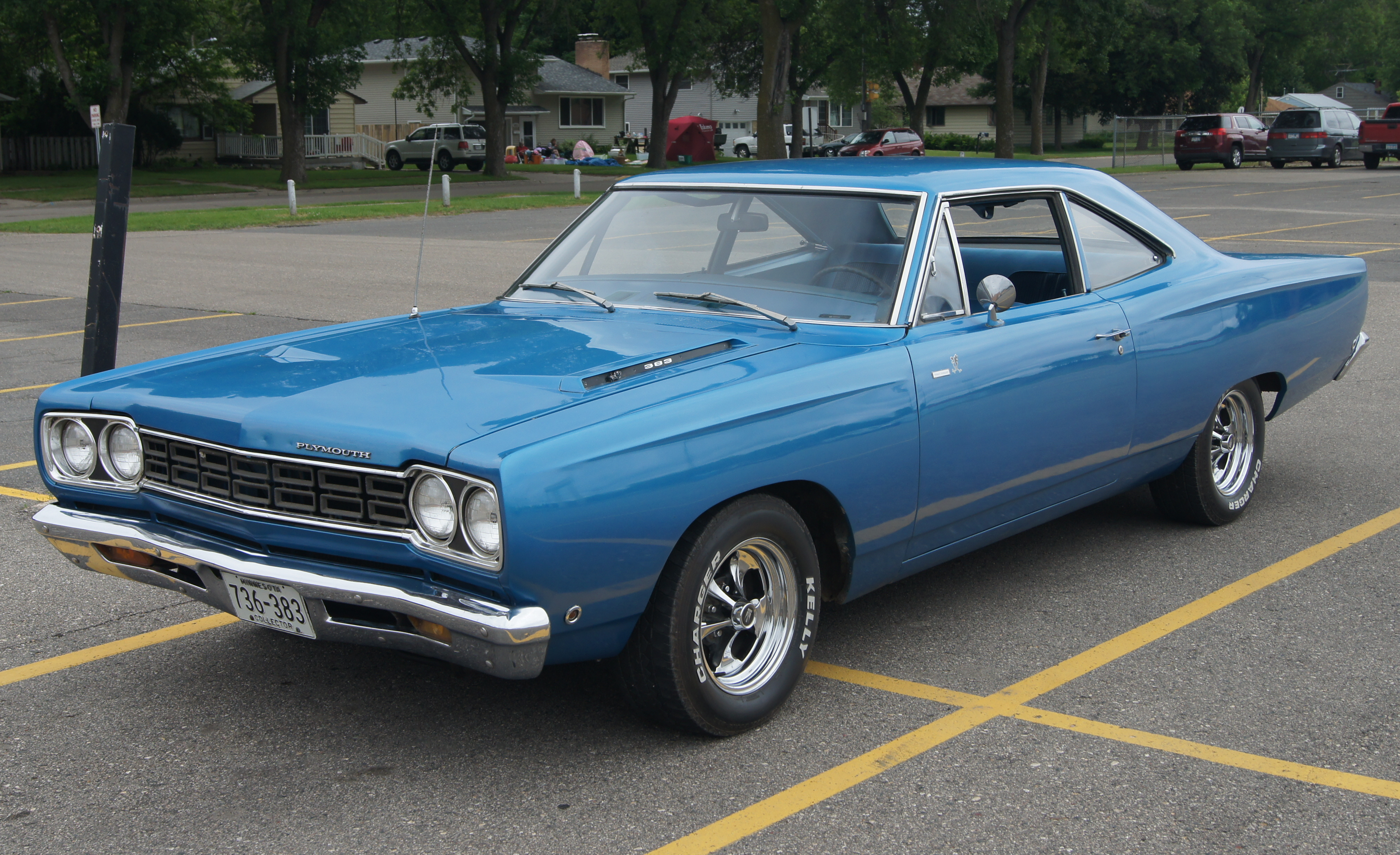
1968 Plymouth Roadrunner, one of the Muscle car era models

For 1965, the Plymouth Fury models were built on the new C-body platform. The Savoy line was discontinued and the Belvedere was classified as an intermediate, retaining the B-body platform used starting 1962. The low-end series was Fury I, the mid-level model was Fury II, and the higher-end models were Fury IIIs. The Sport Fury, which featured bucket seats and a console shifter, was a mix of luxury and sport. Ford and Chevrolet had introduced luxury editions of their big cars for 1965 and Plymouth responded with the 1966 Sport Fury with a 383 cu in (6.3 L) V8 and the VIP was introduced as a more luxurious version of the Fury. Furys, Belvederes, and Valiants continued to sell well during the late-1960s and early-1970s. While Fury I and Fury II were only available in the U.S. as sedans, Fury II was available as a two-door hardtop in addition to the pillared sedans in Canada.

The performance car market segment expanded during the late 1960s and early 1970s. The 1964 Barracuda fastback is considered the first of Plymouth's sporty cars. Based on the Valiant, it was available with the Slant Six, or 273 cu in (4.5 L) small block V8. For 1967, Plymouth introduced the Belvedere GTX, a bucket-seat high-style hardtop coupe and convertible that could be ordered with either the "Super Commando" 440 cu in (7.2 L) or Hemi 426 cu in (7.0 L) V8 engines. Looking for an advantage at the drag races, 1968 had a stripped-down Belvedere coupe, the Road Runner, which featured a bench seat and minimal interior and exterior trim, but was available with Chrysler's big-block engines and a floor-mounted four-speed manual transmission. The Barracuda, originally a "compact sporty car", became available with the 426 Hemi and 440 big-block engines in 1968. The GTX, Barracuda, Road Runner, Sport Fury GT, and Valiant Duster 340, were marketed by Plymouth as the 'Rapid Transit System', which was similar to Dodge's 'Scat Pack' concept. During this time, the brand also competed in professional automobile racing. Examples include Richard Petty's career with Plymouth in NASCAR; Dan Gurney, who raced a 'Cuda as part of the All American Racers in numerous Trans Am events; and Sox and Martin, one of the most well-known drag-racing teams of the period, only raced Plymouths after 1964.

=== 1970s ===
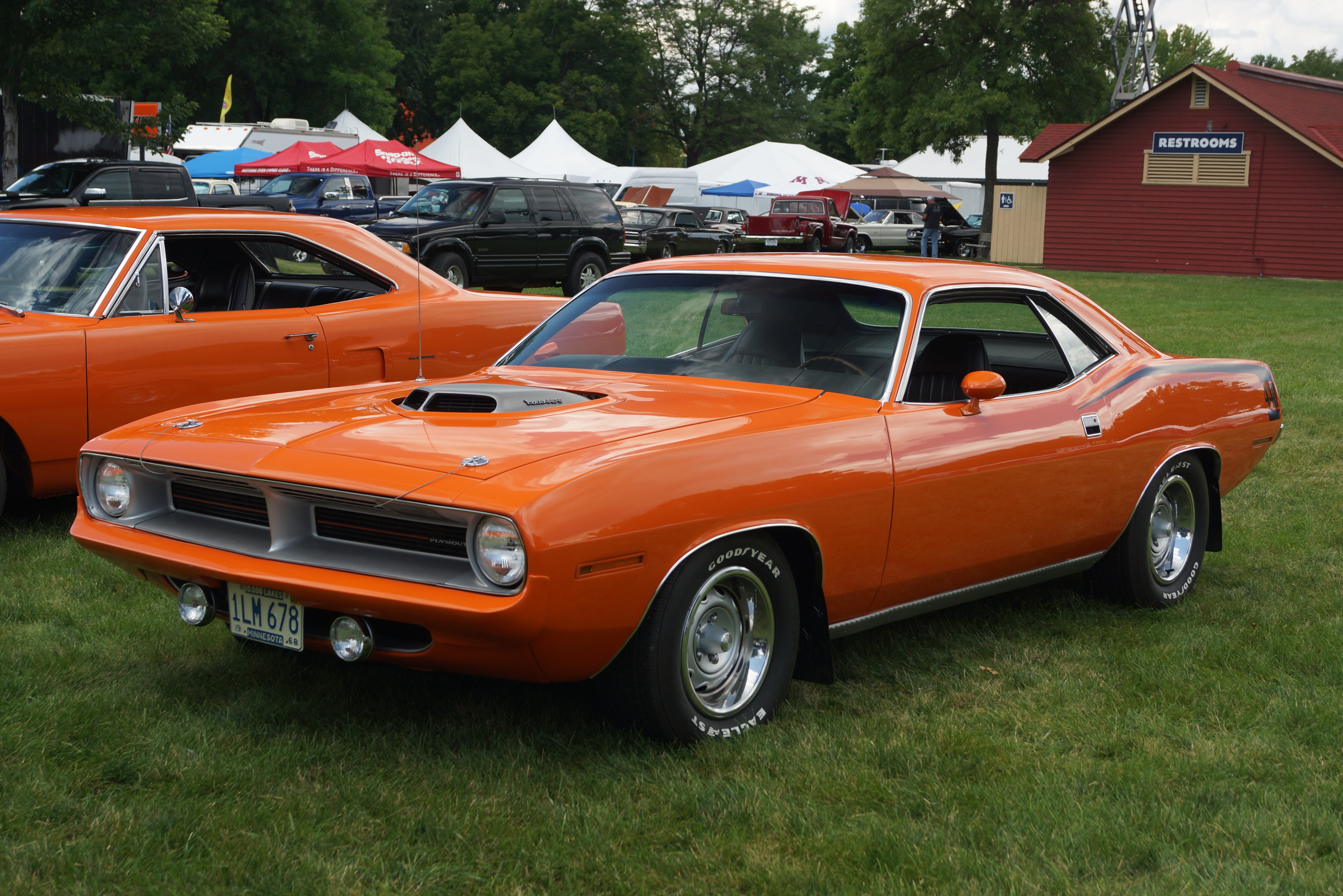
1970 Plymouth 'Cuda coupe

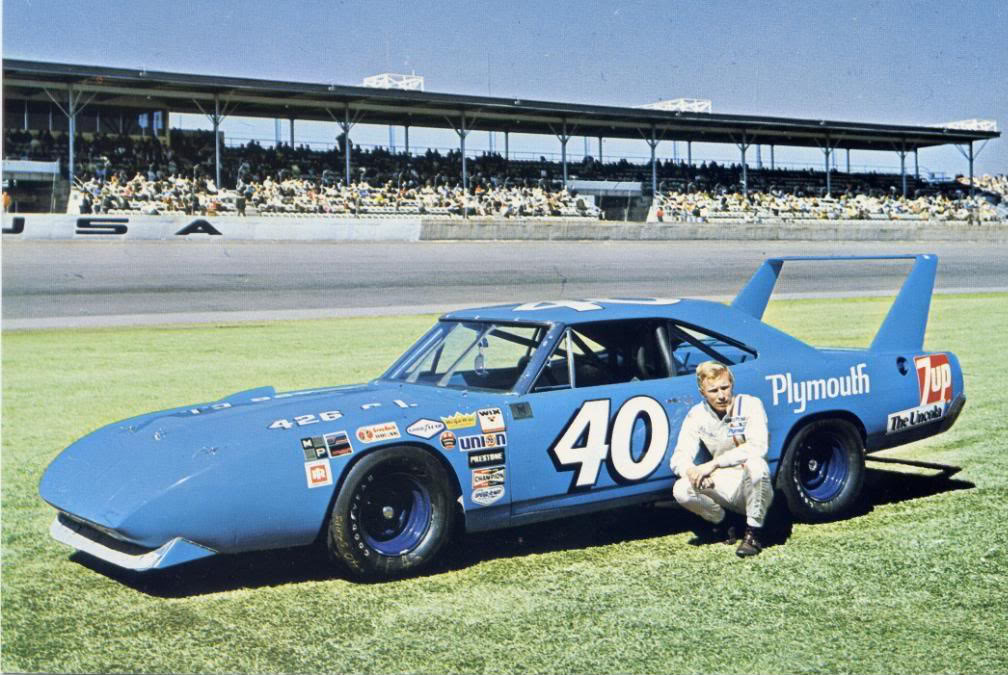
Pete Hamilton with Petty Enterprises 1970 Plymouth Superbird

1973 Plymouth Satellite Sebring

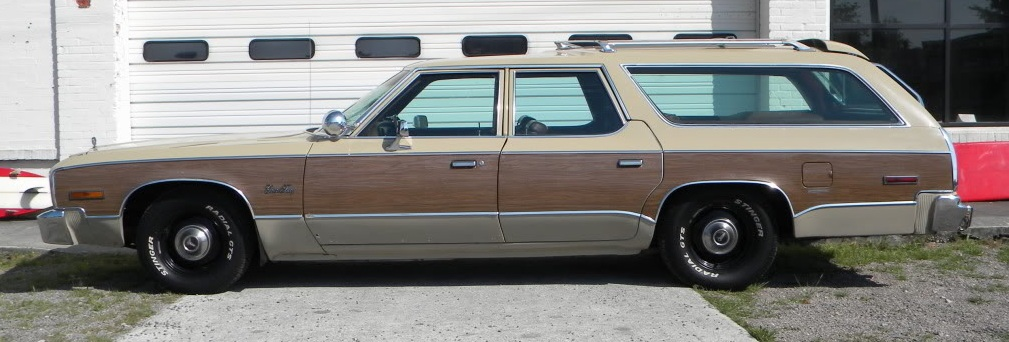
Gran Fury Sport Suburban 1977

By the 1970s, emissions and safety regulations, along with soaring gasoline prices and an economic downturn, meant demand dropped for all muscle-type models. As with other American vehicles of the time, there was a progressive decrease in the Barracuda's performance. To meet increasingly stringent safety and exhaust emission regulations, big-block engine options were discontinued. The remaining engines were detuned year by year to reduce exhaust emissions, which also reduced their power output. There was also an increase in weight as bumpers became larger and, starting in 1970, E-body doors were equipped with heavy steel side-impact protection beams. Higher fuel prices and performance-car insurance surcharges deterred many buyers as the interest in high-performance cars waned. Sales of pony cars were on the decline. Sales had dropped dramatically after 1970, and while 1973 showed a sales uptick, Barracuda production ended April 1, 1974, ten years to the day after it had begun. The redesign for the 1970 Barracuda removed all its previous commonality with the Valiant. The original fastback design was deleted from the line and the Barracuda now consisted of coupe and convertible models. The all-new model, styled by John E. Herlitz, was built on a shorter, wider version of Chrysler's existing B platform, called the E-body. Sharing this platform was the newly launched Dodge Challenger; however, no exterior sheet metal interchanged between the two cars, and the Challenger, at 110 inches (2,794 mm), had a wheelbase that was 2 inches (51 mm) longer than the Barracuda.

The E-body Barracuda was now "able to shake the stigma of 'economy car'." Three versions were offered for 1970 and 1971: the base Barracuda (BH), the luxury oriented Gran Coupe (BP), and the sport model 'Cuda (BS). Beginning mid-year 1970, and ending with the 1971 model, there also was the Barracuda Coupe (A93), a low-end model that included the 198 cu in (3.2 L) Slant Six as a base engine, lower-grade interior, and (like other Coupe series Chrysler Corp. offered that year) had fixed quarter glass instead of roll-down rear passenger windows. The high-performance models were marketed as 'Cuda deriving from the 1969 option. The E-body's engine bay was larger than that of the previous A-body, facilitating the release of Chrysler's 426 cu in (7.0 L) Hemi for the regular retail market.

For 1970 and 1971, the Barracuda and Barracuda Gran Coupe had two six-cylinder engines available — a new 198 cu in (3.2 L) version of the slant-6, and the 225 — as well as three different V8s: a 318 cu in (5.2 L), as well as a 383 cu in (6.3 L) with a two-barrel carburetor and single exhaust and with a four-barrel carburetor and dual exhaust producing 330 hp (246 kW) SAE gross. The Cuda had the 383ci 335 hp (250 kW) SAE gross (same as Dodge's 383 Magnum) as the standard engine. Optional were the 440 cu in (7.2 L) with four-barrel carburetor "Super Commando" or the six-barrel "Super Commando Six Pak" as well as the 426 cu in (7.0 L) Hemi. The 440- and Hemi-equipped cars received upgraded suspension components and structural reinforcements to help transfer the power to the road.

In 1970, the power plant options offered to the customer were:

1. 275 hp (200 kW) SAE gross in the 340-4V.
2. 335 hp (250 kW) SAE gross in the high performance 383-4V,
3. 375 hp (280 kW) SAE gross in the 440-4V,
4. 390 hp (290 kW) SAE gross in the 440-6V, and
5. 425 hp (317 kW) SAE gross in the 426-8V.

Other Barracuda options included decal sets, hood modifications, and unusual "high impact" colors.

The compact Valiant sold well and built a reputation for attractive styling, durability, economy, and value. Although the Valiant hardtop was discontinued for 1967, it was reintroduced as a virtual clone of the Dodge Dart Swinger for 1971 under the model name "Valiant Scamp". The Scamp was produced along with the Valiant, Dodge Dart, and Swinger until 1976, when it was replaced with the Volaré. Featuring transverse-mounted torsion bars and a slightly larger body, the Volaré (and its Dodge twin, the Aspen) was an instant sales success. Available as coupe, sedan, or station wagon, the Volaré offered a smoother ride and better handling than the Dart/Valiant, but suffered quality control problems and by 1980, was selling poorly.

Realizing that front-wheel drive, four-cylinder engines, and rack-and-pinion steering would become the standards for the 1980s, Chrysler introduced a new compact car for 1978, the Plymouth Horizon/Dodge Omni twins, based on a Simca platform. Horizon sold well, but suffered from a scathing report by Consumer Reports, which found its handling dangerous in certain situations. Plymouth continued to sell the Horizon until 1987, when a variety of front-wheel drive compact cars made up the line. Big Plymouths, including the Fury and Gran Fury, were sold until the early 1980s, but mostly as fleet vehicles. While attempting to compete with Ford and Chevrolet for big-car sales, Plymouth was hurt by Chrysler's financial woes in the late 1970s, when both its competitors downsized their full-size models.

=== 1980s ===
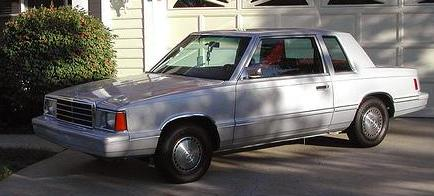
1983 Plymouth Reliant coupe

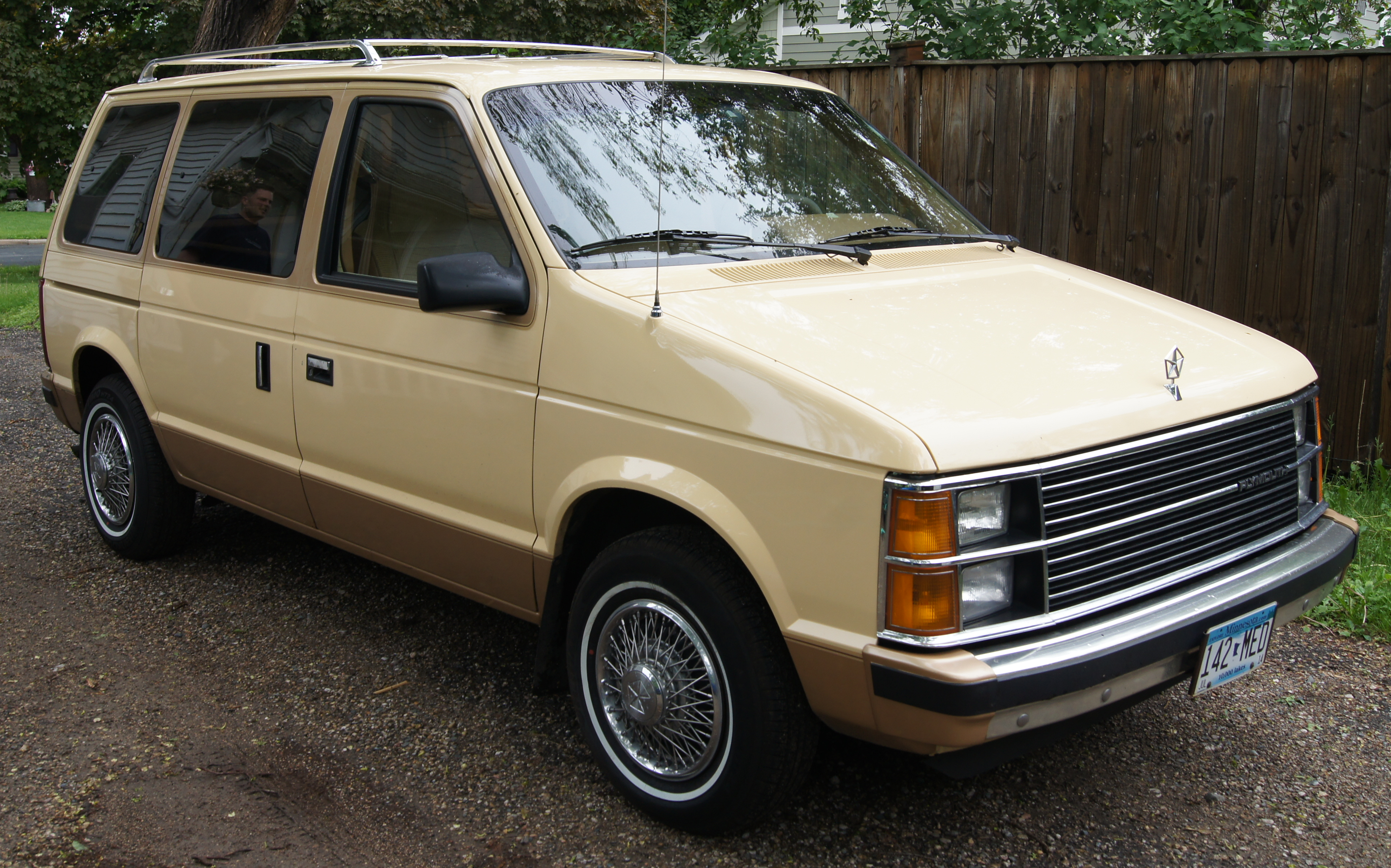
1985 Plymouth Voyager LE

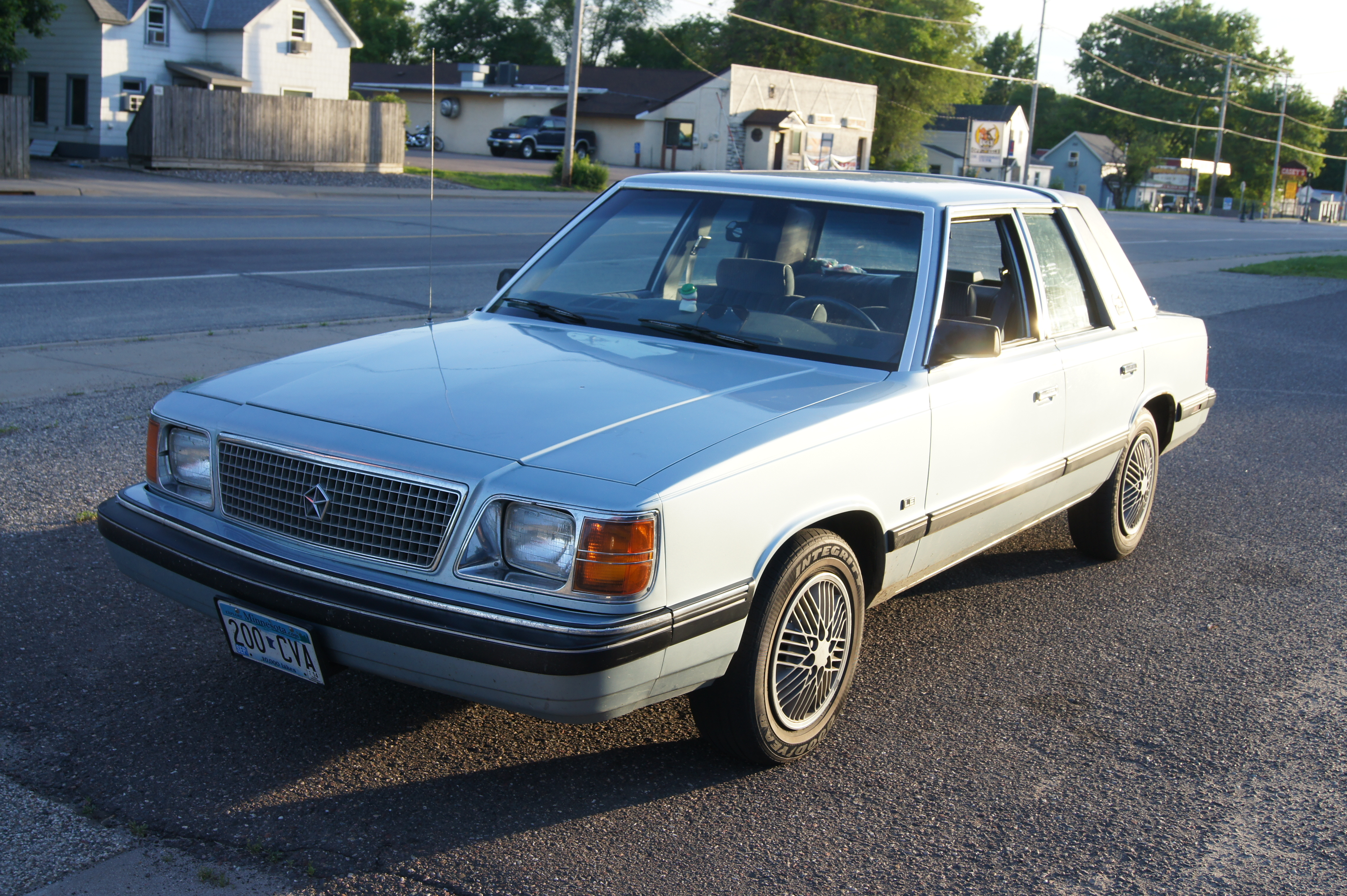
1988 Plymouth Reliant Exec Classic

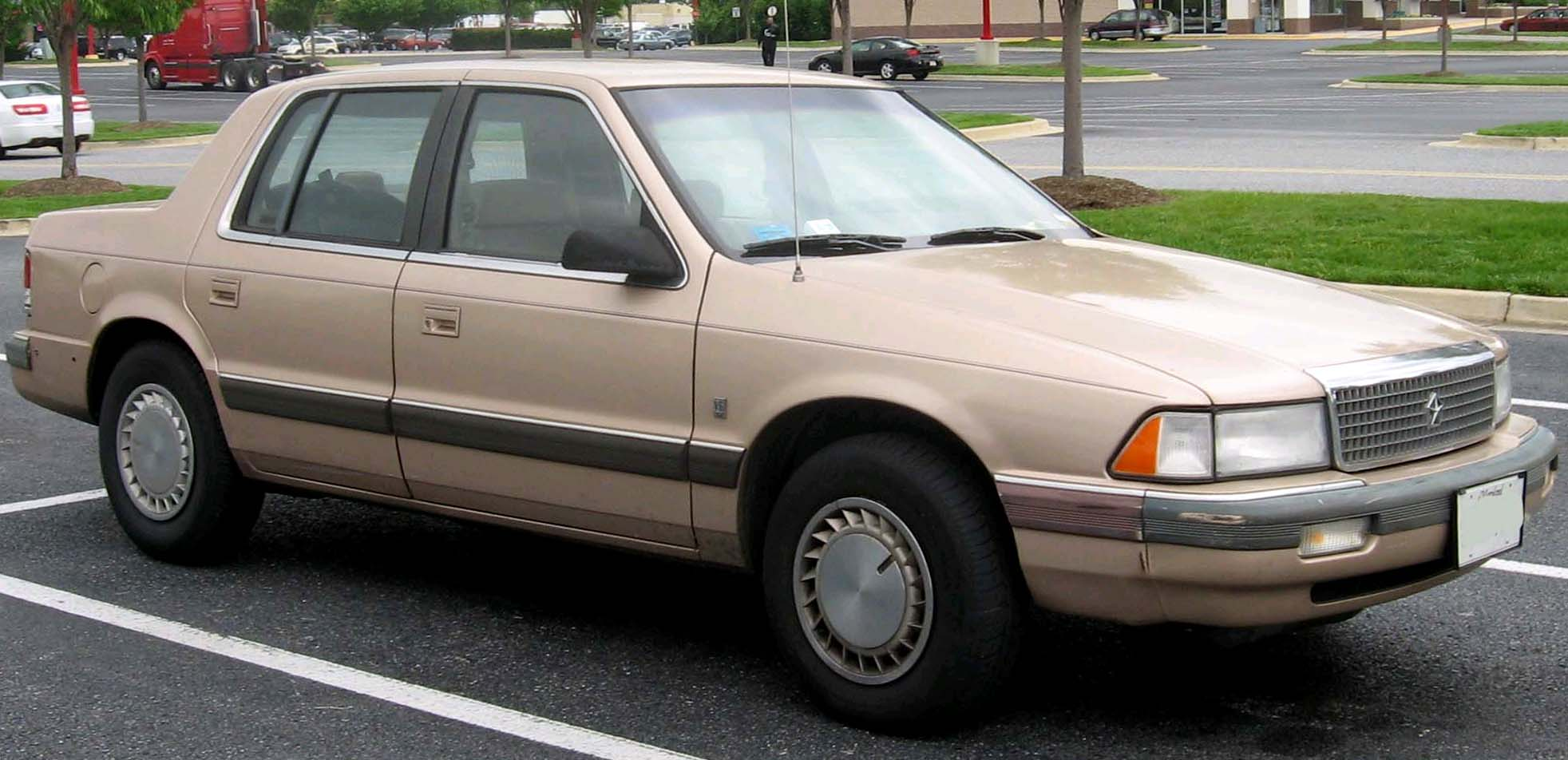
1989-1990 Plymouth Acclaim

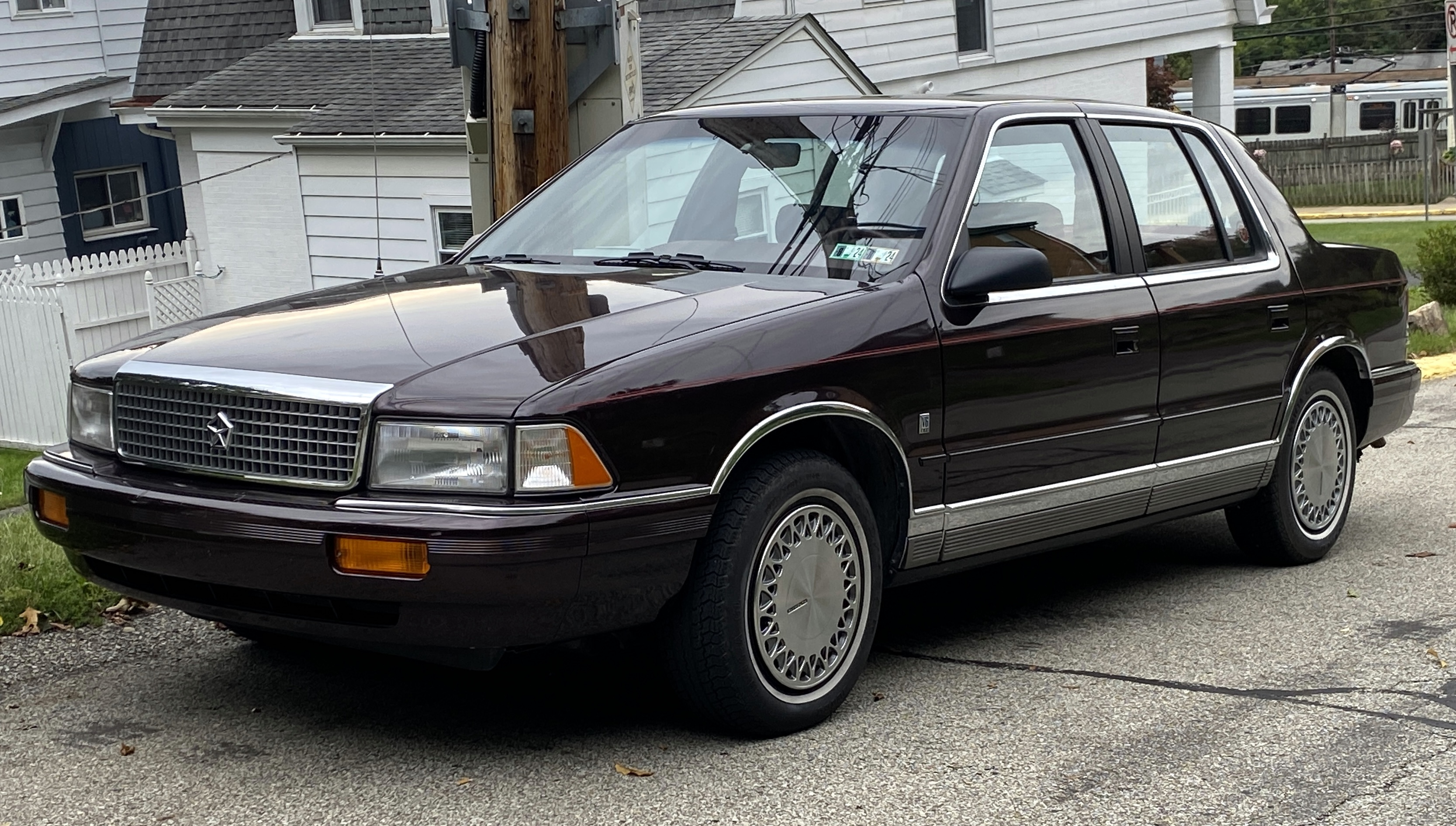
1989-1992 Plymouth Acclaim LE

Most Plymouth models, especially those offered from the 1970s onward, such as the Valiant, Volaré, and the Acclaim, were badge-engineered versions of Dodge or Mitsubishi models.

The Plymouth Reliant and Dodge Aries were introduced for the 1981 model year as the first "K-cars" manufactured and marketed by the Chrysler Corporation. The Reliant was available as a 2-door coupe, 4-door sedan, or as a 4-door station wagon, in three different trim lines: base, Custom, and SE ("Special Edition"). Station wagons came only in Custom or SE trim. Unlike many small cars, the K-cars retained the traditional 6-passenger 2-bench seat with a column shifter seating arrangement favored by many Americans. The Reliant was powered by a then-new 2.2 L I4 SOHC engine, with a Mitsubishi "Silent Shaft" 2.6 L as an option (curiously this engine also featured hemispherical combustion chambers, and all 1981 models equipped with it featured "HEMI" badges on the front fenders). Initial sales were brisk, with both Reliant and Aries each selling over 150,000 units in 1981. As rebadged variants, the Reliant and Aries were manufactured in Newark, Delaware, Detroit, Michigan, and Toluca, Mexico — in a single generation. After their introduction, the Reliant and Aries were marketed as the "Reliant K" and "Aries K".

The Reliant replaced the Plymouth Volaré/Road Runner. The Aries replaced the Dodge Aspen. The Reliant and Aries were classified by the EPA as mid-size and were the smallest cars to have 6-passenger seating with a 3-seat per row setup, similar to larger rear-wheel drive cars such as the Dodge Dart and other front-wheel drive cars such as the Chevrolet Celebrity. Chrysler marketed the car as being able to seat "six Americans." The Aries was sold as the Dart in Mexico. The Reliant and Aries were selected together as Motor Trend magazine's Car of the Year for 1981 and sold almost a million Aries and 1.1 million Reliant units over the nine-year run.

In 1982, Plymouth downsized the Gran Fury again, this time sharing the mid-size M platform with the Chrysler Fifth Avenue (called Chrysler New Yorker/New Yorker Fifth Avenue for 1982 and 1983) and the Dodge Diplomat. In addition to the R-body Gran Fury, the M-body Gran Fury replaced the M-body Chrysler LeBaron, which had moved to the compact K platform that year. Now considered a mid-sized car, this generation Gran Fury was close to the exterior size of what was once the compact Valiant and Volaré but offered more interior room. The M-body was in fact heavily based on the Volaré's F platform. Like its predecessor, the 1982 Gran Fury was introduced later than its Chrysler and Dodge siblings; the Chrysler LeBaron and Dodge Diplomat had used the M-body since 1977. 1982-1989 Plymouth Gran Furys shared the Dodge Diplomat's front and rear fascias. They were virtually identical with the exception of badging. Once again, the third generation Gran Fury was available in base and higher-end "Salon" trim. As in previous years, the higher-volume Gran Fury base model catered more towards fleet customers while Gran Fury Salons were geared more towards private customers and offered options such as full vinyl roofs, velour upholstery, turbine-spoke wheels, power windows, and power locks. Although available to private retail customers, the M-body Gran Fury was far more popular with police departments and other fleet customers, primarily since the car was reasonably priced and had a conventional drivetrain with proven components that could withstand a good deal of abuse. This generation of the Gran Fury sold in respectable numbers. However, despite having the same base prices as the Gran Fury (just under $12,000 USD for their final year), the Diplomat always outsold it, usually by several thousand units each year. The Chrysler Fifth Avenue's total sales were always more than that of the Gran Fury and Diplomat by far, even though it generally cost about $6,000 more. This was the last car to carry the Gran Fury nameplate, but it remained largely unchanged for its 7-year run. Declining sales, a lack of promotion, and technical obsolescence—the platform dated back to the 1976 Plymouth Volare and Dodge Aspen—eventually contributed to the model's demise in early 1989. That year, a driver-side airbag became standard; this would be the last RWD Plymouth until the introduction of the Prowler. While Dodge offered the 1990 Monaco, and later the 1993 Intrepid, Chrysler never replaced the Gran Fury with any other large car in the remainder of Plymouth's lineup on through to its demise in the 2001 model year.

In 1984, Chrysler marketed the rebadged Plymouth variant of its new minivan as the Voyager, using the Chrysler's S platform, derived from the K-platform (Plymouth Reliant and Dodge Aries). The Voyager shared components with the K-cars including portions of the interior, e.g., the Reliant's instrument cluster and dashboard controls, along with the K-platform front-wheel drive layout and low floor, giving the Voyager a car-like ease of entry. The Voyager was on Car and Driver magazine's Ten Best list for 1985.

For 1987, the Voyager received minor cosmetic updates as well as the May 1987 introduction of the Grand Voyager, which was built on a longer wheelbase adding more cargo room. It was available only with SE or LE trim. First-generation Voyager minivans were offered in three trim levels: an unnamed base model, mid-grade SE, and high-end LE, the latter bearing simulated woodgrain paneling. A sportier LX model was added in 1989, sharing much of its components with the Caravan ES. Safety features included 3-point seat belts for the front two passengers and lap belts for the rear passengers. Standard on all Voyagers were legally mandated side-impact reinforcements for all seating front and rear outboard positions, but airbags or ABS were not available. Notably, the Voyager, along with the Dodge Caravan, are considered to be the first mass-produced vehicles to have dedicated built-in cup holders. Original commercials for the 1984 Voyager featured magician Doug Henning as a spokesperson to promote the Voyager "Magic Wagon's" versatility, cargo space, low step-in height, passenger volume, and maneuverability. Later commercials in 1989 featured rock singer Tina Turner. Canadian commercials in 1990 featured pop singer Celine Dion.

For 1987, which was the Sundance's first year, it was available in a single base model. For 1988, a higher-end RS model was available. The RS model, which stood for Rally Sport, came with standard features that included two-tone paint, fog lights, and a leather-wrapped steering wheel. It was also available with a turbocharged 2.2 L I4 engine, and other amenities like an Infinity sound system, tinted window glass, and dual power mirrors. For 1991, the base model split into two distinct models: entry-level America and mid-level Highline, in addition to the high-end RS. The stripped-down America had previously been offered for the Plymouth Horizon's final year in 1990.

The AA-body cars were badge-engineered triplets, as were most Chrysler products of this time. The Acclaim differed from its siblings primarily in wheel choices, bodyside molding, and fascias where it sported its unique taillights and the corporate Plymouth eggcrate-grille. Like the K-body and E-body vehicles they replaced, the Acclaim and Dodge Spirit were both marketed as mainstream variants, while the Chrysler LeBaron was marketed as the luxury variant. Despite this, there was substantial overlap in trims and equipment among each car. For example, a fully loaded Acclaim was almost similar to a base LeBaron in features and price.

In addition to its entry-level base model, the Acclaim was initially available in mid-range LE and high-end LX trim. The LE and LX models came equipped with features such as premium cloth seating, power windows/door locks, premium sound systems, bodyside cladding, additional exterior brightwork, and on the latter 15-inch lace-spoke aluminum wheels. In spite of this, the base model accounted for nearly 85 percent of Acclaim sales. Unlike the Spirit, the Acclaim did not receive any sport-oriented models. The Acclaim has also been characterized as the replacement for the smaller Reliant, though the Sundance launched in 1987 is closer than the Acclaim in most dimensions to the Reliant.

=== Final years: 1990s–2001 ===
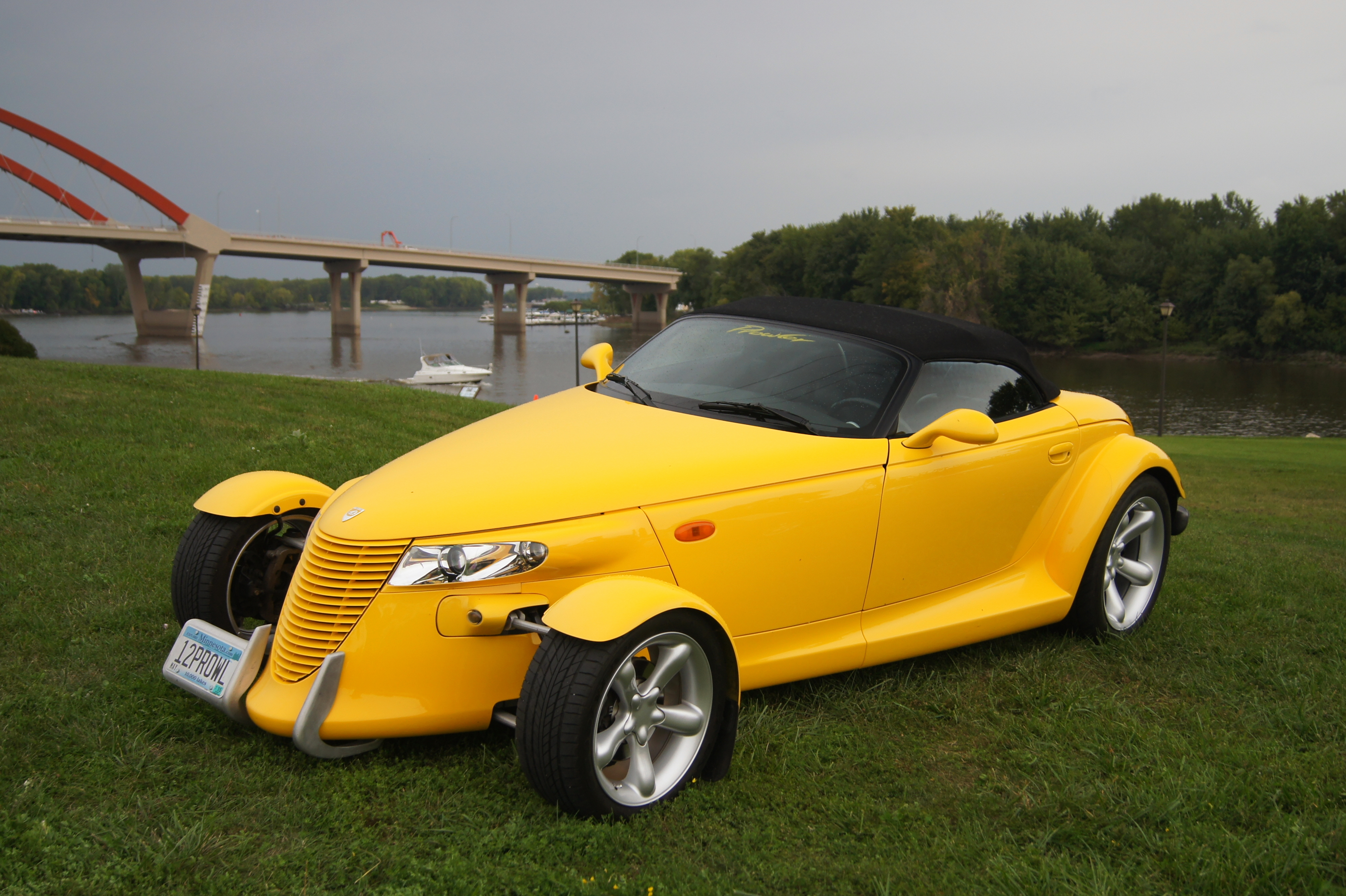
1999 Plymouth Prowler

By the 1990s, Plymouth had lost much of its identity, as its models continued to overlap in features and prices with its sister brands, Dodge and Eagle. Chrysler attempted to remedy this by repositioning Plymouth to its traditional target market as the automaker's entry-level brand. This included giving Plymouth its own new sailboat logo and advertisements that focused solely on value. However, this only further narrowed Plymouth's product offerings and buyer appeal, and sales continued to fall.

Chrysler considered giving Plymouth a variant of the highly successful new-for-1993 full-size LH platform, which would have been called the Accolade, but decided against it. By the late 1990s, only four vehicles were sold under the Plymouth name: the Voyager/Grand Voyager minivans, the Breeze mid-size sedan, the Neon compact car, and the Prowler sports car, which was to be the last model unique to Plymouth, though the Chrysler PT Cruiser was conceived as a concept unique to Plymouth before production commenced as a Chrysler model.

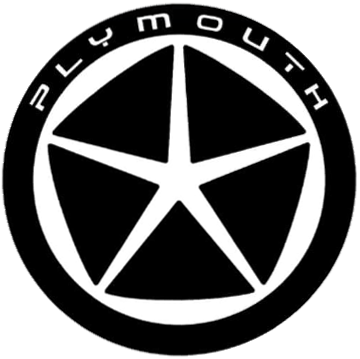
1994–96 logo

After discontinuing the Eagle brand in 1998, Chrysler was planning to expand the Plymouth line with a number of unique models before the corporation's merger with Daimler-Benz AG. The first model was the Plymouth Prowler, a hot rod-styled sports car. The PT Cruiser was to have been the second. Both models had similar front-end styling, suggesting Chrysler intended a retro styling theme for the Plymouth brand. At the time of Daimler's takeover of Chrysler, Plymouth had no models besides the Prowler not also offered in a similar version by Dodge.

From a peak production of 973,000 for the 1973 model year, Plymouth rarely exceeded 200,000 cars per year after 1990. Even the Voyager sales were usually less than 50% of that of the Dodge Caravan. In Canada, the Plymouth name was defunct at the end of the 1999 model year. Consequently, DaimlerChrysler decided to drop the make after a limited run of 2001 models. This was announced on November 3, 1999.

The last new model sold under the Plymouth marque was the second-generation Neon for 2000. The PT Cruiser was ultimately launched as a Chrysler, and the Prowler and Voyager were absorbed into that make, as well. Following the 2001 model year, the Neon was sold only as a Dodge in the US, though it remained available as a Chrysler in Canadian and other markets. The Plymouth Breeze was dropped after 2000, before Chrysler introduced their redesigned 2001 Dodge Stratus and Chrysler Sebring sedan.

== Timeline ==
A 1949 Plymouth Special DeLuxe Station Wagon, advertisement

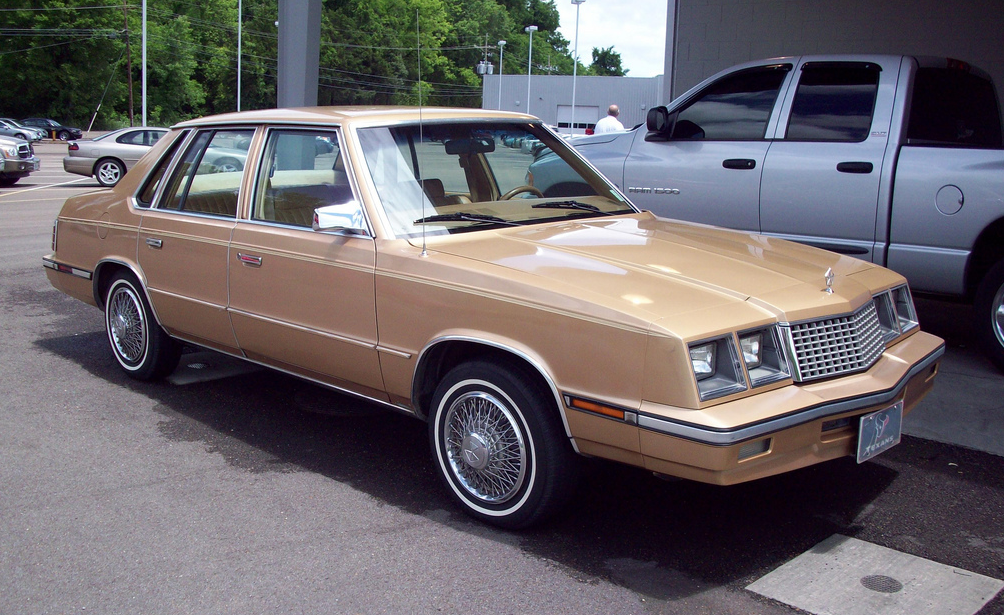
1984-1985 Plymouth Caravelle

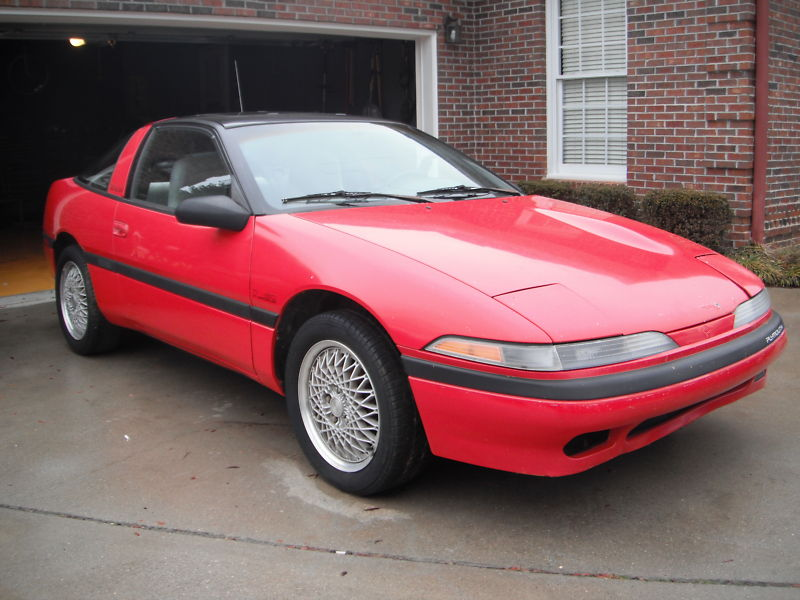
1990 Plymouth Laser

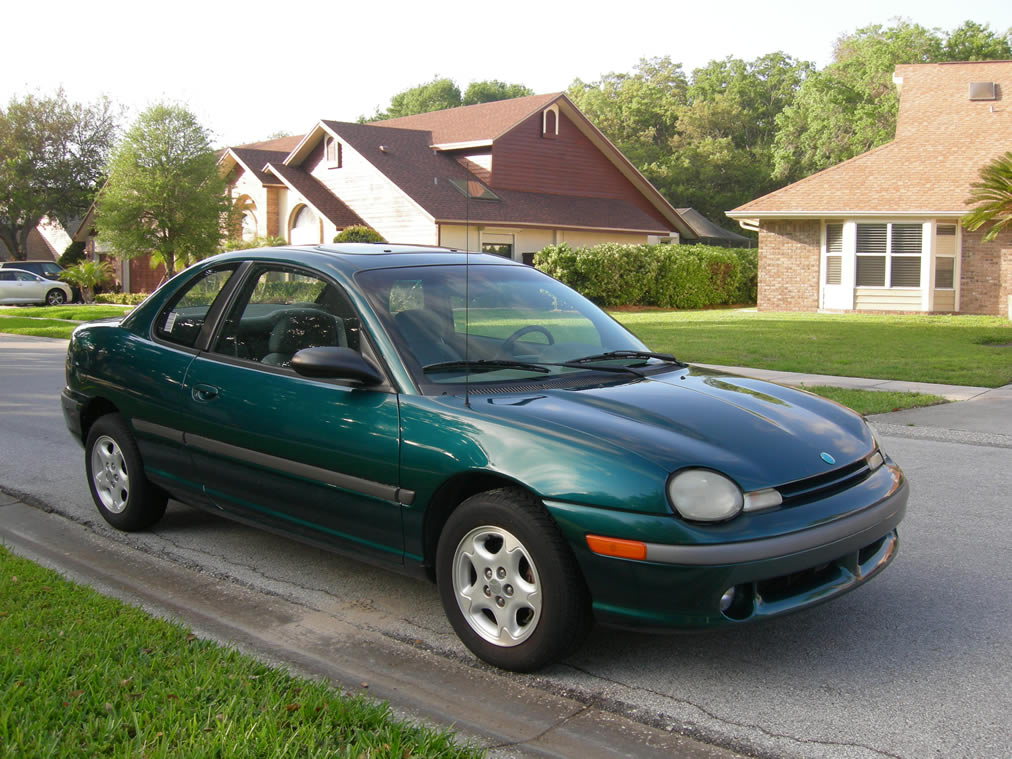
1995 Plymouth Neon

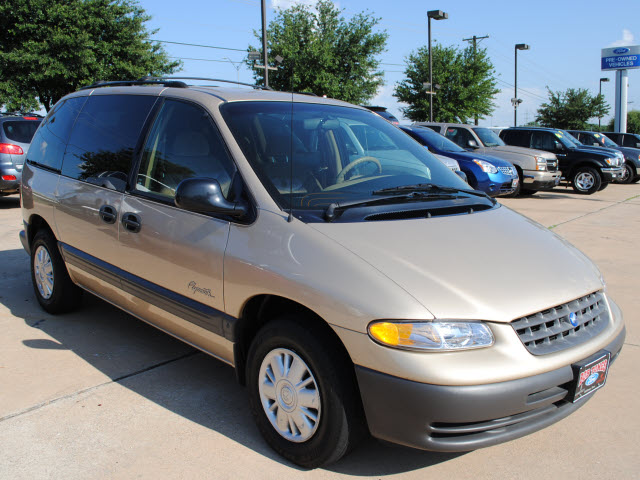
1998 Plymouth Voyager

The last Plymouth built, 2001

- 1955: Plymouth first offered a V8 engine. Plymouth and the other Chrysler divisions received "The New 100-Million Dollar Look".
- 1956: The automatic three-speed TorqueFlite transmission was introduced on some premium models. The Plymouth Fury was introduced.
- 1957: As with all other Chrysler divisions, the Forward Look design made its debut on the 1957 Plymouths. Torsion-Aire front suspension was introduced on all models.
- 1960: Dodge introduced the smaller, lower-priced Dart model that competed directly with Plymouth's offerings. The new compact Valiant was introduced as a marque unto itself. All Plymouths now featured unit-body construction. A new base "Slant-6" engine was introduced with a 30-degree slant and overhead valves.
- 1961: Valiant was repositioned as a Plymouth model for the US market; Dodge got the badge-engineered Lancer version. Rambler and then Pontiac assumed third place in industry sales for the remainder of the 1960s.
- 1962: Sales dropped dramatically with the introduction of a line of unpopularly styled, downsized full-sized models.
- 1963: Valiant received a new, trim body resulting in a significant increase in sales. Full-sized models were restyled to look larger.
- 1964: The new Barracuda fastback coupe was introduced in April. Full-sized models were restyled with a new "slantback" hardtop coupe roofline.
- 1965: Plymouth rejoined the full-sized car market with the new Fury, based on the Chrysler C-body. The intermediate B-body model line became the Belvedere and Satellite for 1965. Push-button automatic transmission controls were replaced with a conventional column- or floor-mounted lever.
- 1967: The GTX was introduced.
- 1968: The Road Runner entered the Plymouth line-up.
- 1970: Duster coupe was introduced in the Valiant line for 1970 as well as the new E-body Barracuda.
- 1971: The British Hillman Avenger was imported as the Plymouth Cricket; it was discontinued in mid-1973. The new Valiant Scamp two-door hardtop was a badge-engineered Dodge Dart Swinger.
- 1973: Plymouth production hit an all-time peak of 973,000. The Plymouth Cricket in Canada was now based on the Dodge Colt.
- 1974: The full-sized Plymouth Voyager van, based on the similar Dodge B-series van, and Trail Duster SUV, based on the Dodge Ramcharger, were introduced. The Dodge Dart and Plymouth Valiant were, for the first time, different only in name and minor trim details (grille and tail lamps) as the two cars now shared the same 111-inch wheelbase (both divisions' fastbacks remain 108 in). The Barracuda was discontinued 10 years to the day it began production on April 1.
- 1975: The car that was to become the 1975 Plymouth Sebring was instead released as the new Chrysler Cordoba.
- 1976: The Volaré was launched, and the Valiant was discontinued at year-end.
- 1977: The large Gran Fury was discontinued.
- 1978: The mid-sized Fury was discontinued at the end of the model year. The subcompact Horizon was introduced. Chrysler Canada introduced the Plymouth Caravelle based on the Dodge Diplomat.
- 1979–1980: Chrysler made several thousand more Dodges than Plymouths for the first time (404,266 to 372,449 in 1979 and 308,638 to 290,974 in 1980). More Plymouths would be made than Dodges for 1981 and 1982, but from then on, there would always be more Dodges made than Plymouths.
- 1980: The Newport-based Gran Fury (R-body) was introduced. This was the last year for the Volaré and Road Runner.
- 1981: The Plymouth Reliant K was introduced. The full-sized Gran Fury sedan and Trail Duster SUV were discontinued.
- 1982: The mid-sized Plymouth Gran Fury, a Dodge Diplomat with a Plymouth grille, was introduced in the United States.
- 1983: The subcompact Plymouth Scamp pickup, based on the Dodge Rampage, was introduced and sold for one year only. The Caravelle four-door sedan based on the E-body and a two-door coupe based on the K-body were introduced in Canada. The sporty subcompact Horizon TC3 was renamed Turismo. The full-sized Voyager van was discontinued.
- 1984: The Voyager minivan and Mitsubishi-based Colt Vista multi-purpose vehicle (MPV) were introduced.
- 1985: The E-body Plymouth Caravelle was introduced in the United States.
- 1987: The compact P-body Plymouth Sundance entered the line-up with three- and five-door hatchbacks. The Turismo was discontinued, and the five-door Horizon was rebranded "Horizon America" with the most popular options made standard equipment with the less-popular ones dropped, along with a substantial price cut.
- 1987.5: The Grand Voyager, an extended wheelbase version of the preexisting Voyager, is introduced.
- 1989: The mid-sized Gran Fury (Caravelle in Canada), as well as the Reliant, were discontinued after this model year. The Reliant and E-body Caravelle are replaced by the Acclaim.
- 1990: The Mitsubishi-based Plymouth Laser sport-compact was introduced. The L-body Horizon was discontinued.
- 1991: The second generation of the Voyager/Grand Voyager is introduced.
- 1992: The higher-priced Acclaim models were repositioned as entry trim Chrysler LeBarons. Total sales of Acclaim and LeBaron dropped. Total 1993 Plymouth model-year production dropped to 159,775, along with 237,875 Voyager models. Dodge built 300,666 Caravans alone, and 263,539 non-Caravan models.
- 1994: The little-advertised Laser and the popular Sundance and Colt compacts all end production. They are replaced by a single car, the Neon, a car that Chrysler decided to offer as a Plymouth after dealers protested the loss of the Sundance and Colt with no replacement.
- 1995: Plymouth's lineup was at its all-time low, with just three cars: the Acclaim, the Neon, and the Voyager/Grand Voyager. The number went up to four in 1997, with the introduction of the Prowler, but never got any higher.
- 1996: Chrysler announced the new Plymouth Breeze six months after sister Dodge Stratus and Chrysler Cirrus models. Chrysler originally had no plans to replace the Acclaim model. In an attempt to move Plymouth downmarket, Chrysler made the redesigned Voyager only available in base and mid-level SE models. All of the higher-end trim levels available on the previous generation were now only found on the Dodge Caravan. The high-end trim levels could still be found in certain markets outside the US.
- 1997: Production for the 1997 model year was 178,807 cars plus 187,347 Voyager models. Dodge built 448,394 cars and 355,400 Caravans.
- 1999: Total 1999 production for Plymouth cars was 195,714 with Dodge at 394,052. Voyager production numbered 197,020, compared to 354,641 Caravans. The redesigned 2000 Neon became the brand's last new model.
- 2000: The mid-sized Breeze ended production. This was also the last year for the Voyager minivan as a Plymouth. All 2000 Voyagers built in December 1999 and beyond were badged as Chrysler Voyagers. In Canada, the redesigned Neon was sold under the Chrysler name and both the Plymouth and Dodge names were dropped on all car models, save for the Prowler and Viper. The Voyager name was dropped in Canada as all Chrysler dealers sold Dodge trucks, including the Caravan. Total 2000 model year production for Plymouth was 108,546 compared to 459,988 Dodge cars. Voyager production totaled 123,869 versus 330,370 Caravan models.
- 2001: In Plymouth's final model year, only the Neon remained. The Prowler and the Voyager became Chryslers. The Voyager gained a high-end LX trim, as well as a base eC trim, and it retained the SE trim. The Breeze was dropped as Chrysler issued the Chrysler Sebring sedan to replace the Chrysler Cirrus. The PT Cruiser was launched as a Chrysler, though it was originally planned to be a Plymouth. The final Plymouth, a Neon, was assembled on June 28, 2001, at the Belvidere Assembly Plant, with a total of 38,657 built for the model year.

== Plymouth car models ==
Plymouth models included:
- Plymouth Model 30U (1930)
- Plymouth Acclaim (1989–1995)
- Plymouth Arrow (1976–1980, rebadged Mitsubishi Lancer Celeste)
- Plymouth Arrow Truck (1979–1982, rebadged Mitsubishi Forte)
- Plymouth Barracuda (1964–1974)
- Plymouth Belvedere (1954–1970)
- Plymouth Breeze (1996–2000)
- Plymouth Business (1935–1938)
- Plymouth Caravelle (1985–1988)
- Plymouth Cambridge (1951–1953)
- Plymouth Champ (1979–1982, rebadged Mitsubishi Mirage)
- Plymouth Colt (1983–1994, rebadged Mitsubishi Mirage)
- Plymouth Colt Vista (1984–1994, rebadged Mitsubishi Chariot)
- Plymouth Commercial Car (1937–1941)
- Plymouth Concord (1951–1952)
- Plymouth Conquest (1984–1986, rebadged Mitsubishi Starion)
- Plymouth Cranbrook (1951–1953)
- Plymouth Cricket (1971–1975, rebadged Hillman Avenger)
- Plymouth Deluxe (1933–1942, 1946–1950)
  - Plymouth Special Deluxe (1941–1942, 1946–1950)
- Plymouth Duster (1970–1976)
- Plymouth Fury (1956–1978)
  - Plymouth Sport Fury (1959, 1962–1971)
  - Plymouth VIP (1966–1969)
- Plymouth Gran Fury (1975–1977, 1980–1989)
- Plymouth Grand Voyager (1987–2000)
- Plymouth GTX (1967–1971)
- Plymouth Horizon (1978–1990)
- Plymouth Laser (1990–1994, rebadged Mitsubishi Eclipse)
- Plymouth Model PA (1931)
- Plymouth Model Q (1928)
- Plymouth Model U (1929)
- Plymouth Neon (1994–2001)
- Plymouth Plaza (1954–1958)
- Plymouth Prowler (1997 and 1999–2001)
- Plymouth Reliant (1981–1989)
- Plymouth Roadking (1938–1941)
- Plymouth Road Runner (1968–1975)
- Plymouth Sapporo (1978–1983, rebadged Mitsubishi Galant Lambda)
- Plymouth Satellite (1966–1974)
- Plymouth Savoy (1951–1964)
- Plymouth Scamp (1983)
- Plymouth Six (1934)
- Plymouth Special Six (1934)
- Plymouth Standard (1933, 1935)
- Plymouth Sundance (1987–1994)
- Plymouth Suburban (1949–1961)
- Plymouth Superbird (1970)
- Plymouth TC3 (1979–1982)
- Plymouth Trail Duster (1974–1981)
- Plymouth Turismo (1983–1987)
- Plymouth Valiant (1960–1976)
  - Plymouth Scamp (1971-1976)
- Plymouth Volaré (1976–1980)
  - Plymouth Road Runner (1976–1980)
- Plymouth Voyager (1974–2000)

== Plymouth trucks ==
Plymouth built various trucks and vans over the years, mainly rebadged Dodge or Chrysler vehicles. Early pickups, delivery trucks, and other commercial trucks were available, and later an SUV, full-sized vans, and minivans. Plymouth had supplied components to the Fargo vehicles, another member of the Chrysler family, but entered the commercial market in 1937 with the PT50.

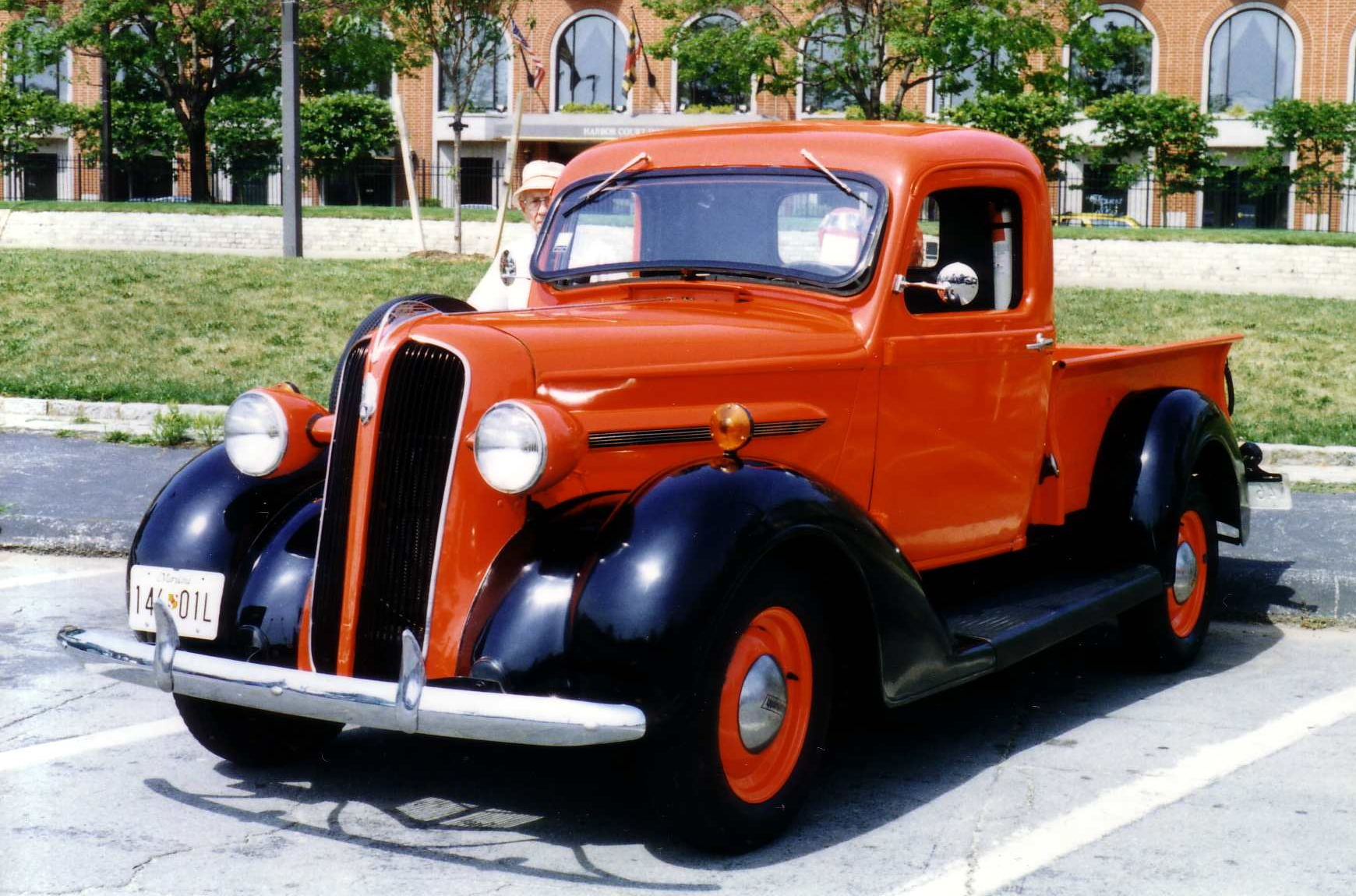
1937 Express pickup

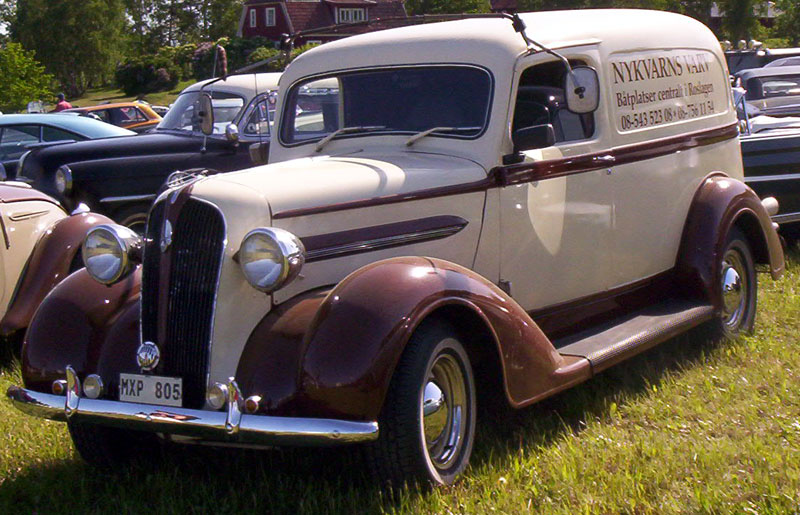
1937 PT50 delivery truck

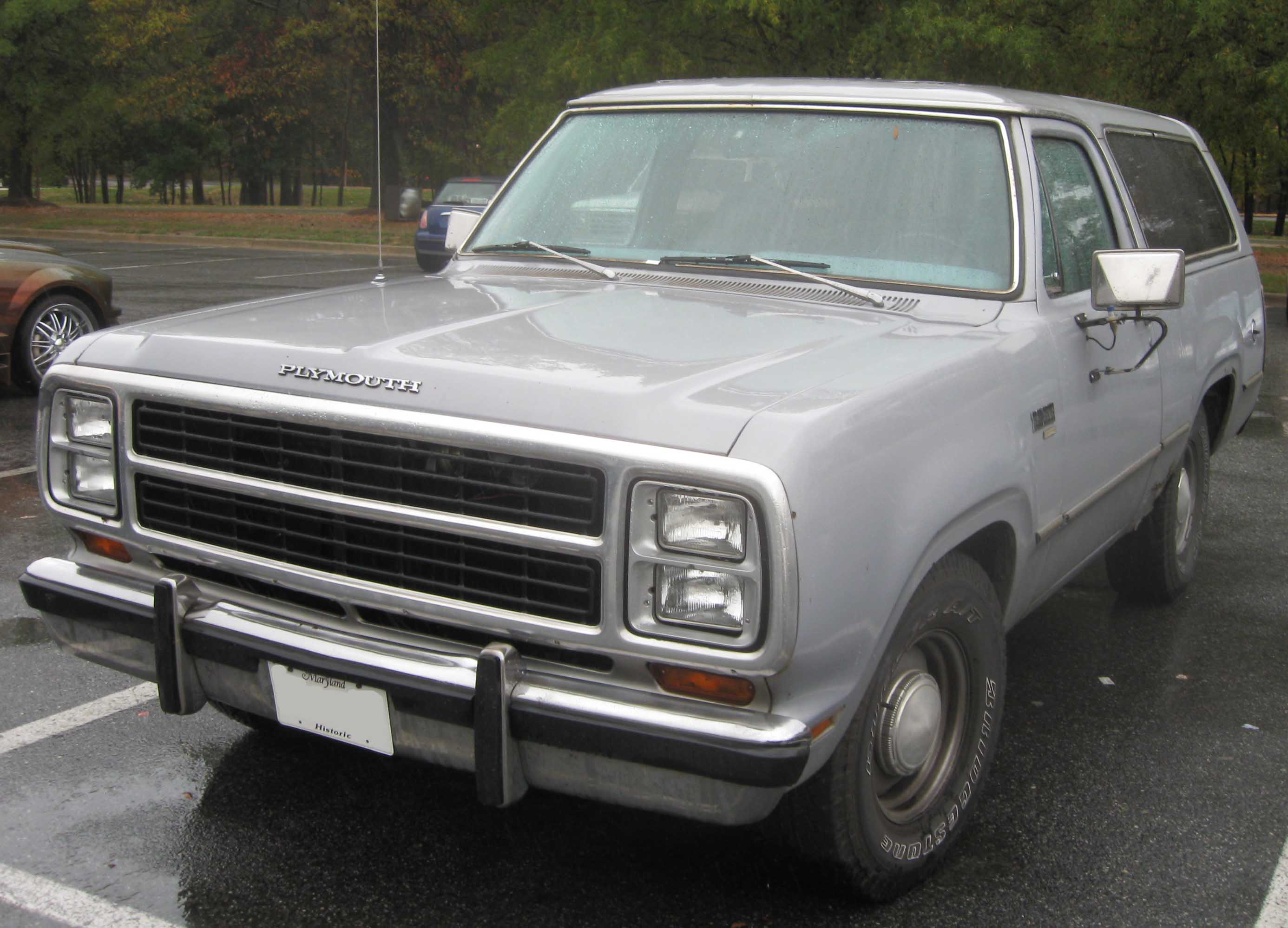
1979 Trail Duster

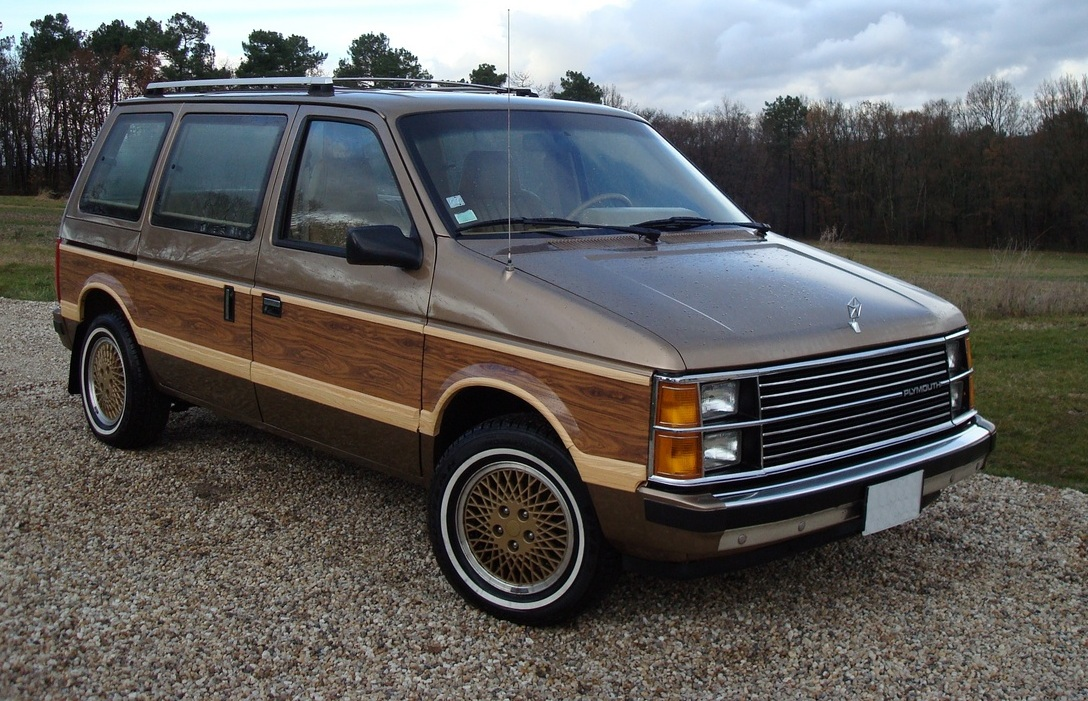
1985 Voyager LE

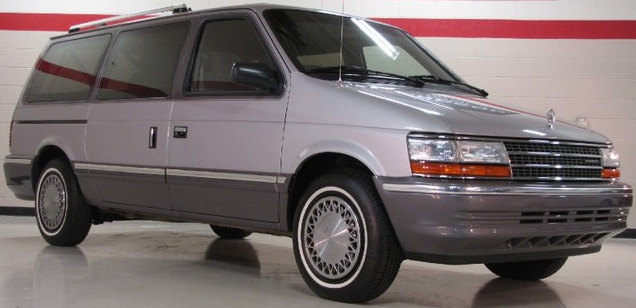
1991 Grand Voyager LE

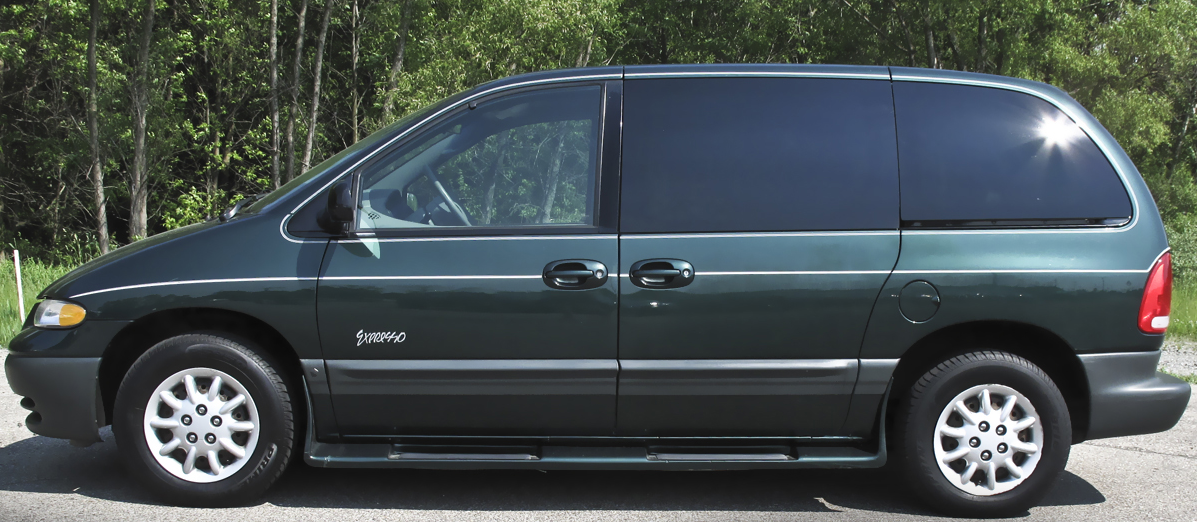
1998 Voyager Expresso

=== Truck models ===
- Plymouth PT50 - 1937 - Express pickup, panel delivery van, cab, and chassis, as well as station wagon
- Plymouth PT57 - 1938 - Express pickup, panel delivery van, cab, and chassis
- Plymouth PT81 - 1939 - Express pickup, cab, and chassis
- Plymouth PT105 - 1940 - Express pickup
- Plymouth PT125 - 1941 - Express pickup
- Plymouth Trail Duster - 1974-1981 - SUV, same as Dodge Ramcharger
- Plymouth Voyager (van) - 1974-1983 - full-sized van, same as Dodge Sportsman
- Plymouth Scamp - 1983 - front-wheel-drive pickup, same as Dodge Rampage
- Plymouth Voyager (minivan) - 1984-2000 - minivan, same as Dodge Caravan and Chrysler Town & Country; also sold as Chrysler Voyager from 1999 to 2003
- Plymouth Arrow Truck - 1979-1982 - compact pickup built by Mitsubishi

== Plymouth concept cars ==
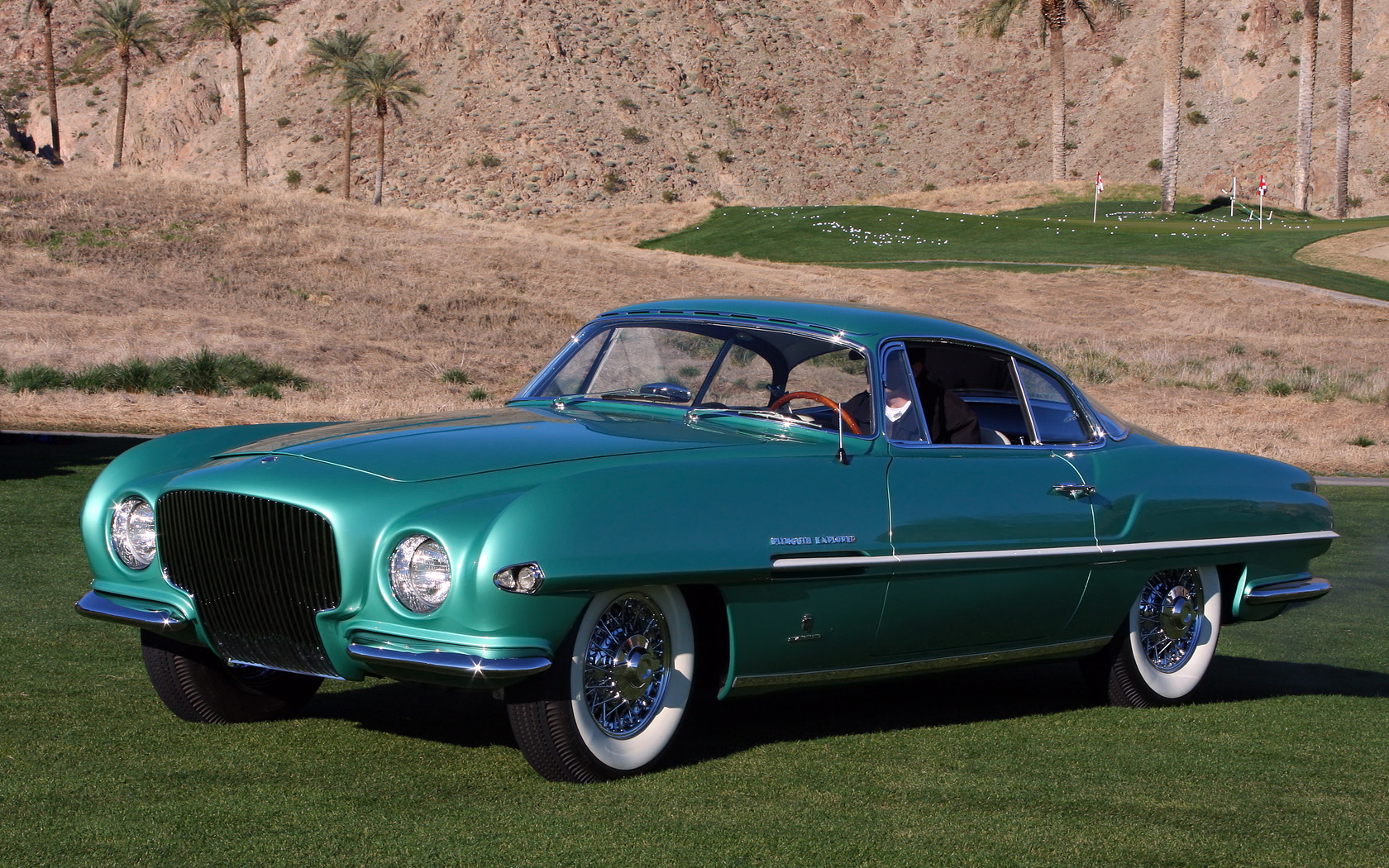
1954 Plymouth Explorer

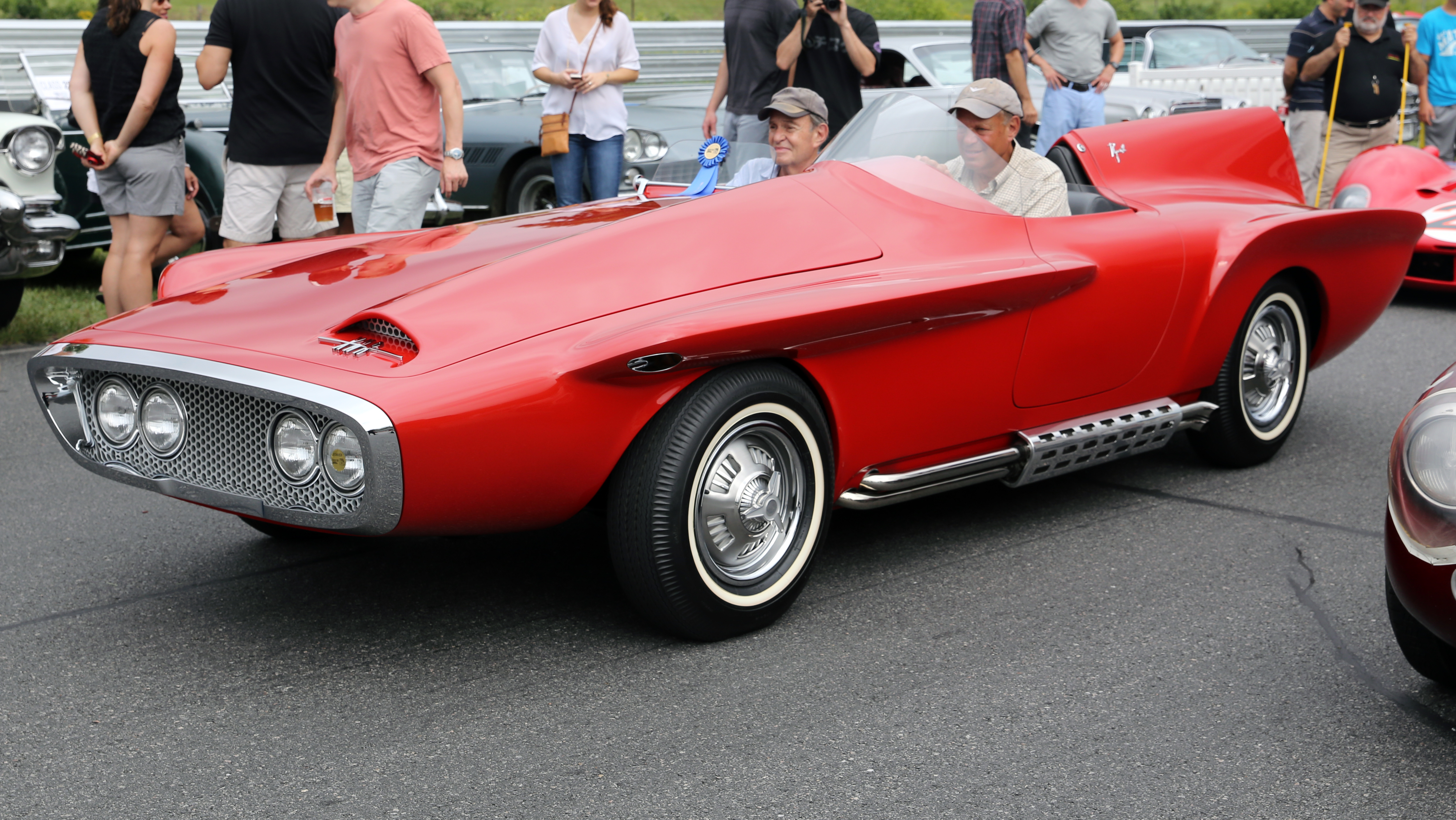
1960 Plymouth XNR

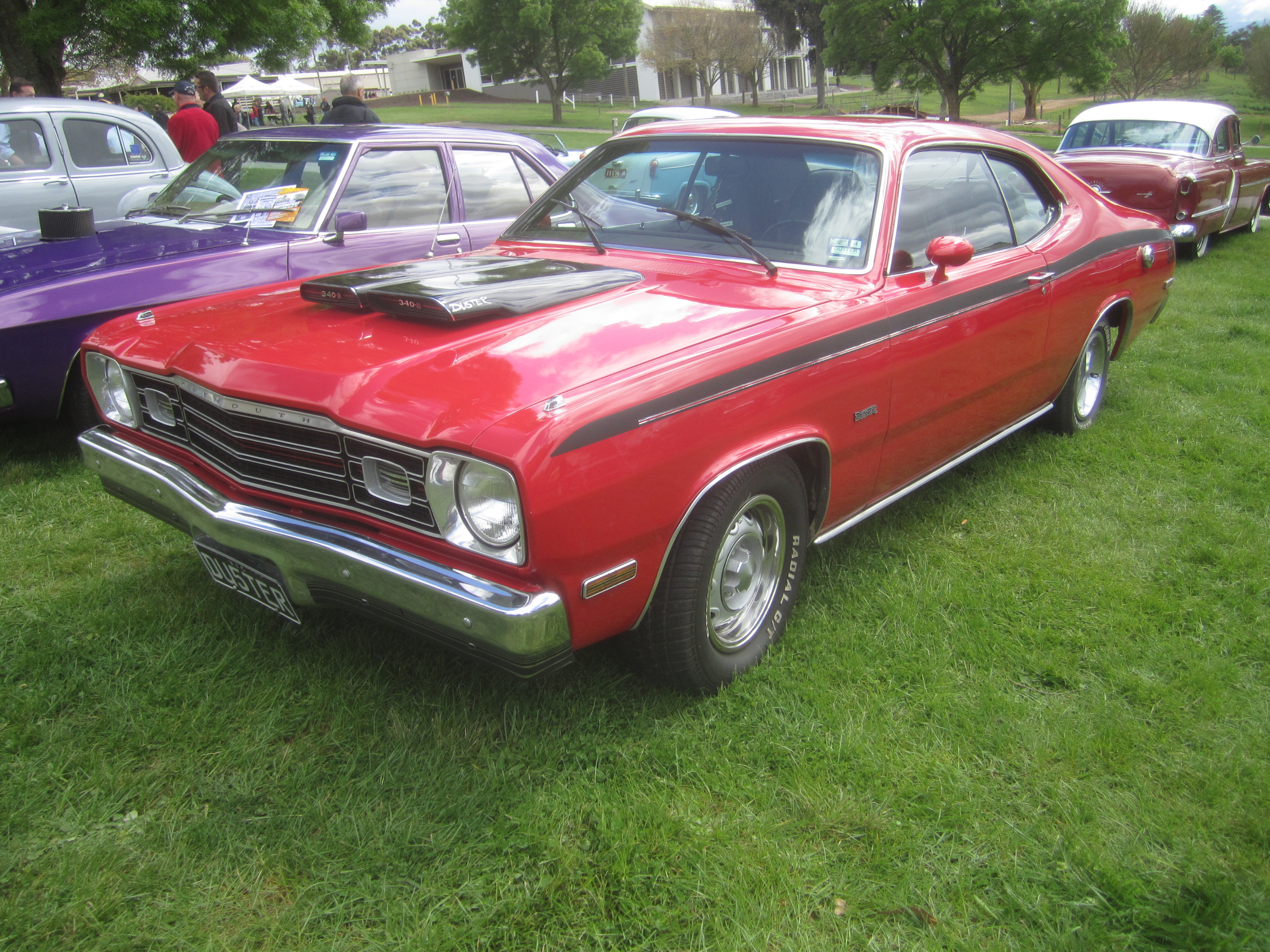
1973 Plymouth (Rapid Transit System) Duster 340

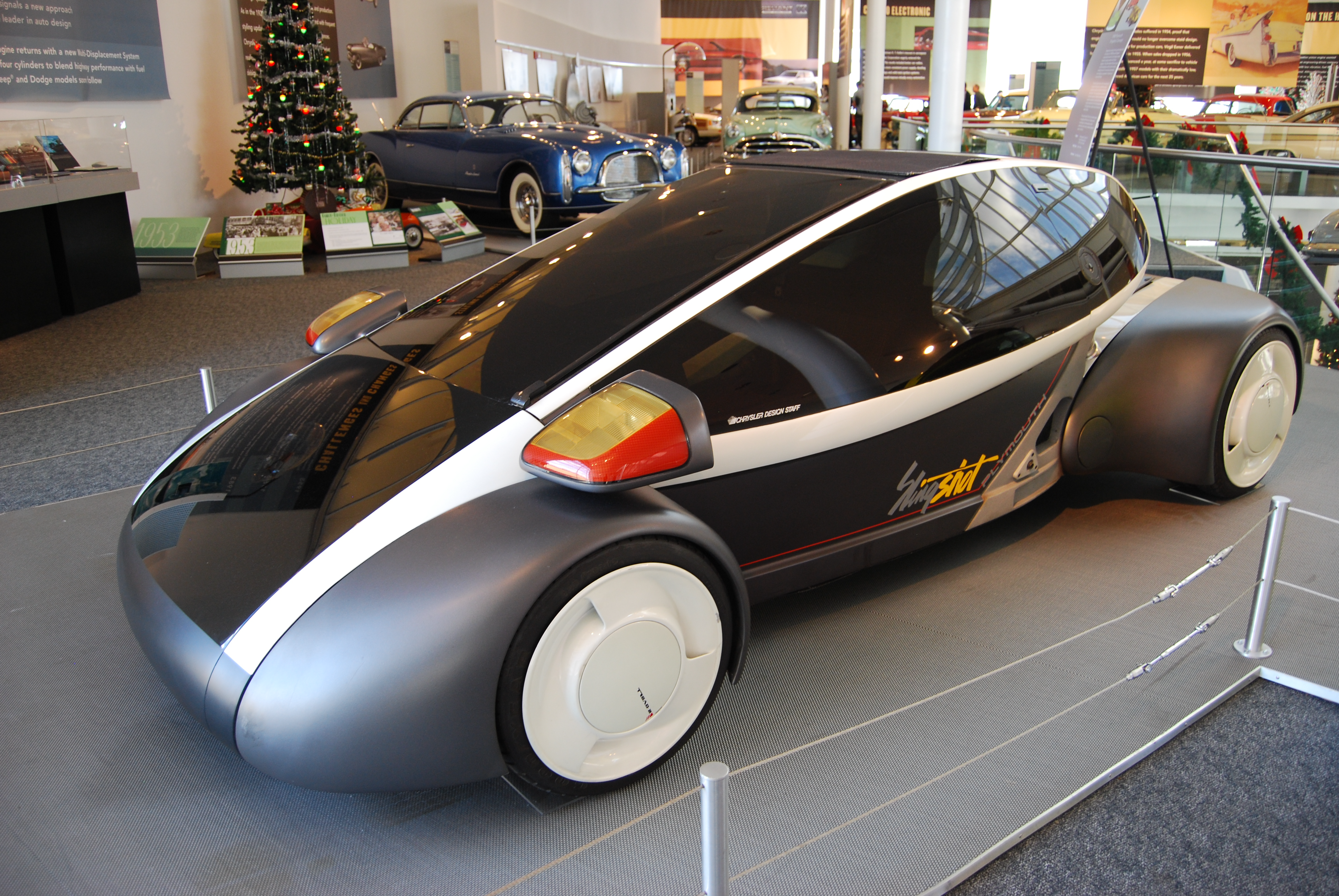
1988 Plymouth Slingshot

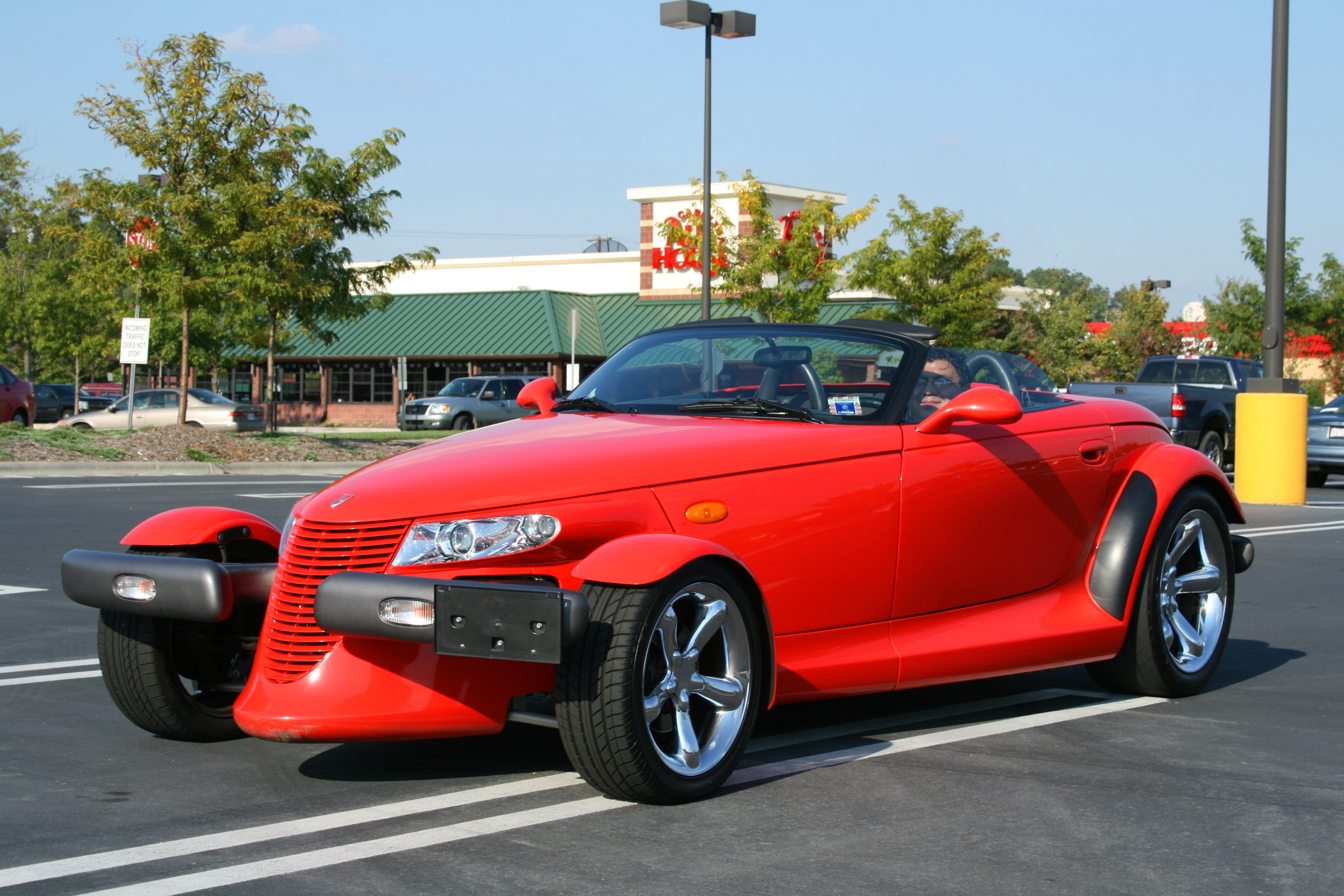
Plymouth Prowler

Model	Year	Type	Specifications	Features
XX-500	1951	Sedan		
Belmont	c. 1953	2-seater Convertible	3.9 L 150 hp (112 kW; 152 PS) V8	
Explorer	1954	Coupé	3.7 L 110 hp (82 kW; 112 PS) Straight-six engine	
Cabana	1958	Station wagon	Non-runner	Unique glass roof for the rear portion of the car.
XNR	1960	2-seater convertible	2.8 L 250 hp (186 kW; 253 PS) Straight-six engine	
Asimmetrica	1961	2-seater convertible	3.7 L 145 hp (108 kW; 147 PS) Straight-six engine	
Valiant St. Regis	1962	Coupé		
V.I.P.	1965	4-seater convertible		Unique roof bar from the top of the windshield to the rear deck.
Barracuda Formula SX	1966	Coupé		
Duster I Road Runner	1969	Coupé	340 hp (254 kW; 345 PS) V8; 426 hp (318 kW; 432 PS) V8	All features of the Road Runner plus flaps on top and sides and adjustable spoilers on the side of the rear fender, all to reduce lift.
Rapid Transit System 'Cuda (440)	1970	Convertible		
Rapid Transit System Road Runner	1970	Coupé		Three-colored tail lights: red for "braking", yellow for "coasting" and green for "on the gas".
Rapid Transit System Duster 340	1970	Coupé	5.6 L c. 300 hp (224 kW; 304 PS) V8	
Concept Voyager II	1986	Minivan		
Slingshot	1988	2-seater coupé	2.2 L 225 hp (168 kW; 228 PS) turbocharged Straight-four engine	Canopy that swings upwards to open the car Adjustable four-wheel independent suspension Keyless credit card-like entry Combined headlight and rear-view mirror pods Exposed engine and suspension
Speedster	1989	2-seater convertible		No opening doors
Voyager 3	1989	Minivan		The front of the car could be driven by itself or driven when attached to a "miniature tractor-trailer" Glass roof
X2S	1989	Coupé; Convertible	2.0 L (turbocharged) 167 hp (125 kW; 169 PS) V6	
Breeze	c. 1990	Sedan	2.0 L 132 hp (98 kW; 134 PS) 4 cylinder engine 2.4 L 150 hp (112 kW; 152 PS) Straight-four engine	
Prowler	1997	Convertible	3.5 L 214 hp (160 kW; 217 PS) V6	
Expresso	1994	Compact car		
Backpack	1995	2-seat truck	2.0 L 135 hp (101 kW; 137 PS) Straight-four engine	Space for a laptop on a small table Built-in bike rack on the back
Pronto	1997	Sedan	1.6 L 115 hp (86 kW; 117 PS) Straight-four engine	The front of the car resembled that of the Prowler; Roll-back fabric top
Pronto Spyder	1998	Convertible	2.4 L 225 hp (168 kW; 228 PS) Straight-four engine	
Howler	1999	Convertible	3.5 L c. 250 hp (186 kW; 253 PS) V6; 4.7 L c. 250 hp (186 kW; 253 PS) V8	
Voyager XG	1999	Minivan	2.5 L 115 hp (86 kW; 117 PS) turbocharged diesel engine	Powered retractable sunroof
