= Plymouth Explorer =

Concept car by Plymouth

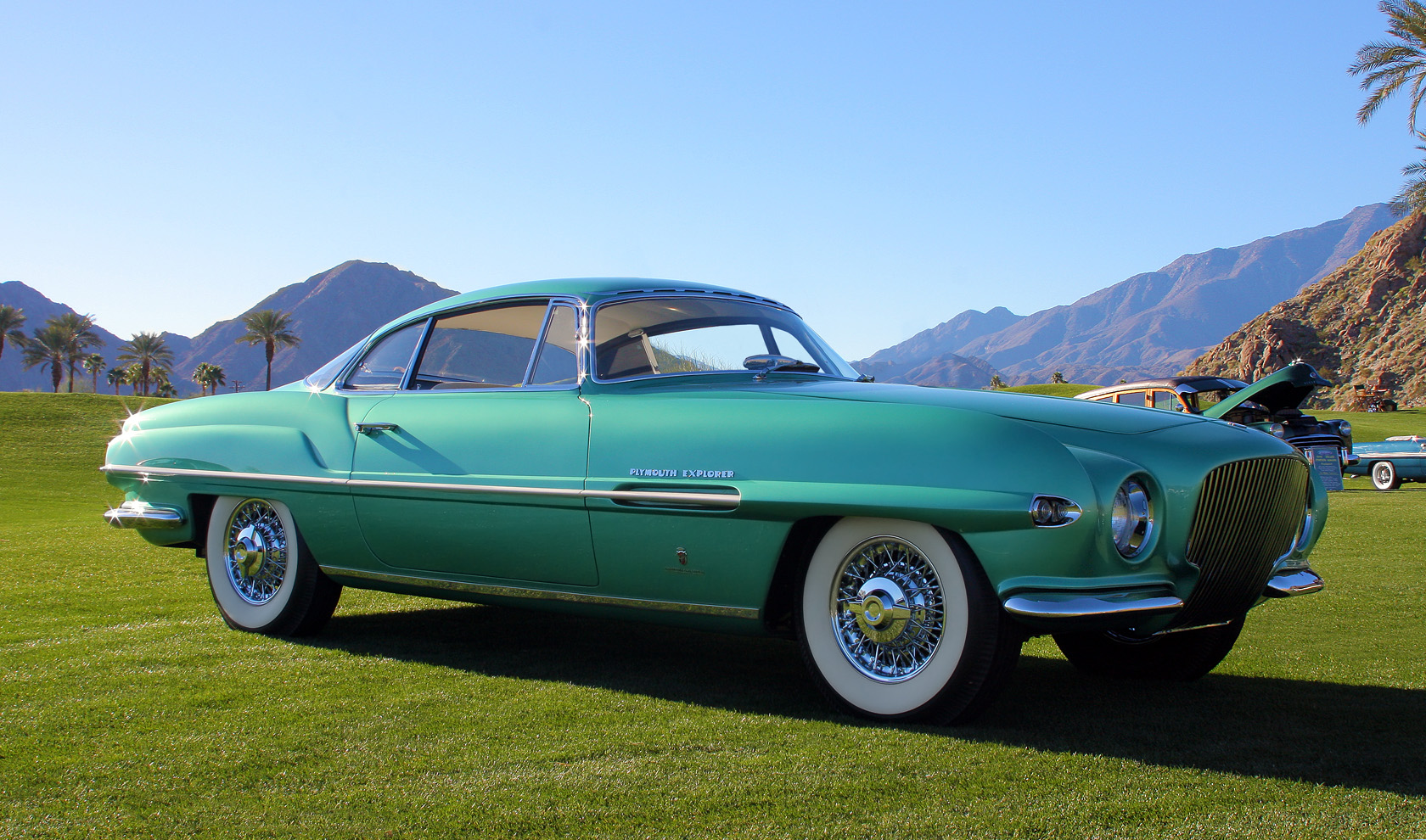
1954 Plymouth Explorer concept car by Ghia

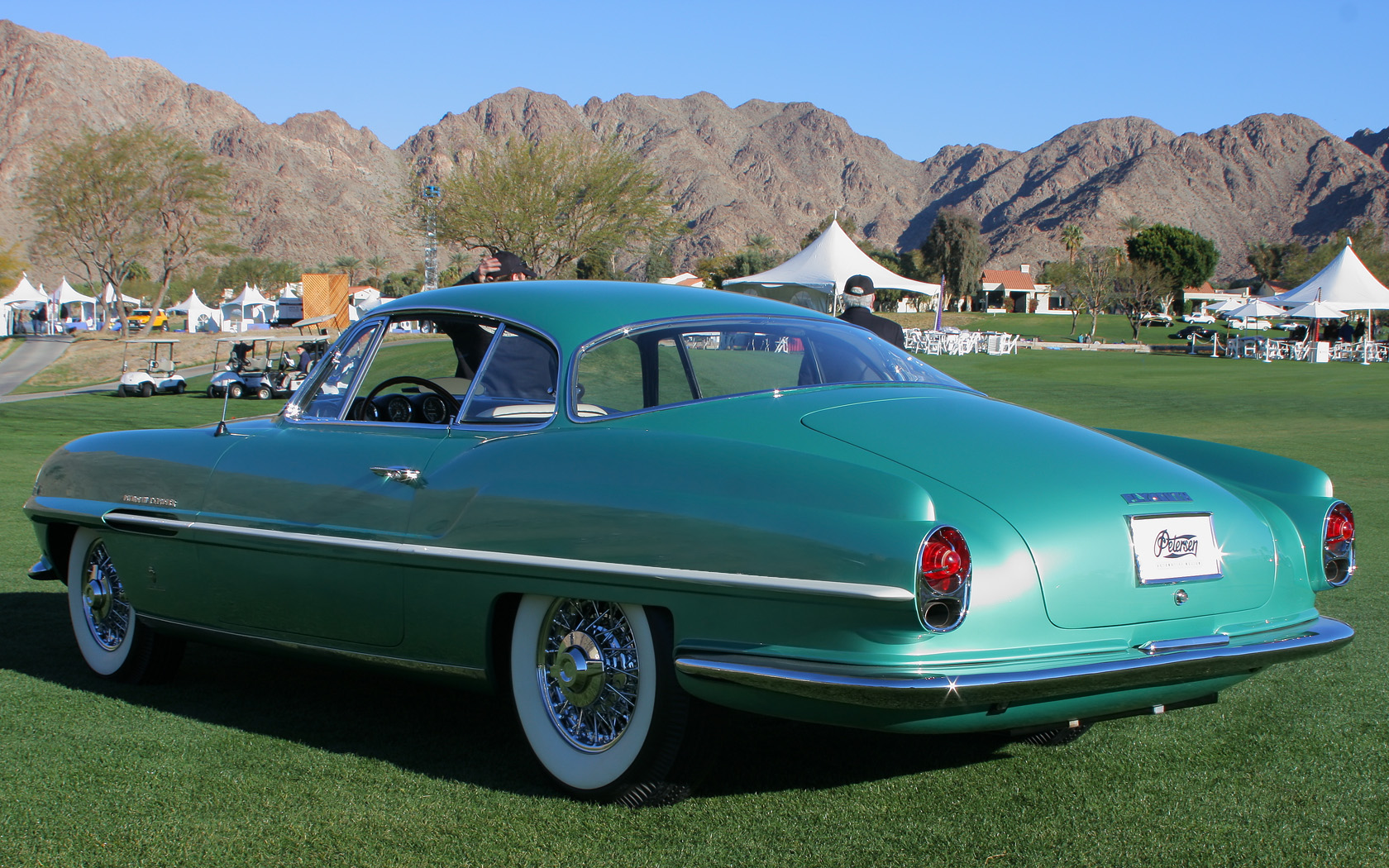
Rear view

The Plymouth Explorer is a 1954 concept car coupe by Plymouth. It was designed by Luigi Segre at Carrozzeria Ghia.
