= Pronto =

Pronto may refer to:

== Transport ==
- Ford Pronto, a vehicle rebadged Suzuki Carry
- Pronto (smart card), a contactless smart card used for public transit in San Diego, California
- Pronto Cycle Share, a defunct bicycle-sharing system in Seattle, Washington
- Pronto (bus service), operating between Manchester and Chesterfield in the UK
- Various concept cars produced by Chrysler:
  - Plymouth Pronto, a concept hatchback
  - Plymouth Pronto Spyder, a concept roadster
  - Chrysler Pronto Cruizer, a concept hatchback
- Pronto Airways, a Canadian airline

== Places ==
- Pronto Mine, in Ontario, Canada

== Other uses ==
- Pronto (magazine), a Spanish celebrity weekly
- Pronto (novel), by Elmore Leonard
- "Pronto" (Snoop Dogg song)
- Pronto, a chain of cafes in Japan managed by Suntory
- Pronto, alternate name in some countries for S. C. Johnson's Pledge cleaning product
- Pronto, a brand of touchscreen remote control
- Pronto Computers, a defunct American computer company
- Pronto condoms, released in South Africa
- Pronto Software, an Australian company
- Pronto.com, an Internet-based price comparison service
