= Plymouth Pronto =

Overview
- Manufacturer: Plymouth
- Production: 1997

Body and chassis
- Class: Concept car
- Body style: 5-door hatchback

Powertrain
- Engine: 2.0 L I4
- Transmission: 3-speed automatic

The Plymouth Pronto was a small passenger concept car manufactured by Plymouth. It was unveiled at the 1997 Detroit Auto Show.

== Design and features ==
The design was modern for its time along with several retro-style touches. The front "floating" bumperettes of the Pronto resembled that of the Plymouth Prowler. The Pronto also featured a roll-back fabric top. The Pronto never went into production, but its design inspired two more concept cars, the Plymouth Pronto Spyder and the Plymouth Pronto Cruizer (neither ever saw production).

The Pronto's design also inspired that of the Chrysler PT Cruiser, which went into production in 2001. Had the Plymouth marque not been discontinued, the PT Cruiser would have been sold as a Plymouth.

== Powertrain ==
The Pronto uses a 2.0 L I4 engine from the Dodge/Plymouth Neon mated with a 3-speed automatic transmission.
