= Chrysler Pronto Cruizer =

Overview
- Manufacturer: Chrysler
- Production: 1999
- Designer: Bryan Nesbitt

Body and chassis
- Class: Concept car
- Body style: 3-door hatchback

Powertrain
- Engine: 1.6 L EJD I4 from Dodge Neon
- Transmission: 5-speed manual

The Chrysler Pronto Cruizer is a 1999 concept car manufactured by Chrysler and made its debut at the 1999 Geneva Motor Show. Designed by Bryan Nesbitt, the car's design was ultimately evolved into the Chrysler PT Cruiser.

== Overview ==
The Pronto Cruizer debuted at the 1999 Geneva Auto Show as a possible Plymouth model—as with other "Pronto" concepts, the 1997 Plymouth Pronto and 1998 Plymouth Pronto Spyder. The Pronto Cruizer became a Chrysler due to the planned discontinuation of the Plymouth marque.

The vehicle carries a 1.6 L I4 engine with a five-speed manual transmission borrowed from the second generation Dodge/Plymouth Neon. The design was also derived from the Neon, but with elements borrowed from another DaimlerChrysler concept car, the Plymouth Pronto. The Pronto Cruizer has a grille and fenders that similar the one used on the Plymouth Prowler. A roll-back fabric top was used on the Pronto Cruizer as well.

== Diecast scale models ==
The Pronto Cruizer was recreated as a scale model by Maisto, reproduced first as a 1:18 scale model with an Aztec Yellow paint job. Later, a 1:64 scale model of the Pronto Cruizer was released in Aztec Yellow along with two Marvel superhero-themed liveries of The Incredible Hulk and Spider-Man.

Hot Wheels released a 1/64 scale version of the car and just simply named as "Chrysler Pronto".

== See also ==
- Chrysler PT Cruiser
- Dodge/Plymouth Neon
- Plymouth Prowler
