= Chrysler PT Cruiser =

Compact car line produced by Chrysler

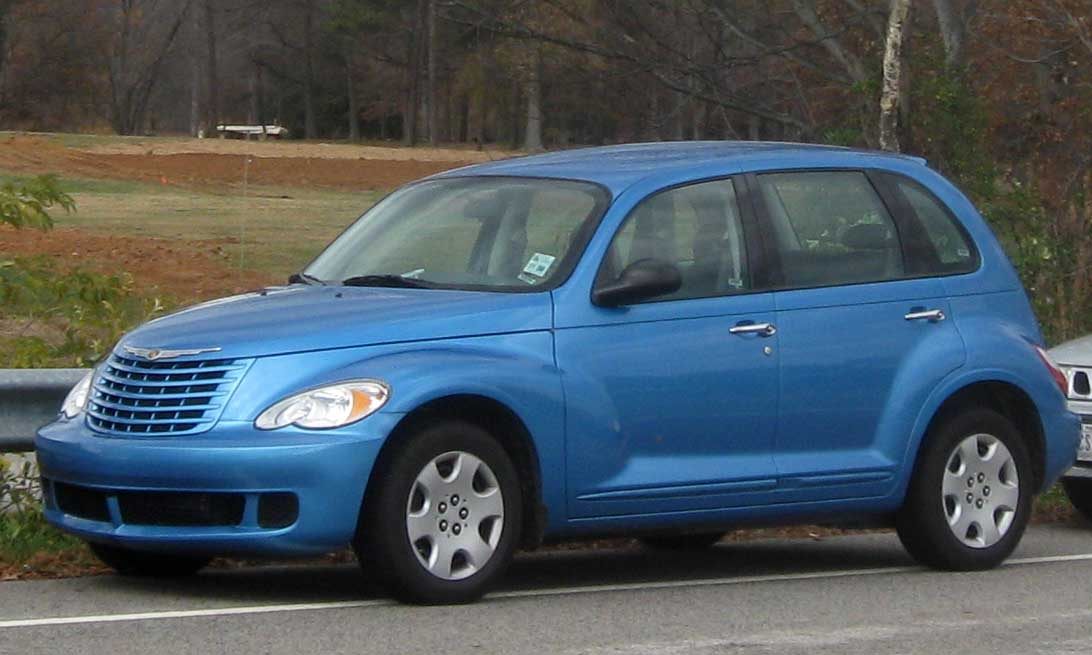

Overview
- Manufacturer: Chrysler (Note: DaimlerChrysler (2000–2007) Chrysler LLC (2007–2009) Chrysler Group LLC (2009–2010))
- Model code: PT; PG
- Production: 2000–2010
- Model years: 2001–2010
- Assembly: Mexico: Toluca, Mexico State (Toluca Car Assembly); Austria: Graz (Eurostar Automobilwerk)
- Designer: Bryan Nesbitt

Body and chassis
- Class: Compact car
- Body style: 2-door convertible 4-door hatchback wagon
- Layout: Front-engine, front-wheel-drive
- Platform: Chrysler PT platform
- Related: Dodge SRT4; Dodge Neon

Powertrain
- Engine: Gasoline: 1.6 L EJD SOHC 16v I4; 2.0 L ECC DOHC 16v I4; 2.4 L EDZ DOHC 16v I4; 2.4 L EDV/EDT DOHC 16v turbo I4; Diesel: 2.1 L Mercedes-Benz OM646 DE22 LA R CRD turbo diesel DOHC 16v I4
- Transmission: 4-speed Ultradrive 40TE automatic 4-speed Ultradrive 41TE automatic 5-speed Getrag 288 manual

Dimensions
- Wheelbase: 103 in (2,616 mm)
- Length: 168.8 in (4,290 mm)
- Width: 67.1 in (1,704 mm)
- Height: 63 in (1,600 mm); Convertible: 60.6 in (1,539 mm)
- Curb weight: 3,123 lb (1,417 kg)

Chronology
- Predecessor: Dodge Neon (Japan)
- Successor: Dodge Caliber (Japan)

The Chrysler PT Cruiser is a compact car that was built by the American company Chrysler from 2001 until 2010. Introduced as a five-door hatchback wagon, a two-door convertible variant was also made from 2005 until 2008.

Originally planned as a Plymouth model, the PT Cruiser was ultimately marketed as a Chrysler when Plymouth was discontinued. Intended to invoke 1930s aesthetics, the exterior of the PT Cruiser was designed by Bryan Nesbitt. The model received an intermediate facelift for the 2006 model year. Interior packaging was noted for its high roof, high h-point seating, and flexible cargo and passenger configurations enabled by a multi-level rear cargo shelf and rear seats a user could fold, tumble, or remove.

The PT Cruiser was produced in Mexico and Austria at the Toluca Car Assembly and Eurostar Automobilwerk factories respectively. By the end of production in July 2010, worldwide production had reached 1.35 million.

In its nameplate, PT stands for "Personal Transport" or "Personal Transportation." PT was the PT Cruiser's product code for the Mexican-made units.

== Overview ==
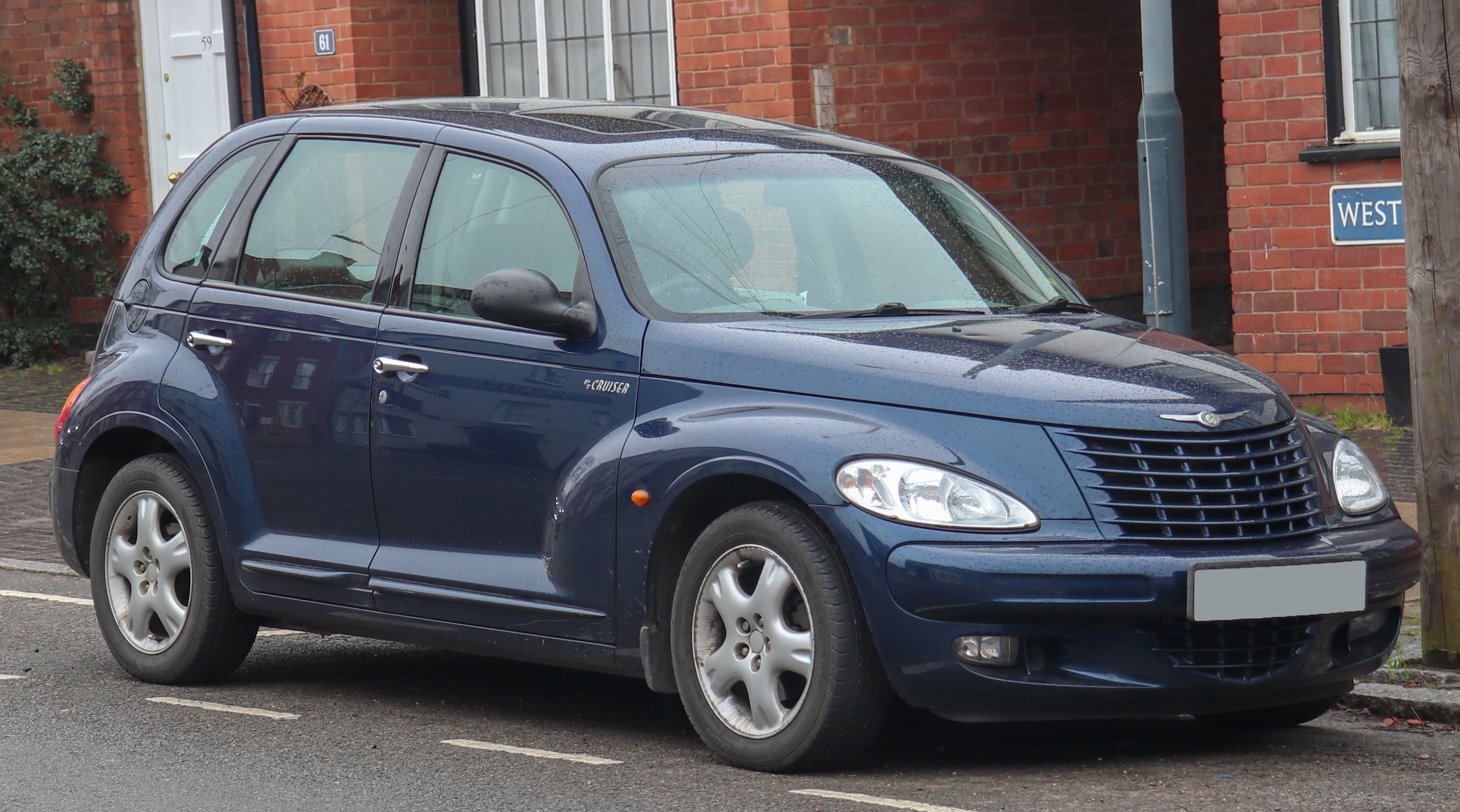
Chrysler PT Cruiser (pre-facelift)

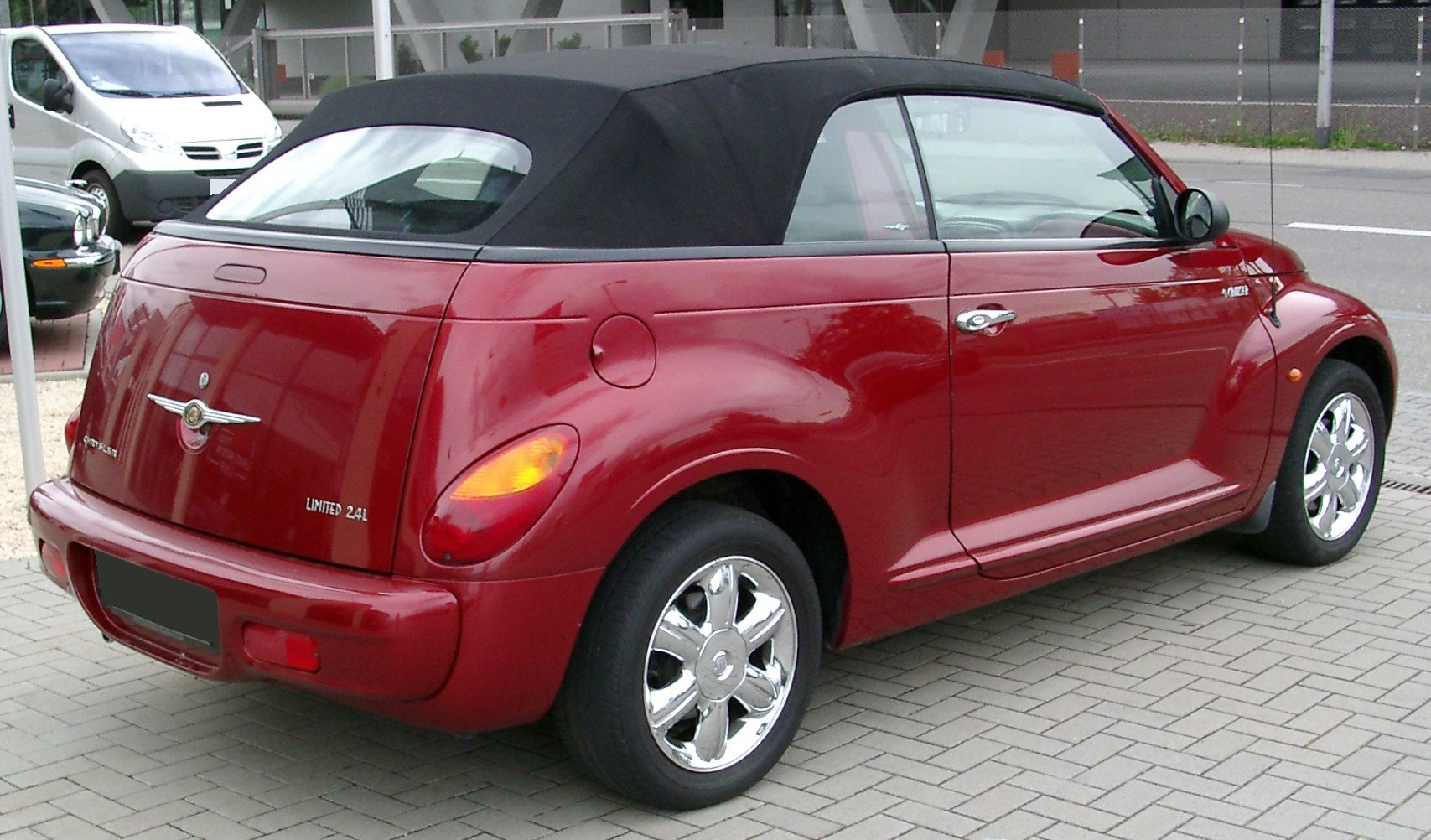
Chrysler PT Cruiser convertible (pre-facelift)

The PT Cruiser is a front-wheel drive 5-passenger vehicle, classified as a truck in the US by the NHTSA for CAFE fuel economy calculations but as a car by most other metrics. Chrysler specifically designed the PT Cruiser to fit the NHTSA criteria for a light truck to bring the average fuel efficiency of the company's truck fleet into compliance with CAFE standards. A turbocharged GT model was introduced for the 2003 model year. A convertible was introduced for the 2005 model year.

The cars were manufactured at Toluca Car Assembly in Toluca, Mexico. On March 8, 2006, DaimlerChrysler announced that 1,000,000 PT Cruisers had been built. The final PT Cruiser was built on July 9, 2010. A total of 1,050,281 PT Cruisers were marketed in the United States.

The PT Cruiser was also assembled at the Eurostar Automobilwerk in Graz, Austria, for markets outside North America, using the production code PG, for the model year 2002. European PT Cruisers built in 2001 or from 2003 on were manufactured in Mexico under the PT production code. The US version used a 2.4 L four-cylinder gasoline engine. In addition to this standard model, a 2.2 L four-cylinder diesel engine built by Mercedes-Benz was also available in Europe, Asia, and South Africa. A 2.0 L engine (D4RE) was also available outside the US. It produced 140 hp (104 kW) SAE at 6500 rpm with 130 lb⋅ft (176 N⋅m) of torque at 4800 rpm.

In July 2000, the PT Cruiser replaced the Neon in Japan as their small car offering. Chrysler sold over 10,000 PT Cruisers in Japan. The five-door hatchback, two-door convertible, and GT turbo engine package were sold in Japan in right-hand drive configurations. Japanese versions were manufactured at the Austrian factory and were equipped similarly to European specifications. From 2002 until 2007, the PT Cruiser was used in the city of Urayasu, Chiba Prefecture by the Maihama Resort Cab company to serve as a taxi in the vicinity of Tokyo Disneyland because of its fun, retro appearance. The PT Cruiser taxis augmented the Maihama Resort Line service to Tokyo Disneyland. The ten Chrysler PT Cruisers were to help customers "hold on to that lingering Disney feeling all the way home." The cars were offered in Japan until April 2010, when it was replaced by the Dodge Caliber.

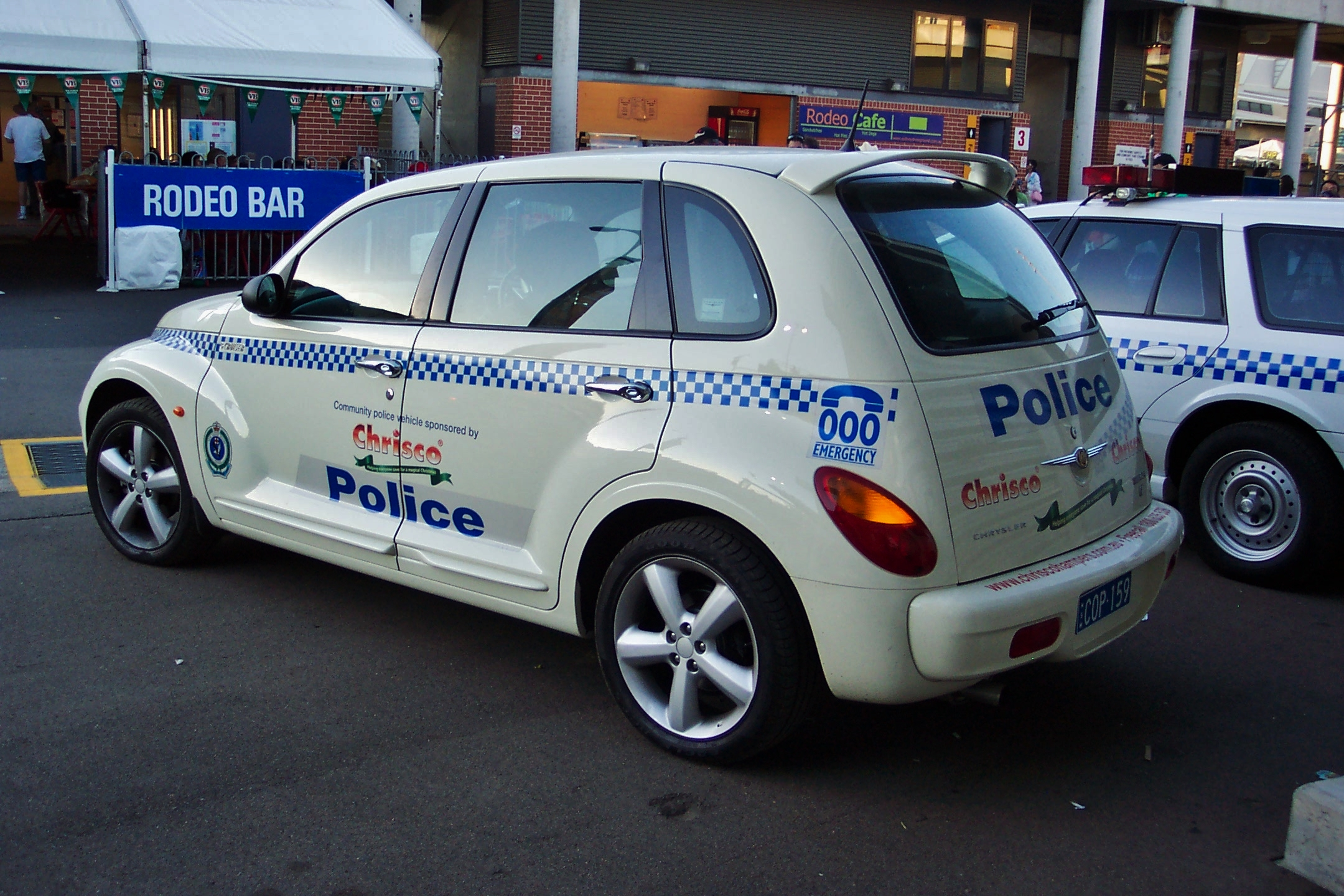
2005 PT Cruiser used by New South Wales Police in Australia as a community public relations vehicle

The PT Cruiser arrived in Australia in mid-2000 and came in only three specification levels: Grand Tourer, Limited, and Touring. Until 2006, the only choice of engine was the 2.0 L. The cabrio was introduced to Australia in 2006. From 2006, all models, including the new cabrio, received the 2.4 L I4 engine coupled to a four-speed automatic or five-speed manual. Sales were never spectacular, and the car's reputation for lackluster performance turned buyers to the competition. Sales sharply declined following the facelift despite the newer models having a more powerful engine. Between 2000 and 2009, total sales for Australia were 7,000.

In 2001 Motor Trend named the PT Cruiser as its Car of the Year and Car and Driver put it on its Ten Best list. The PT Cruiser also won the North American Car of the Year.

== Design ==
The PT Cruiser was part of the nostalgia wave that included models such as the Volkswagen New Beetle and the Mini Cooper. Rather than recalling previous namesake models, the PT Cruiser recalled the 1930s and 1940s styling, influenced by the Chrysler Airflow.

The 2000 PT Cruiser grew out of a collaboration with Robert A. Lutz, who was an executive at Chrysler at the time, Clotaire Rapaille, and Bryan Nesbitt. Nesbitt later went on to design the Chevrolet HHR.

The PT Cruiser's design was loosely inspired by the Chrysler Pronto Cruizer concept car while intended as a modern interpretation of the Chrysler and Desoto Airflow. Aspects of the PT Cruiser's rear styling also resembled the Chrysler CCV, a retro-styled compact vehicle recalling the Citroen 2CV.

On launch, the PT Cruiser was described as a market segment-buster. Daimler AG's Dieter Zetsche characterized it as a continuing example of the automaker's innovation for new segments, demonstrating "you can have head-turning style, practicality, and value all in one package."

Car and Driver described the design as "highly distinctive, appeals to a broad segment of the public, and is characteristically American." The public's reaction to the PT Cruiser was polarized, but inspired a solid following among owners. Overall, the car "was a valuable vehicle for many consumers."

== Updates ==
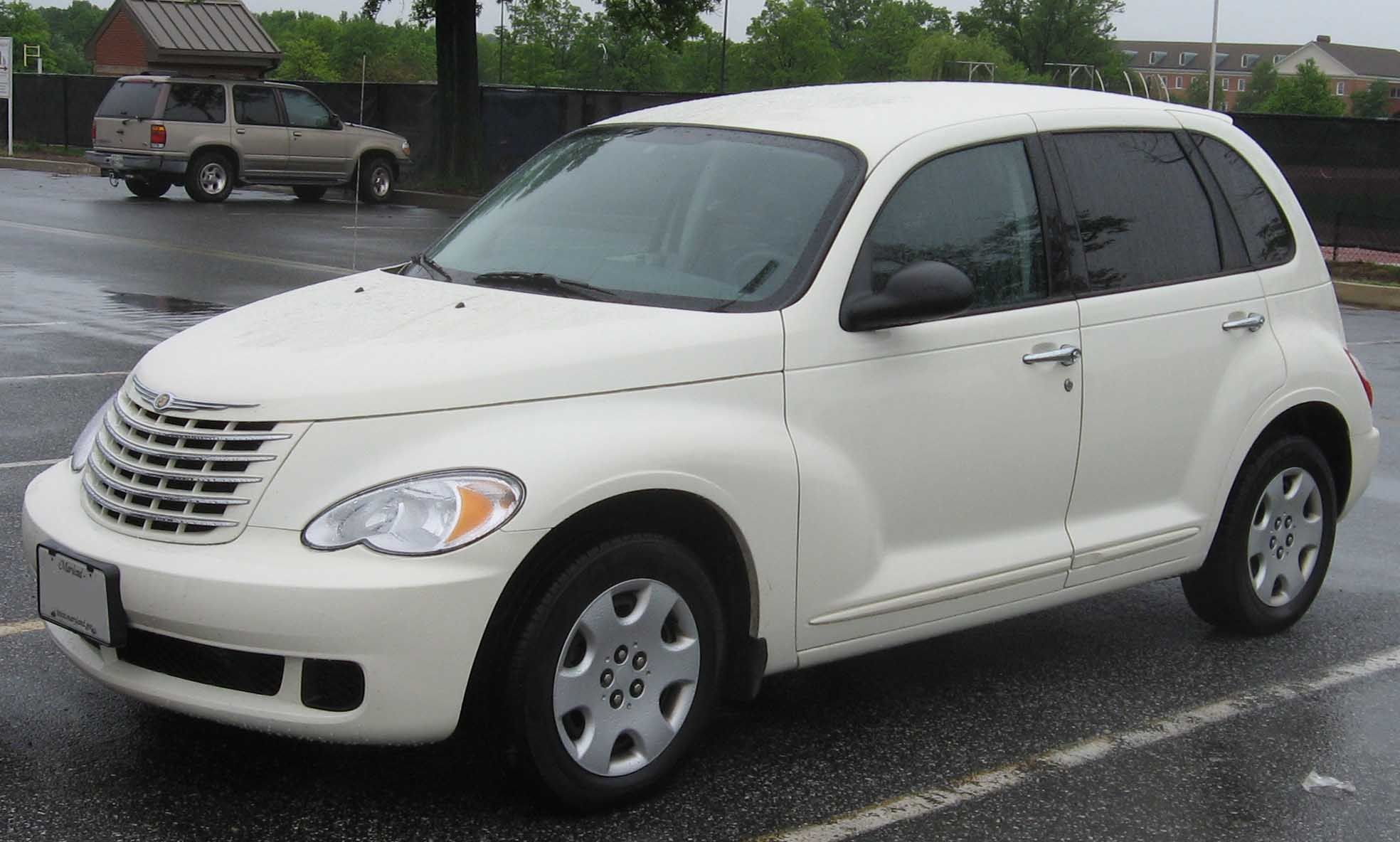
Facelift model Chrysler PT Cruiser, front view

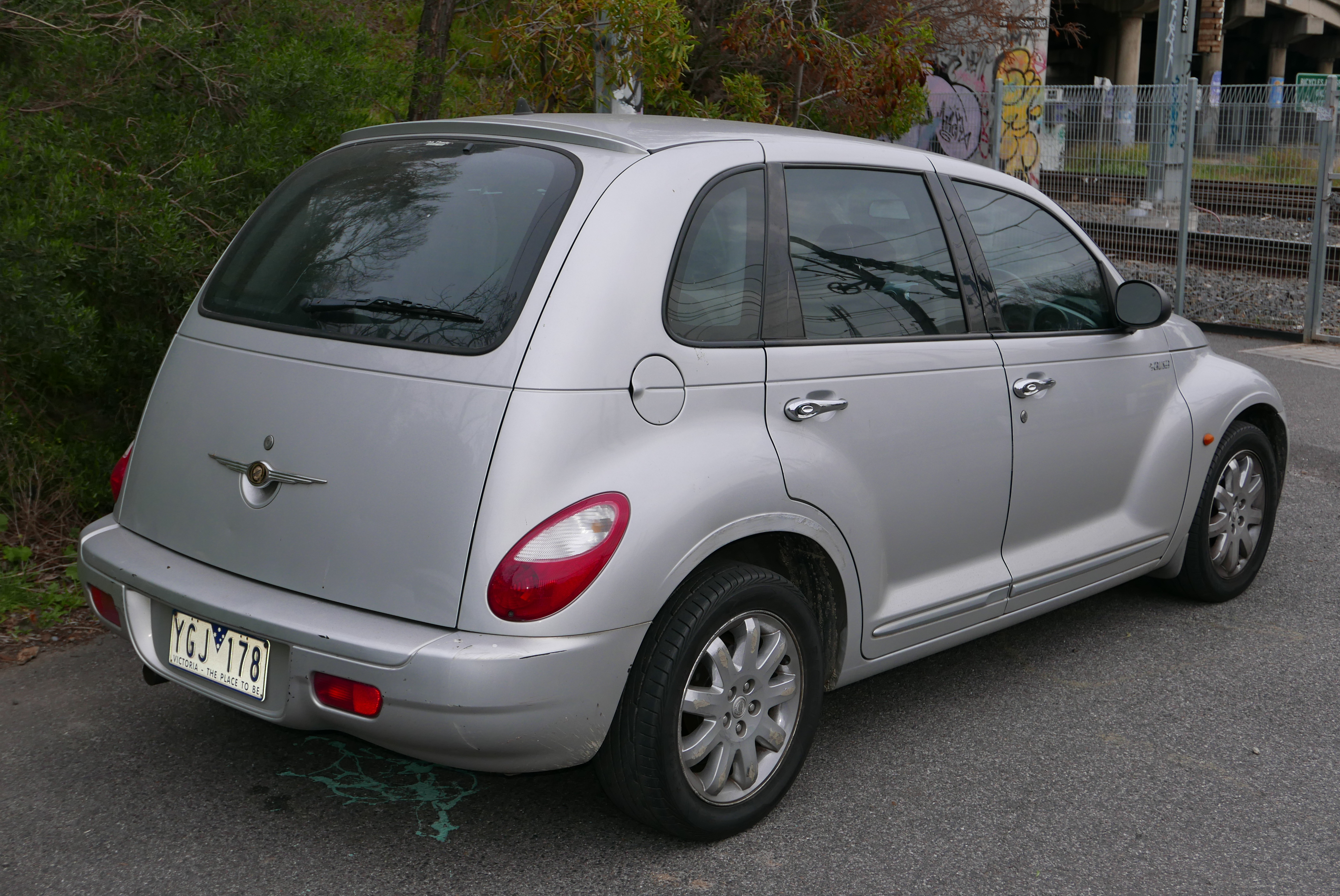
Facelift model Chrysler PT Cruiser, rear view

PT Cruiser models included the Classic edition, Limited edition, Touring edition, Couture edition (2010 only), "Dream Cruiser," "Street Cruiser," "Pacific Coast Highway" edition," and PT Cruiser GT. The non-GT Turbo (180 hp (134 kW)) edition models (introduced in 2004) were identified by a "2.4L Turbo" badge on the lower right-hand corner of the rear lift-gate. The GT model (introduced in 2003) has a "2.4L Turbo High Output" badge on the right-hand corner of the lift-gate indicating the 215–230 hp engine version.

Updates for 2006 included scalloped headlights, a revised grille no longer extending below the "bumper," a new lower front fascia that eliminated the patented brake cooling ducts, redesigned taillights, and available round fog lamps. The changes reduced the "retro vibe" that did not satisfy some customers and "exposed the main pitfall of retro design: How do you update old?"

Interior updates included a revised dash with an analog clock in the center stack. The audio system featured a line-in jack for MP3 players integrated into the dash. Features such as satellite radio, a premium sound system by Boston Acoustics with external amplifier and subwoofer, and UConnect hands-free Bluetooth for compatible cell phones also became available in 2006. The standard audio system now included an AM/FM stereo with single-disc CD player and a 3.5-millimeter auxiliary audio input jack with six speakers, replacing a cassette player and four speakers. The turbocharged 2.4 L I4 was available in 180 hp (134 kW) or "High-Output" 230 hp (172 kW) versions. A "Mopar" cruise control unit became available as an aftermarket unit on 2007 models. Also, in 2007, Chrysler dealers were permitted to order vehicles with separate options (unbundled options from option packages) such as anti-lock brakes and Side Impact Airbags. Sirius Satellite Radio also became an option that could be installed as a dealer option with a factory appearance (i.e., roof mount satellite antenna).

Original plans called for the PT Cruiser to receive a complete redesign for 2007, but that was pushed back. Little was changed as Chrysler was sorting out powertrains, styling, and even positioning as a luxury compact SUV. The convertible and the High Output engine were discontinued for the 2008 model year and sales dropped as information spread that Chrysler was going to discontinue the PT Cruiser shortly.

For 2010, the last year of production, a single trim level was offered, named the PT Cruiser Classic. It included a 2.4 L I4 engine producing 150 hp (112 kW); standard four-speed automatic transmission with overdrive; an AM/FM stereo with a single-disc CD player, auxiliary audio input jack, and six speakers; a rear-mounted spoiler; air conditioning; cruise control; a tire pressure monitoring system (TPMS); front and rear side SRS airbags; keyless entry with two remotes and a panic alarm; ABS anti-lock brakes; and sixteen-inch alloy wheels. Optional features included leather seating surfaces, a power front driver's bucket seat, an engine block heater, a power tilt-and-sliding sunroof, and heated dual front bucket seats. Exterior color options were Bright Silver Metallic, Brilliant Black Crystal Pearl Coat, Deep Water Blue Pearl Coat, Inferno Red Crystal Tinted Pearl Coat, Silver Steel Metallic, and Stone White Clear Coat. The only interior color option was Pastel Slate Gray.

== Safety ==
In 2002, Euro NCAP gave the PT Cruiser a three (out of five) stars rating. The car received bad results in the frontal impact test (6 out of 16 possible points). The height of the seats and side airbags helped to attain a maximum score of 16 points in the side impact test. The low frontal scores are partly explained by the cushioning near the knees, designed to protect unbelted occupants, which is not a factor in the EU where passengers must wear seat belts.

For 2008, the Insurance Institute for Highway Safety gave the PT Cruiser the highest rating of Good overall for occupant protection in frontal crashes and the lowest overall rating of Poor for side crashes. It was the only small car to not offer electronic stability control.

== Trim levels ==
Four-door hatchback

- Base: Included a 5-speed manual transmission; an AM/FM stereo with a cassette player (or single-disc CD player and auxiliary audio input jack for 2006–2009 models) and six premium speakers; manual roll-up windows (later standard power windows); manual door locks (later standard power door locks); fifteen-inch steel wheels with wheel covers; cloth seating surfaces; and a folding rear seat.
- Touring: Added AM/FM stereo with single-disc CD player, power windows and door locks, and keyless entry to Base.
- Touring Signature Series: Added Boston Acoustics premium speakers with an external amplifier, alloy wheels, and exterior color-keyed details to Touring. Special W.P. Chrysler Signature Series emblems on front fenders.
- Limited: Added AM/FM stereo with cassette and CD players (later six-disc CD/MP3 changer) and Infinity (later Boston Acoustics) premium speakers with an external amplifier, chromed alloy wheels, and leather-and-suede-trimmed seating surfaces with heated front seats to Touring.
- Street Cruiser: Added body kit, unique alloy wheels, and color-keyed exterior details.
- GT: Added high-performance 2.4 L Turbocharged Inline Four-Cylinder (I4) engine, special alloy wheels, and body kit to Limited. GT Cruiser emblem on tailgate.
- Walter P. Chrysler Signature Series (2005, 2006, 2007, and 2008)
- Limited edition Platinum Series (2004 only)
- Dream Cruiser Series (2002–2005, 2009 only): Added two-tone paint scheme and special alloy wheels.
- Sport: See below.
- Classic (2010 only): Same features as Touring trim level with alloy wheels.
- Couture (2010 only): Added single exterior color option and two-toned leather-trimmed interior to Classic.

Two-door convertible (same features as 5-door hatchback models with power-retractable cloth convertible top)

== Factory special editions ==
=== Flame package & Woodie package ===
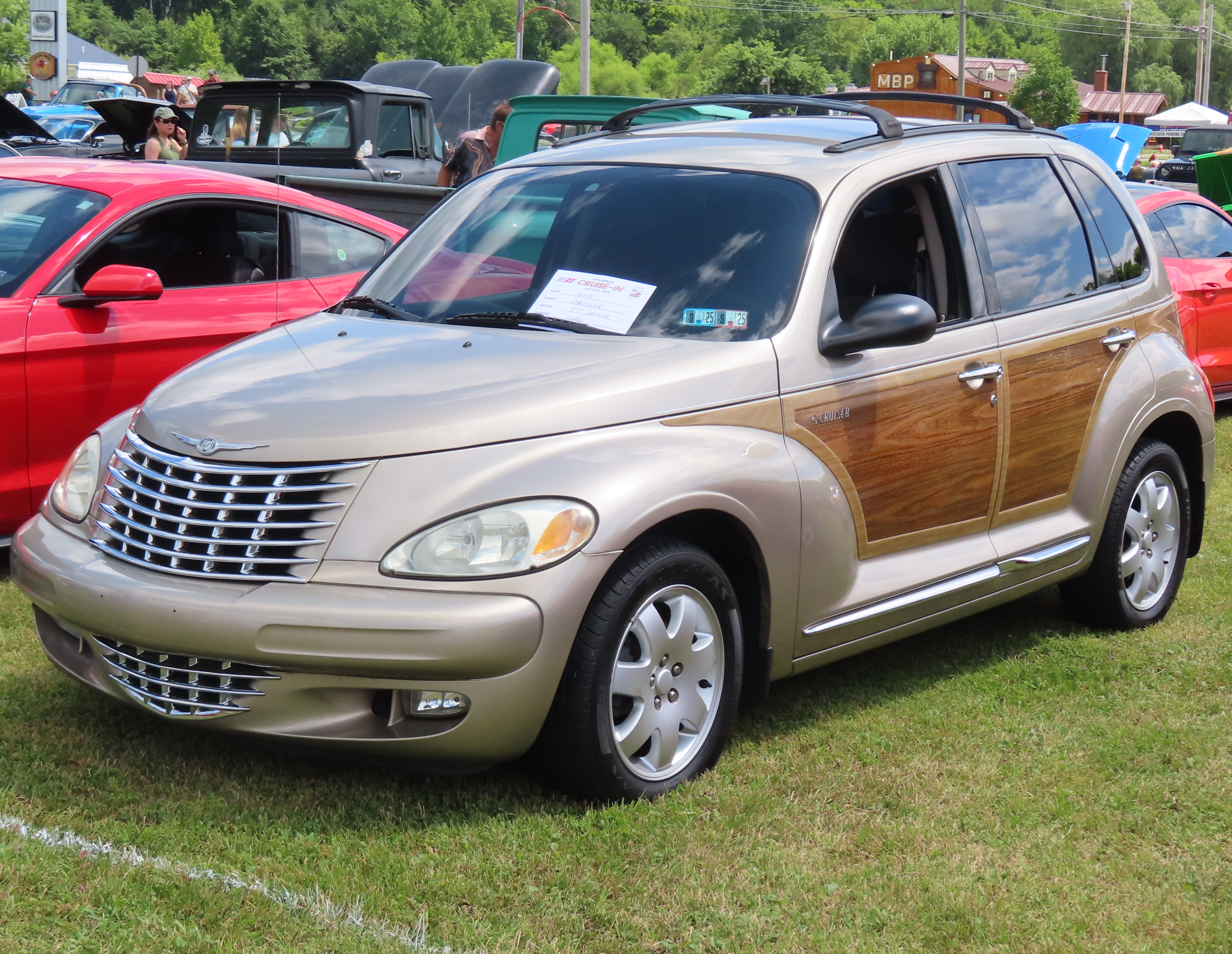
PT Cruiser with the Woodie package

Factory Flame package – Flame-inspired vinyl decals of a 'tone-on-tone' type applied on the hood, front fenders, and front doors, starting with 2002 models. Four flame designs: fading orange-to-red on cars painted red, fading blue to cranberry flames on cranberry finished cars, a dark silver that fades into bright silver on bright silver paint, and fading deep magenta to black flames highlighted with a blue border on black cars.

Woodie package – Available on all Chrysler PT Cruiser models from 2002 until 2004, the simulated wood panels were on the sides of the vehicle and the rear hatch. The vinyl graphic featured a linear Medium Oak woodgrain framed with Light Ash surround moldings. Chrysler described the designers were inspired by the automaker's wood-body heritage from the early Town & Country models.

=== PT Cruiser GT ===
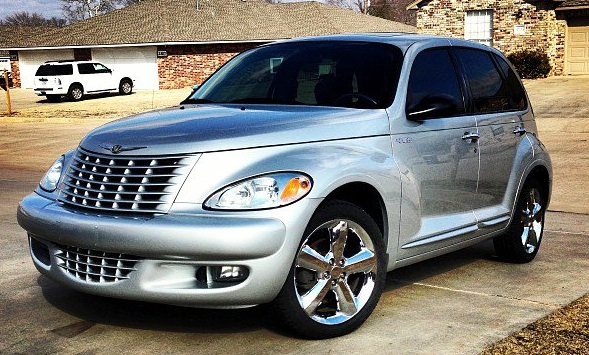
2003 Chrysler PT Cruiser GT

The PT Cruiser GT (also known as the GT Cruiser) is a high output turbocharged hot hatch variant of the PT Cruiser introduced as a 2003 model. The engine was upgraded over the standard PT. These modifications included piston oil squirters (to cool underside of pistons), eutectic aluminum alloy pistons made specially by Mahle, and forged connecting rods with cracked caps. Upgrades such as MOPAR Stage 1 and supporting turbo components were available from the manufacturer. Many of the performance parts from the SRT-4 are compatible with the PT Cruiser GT.

Performance

- 215 hp (160 kW) @ 5000 rpm and 245 lb⋅ft (332 N⋅m) @ 3600 rpm (2003–2005)
- 230 hp (172 kW) @ 5100 rpm and 245 lb⋅ft (332 N⋅m) @ 2400 rpm (2006–2007)
- Top speed 125 mph (201 km/h) (Governor limited)

Standard features

- Autostick or 5-speed Getrag manual transmission
- 4-wheel disc brakes with ABS and traction control
- Larger disc-brake rotors and Turbo calipers
- Chromed 17-inch wheels with P205/50R17 tires
- Body-color monotone front fascia with larger, lower openings
- Body-color monotone rear fascia with larger exhaust opening
- Specially tuned suspension (which also dropped the height 1 inch)
- Performance-tuned exhaust system with a large diameter chrome exhaust tip

=== Street Cruiser Route 66 edition ===
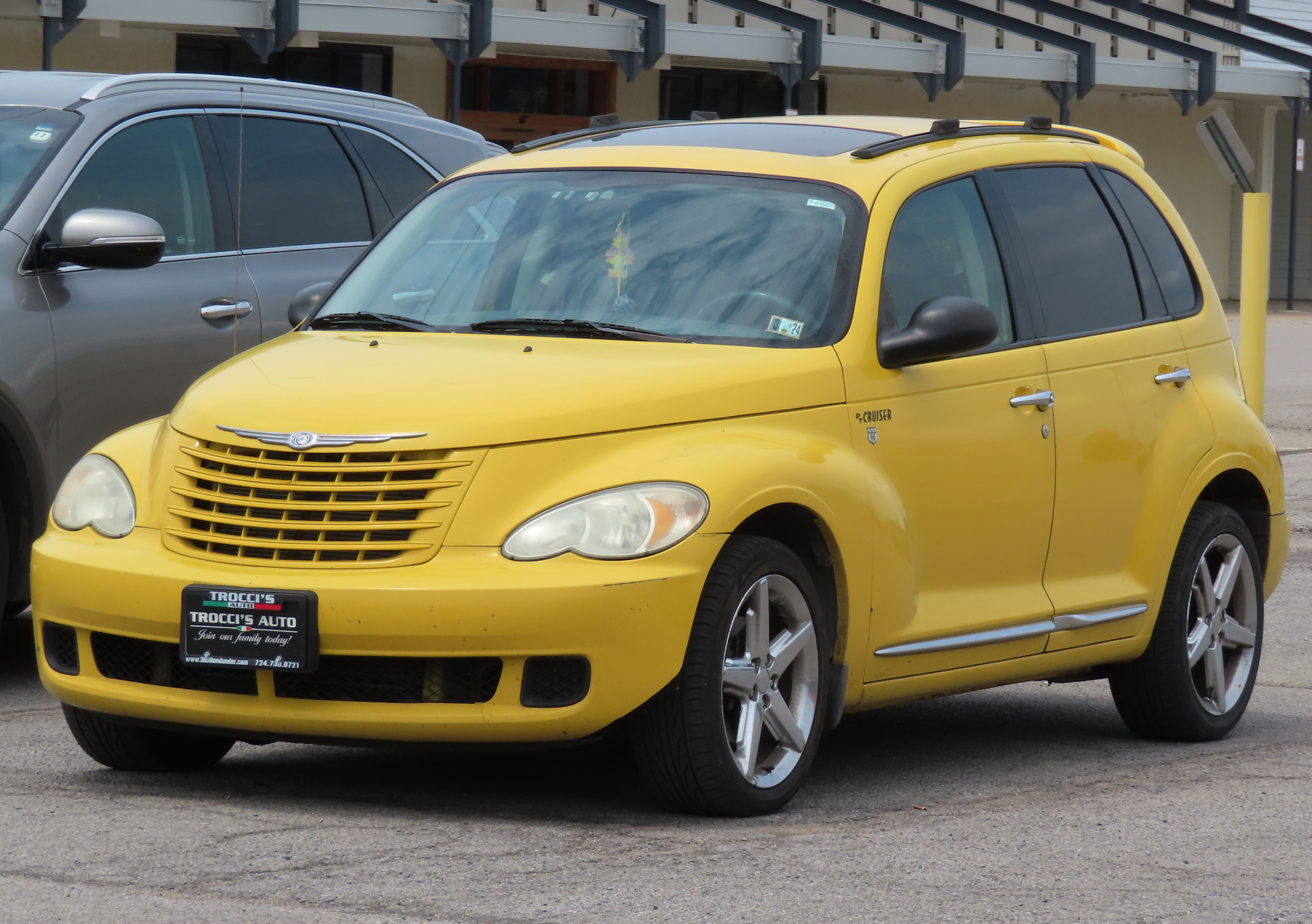
2006 Chrysler PT Street Cruiser Route 66 Edition in Solar Yellow

Available in 2006 was a Route 66 edition in either Solar Yellow or Black. This version featured Solar Yellow brake calipers, body-color grille, solar-tinted sunscreen glass, lift-gate mounted spoiler, 17-inch all-season performance tires, four-wheel anti-lock brakes with low-speed traction control, speed control, and a sport suspension. Brightwork accents included chrome body-side moldings, a chrome exhaust tip, and 17 inch chrome-plated five-spoke Empire aluminum wheels. Exterior identification included a 'Street Cruiser' badge with Solar Yellow accents on the lift-gate and 'Route 66' badges on the front doors.

=== Street Cruiser Pacific Coast Highway edition ===
Announced during the 2006 Woodward Dream Cruise and named for one of the most picturesque driving routes (officially called California State Route 1) in the United States. Based on the 2007 Chrysler PT Cruiser Touring model, this version featured a Pacific Blue Pearl body, 4-wheel disc anti-lock brakes, bright front door sill scuff pads, front bright accent ring cupholders, silver shift knob, chrome lock knobs, chrome body-side molding, "Street Cruiser" badge, Pacific Coast Highway edition badge, rear body-color spoiler, bright exhaust tip, leather steering wheel with bright spokes, sport suspension, supplemental side airbags, 6-way power driver's seat, Sirius satellite radio, 17x6 inch aluminum platinum finished wheels with 205/50R17XL 93H BSW all-season performance tires, and cloth seats with blue insert.

=== Street Cruiser Sunset Boulevard edition ===
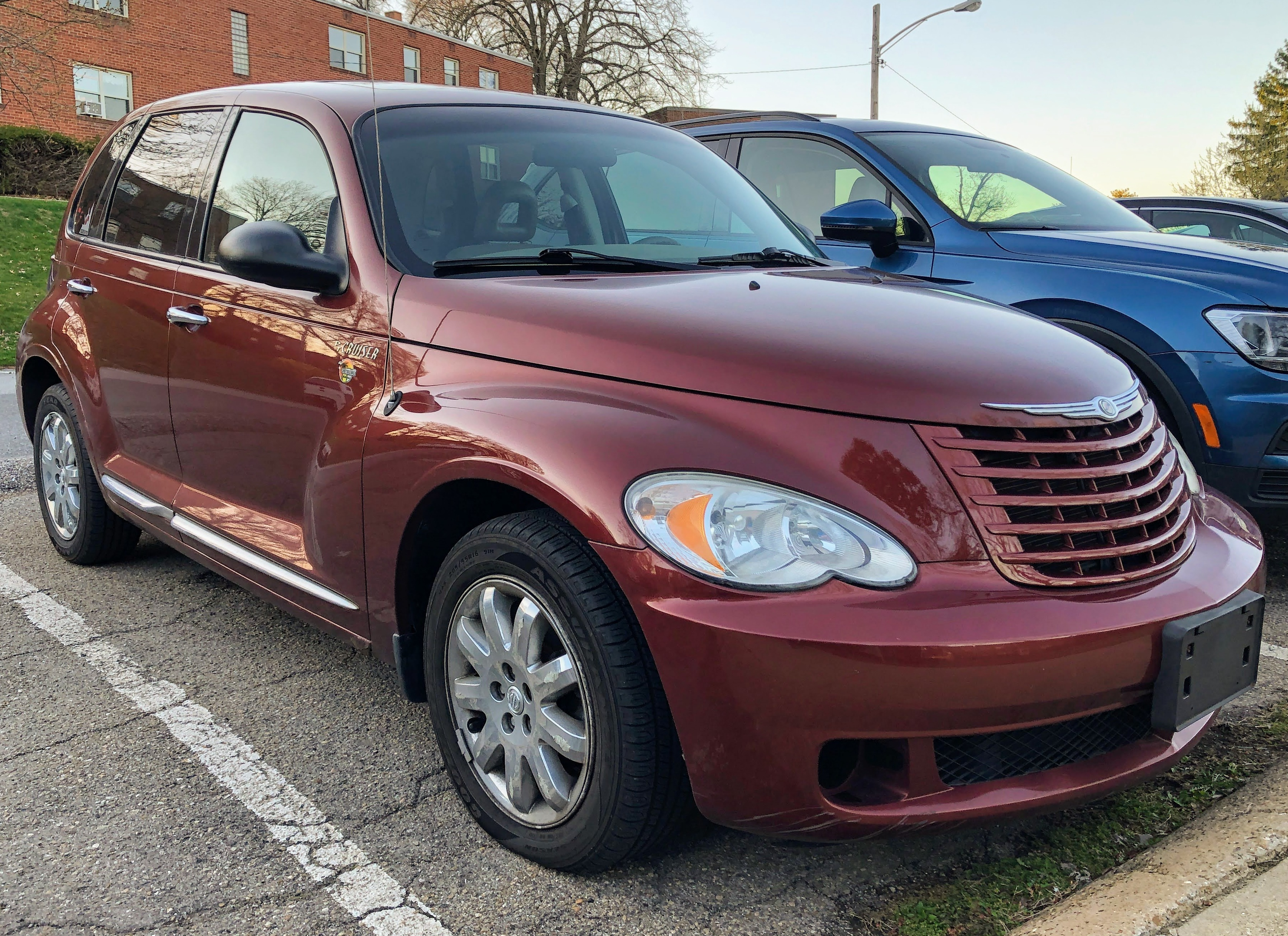
2008 Chrysler PT Street Cruiser Sunset Boulevard limited edition

A version of the 2008 PT Cruiser LX was named for a road (Sunset Boulevard in Los Angeles, California) that has been described as an influence for many movies, songs, and TV shows. Street Cruiser Sunset Boulevard edition version was based on the 2008 PT Cruiser LX and was limited to 500 units. It included "Sunset Crystal" paint accented with various chrome body-trim pieces, deep-tint glass, and 16-inch chrome wheels with all-season touring tires.

=== Dream Cruiser Series 5 ===
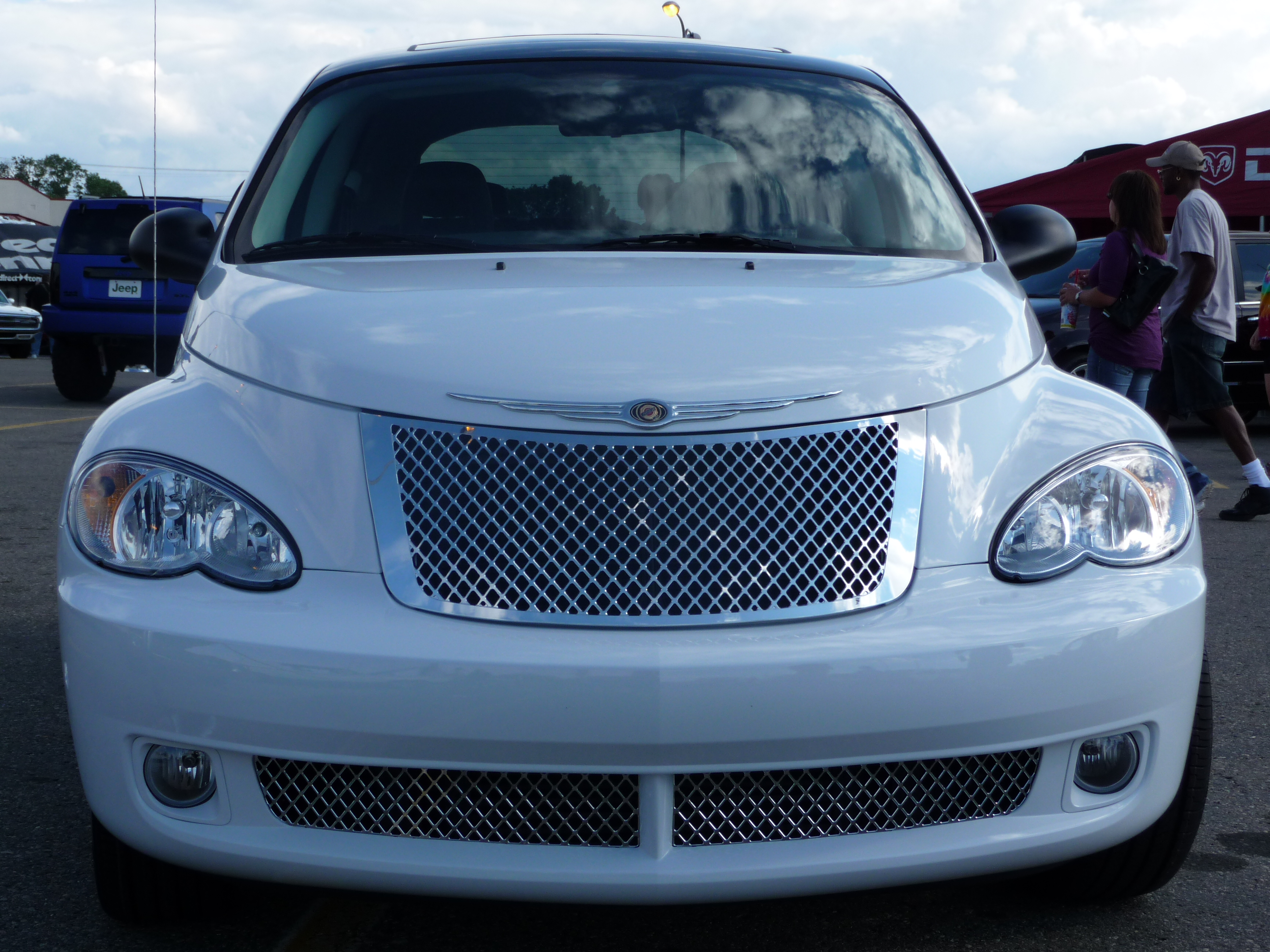
2009 Dream Cruiser 5

The Dream Cruiser Series 5 production totaled 1,750 units for the US market during the 2009 model year. It included 4-speed automatic transmission, pearl-white body (however one was made in inferno red and one finished in bright silver) with a black roof and spoiler, gray interior with leather and chrome trim, upper- and lower-billet aluminum cross-hatch pattern grilles, chromed door handles and body-side moldings, chromed stainless-steel exhaust tip (on turbo), 17 in (432 mm) SRT Design wheels with all-season performance tires, unique 'PT' door badging, PT Dream Cruiser Series 5 tailgate badge, fog lamps, and a Brilliant Black Crystal Pearl hoop spoiler.

The vehicle was announced in conjunction with the 2008 Woodward Dream Cruise.

=== PT Cruiser Sport ===
Based on the Classic trim, the Sport version included a roof-mounted body-colored spoiler, 16-inch alloy wheels, a PT Cruiser Sport badge, and an exclusive graphite metallic paint.

The PT Cruiser Sport was available with a 2.0 L gasoline engine in the UK market.

=== Couture edition ===
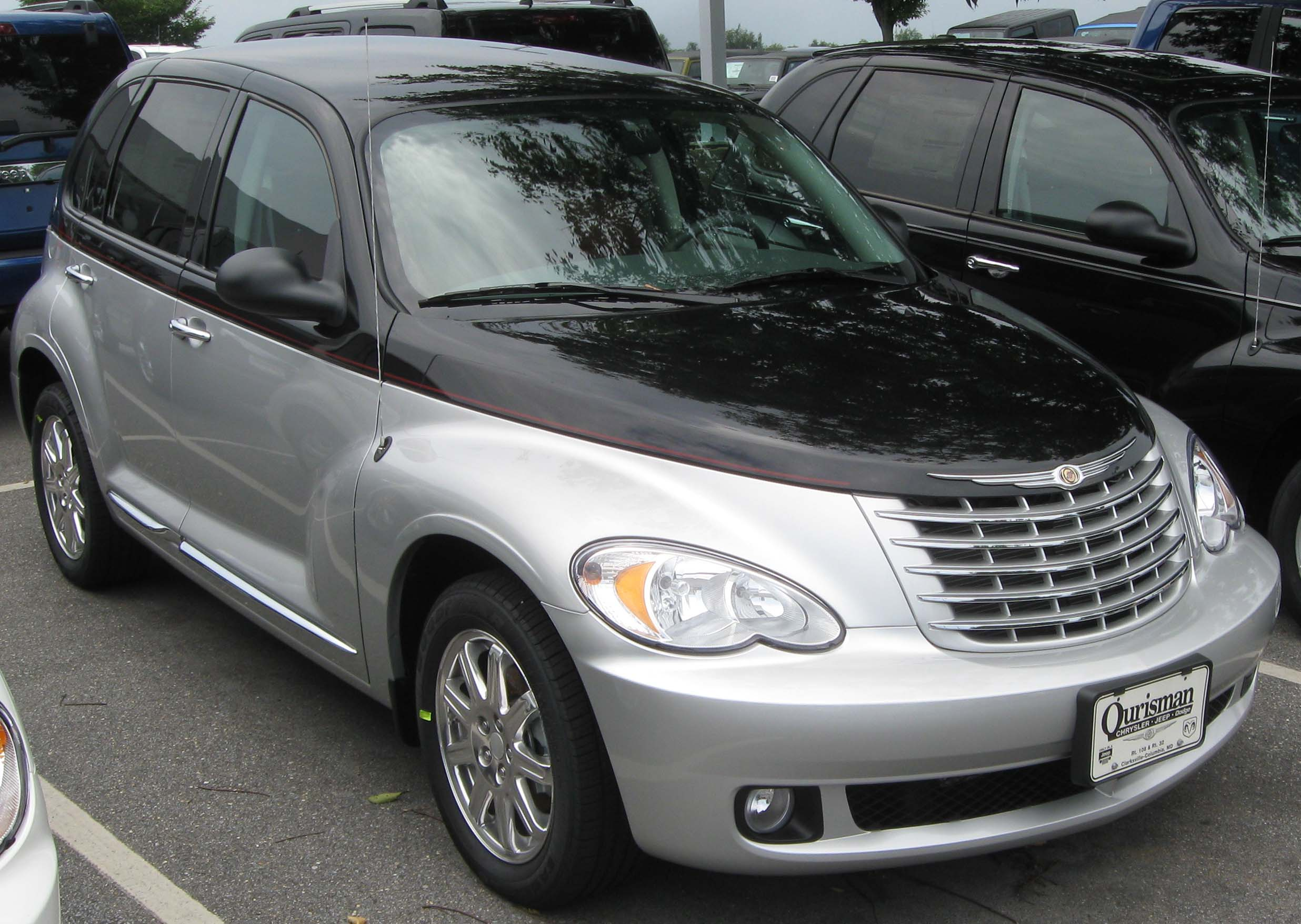
2010 Chrysler PT Cruiser Couture edition

The Couture edition was exhibited at the 2010 Geneva Motor Show as part of the expansion to the European market. It featured a contrasting two-tone paint scheme: black above the beltline and silver metallic on the bottom section, with a red pinstripe dividing the two. The interior included Radar Red leather buckets (dark gray leather optional) with black piping, a red or black shifter knob, and chrome appliques. Outside features included 16-inch chrome-clad wheels with chromed body-side moldings and accents. Production was limited to 500.

== Chrysler Panel Cruiser ==
The Chrysler Panel Cruiser was a design study that appeared at the 2000 Detroit Auto Show. Based on the PT Cruiser, it featured panels in place of the rear doors and a wooden floor rather than rear seats. The Panel Cruiser was designed to mix elements of classic American panel trucks with those of a sports sedan. It featured 17-inch chrome wheels and its rear cargo space had a wood floor with bright skid strips and wood bars, while the side quarter panels included cargo straps for a multi-use cargo area.
