= Bryan Nesbitt =

American automobile designer (b.1969)

Bryan Edward Nesbitt is an American automobile designer, widely known as Senior Vice President of Global Design for General Motors Corporation since July 1, 2025 — having succeeded Harley Earl, Bill Mitchell, Irv Rybicki, Chuck Jordan, Wayne Cherry and Ed Welburn and Michael Simcoe.

Previously Nesbitt had held the position of GM's North American Exterior Design and Global Architecture Strategy and had been a designer with Chrysler. Several of his more prominent styling contributions have been to the Chrysler PT Cruiser, the similarly retro Chevrolet HHR, the seventh generation Chevrolet Malibu, and the 1997 Chrysler CCV, which had been conceived as a Chinese people's car with bodywork constructed of recycled plastic bottles.

== Background ==
Nesbitt was born in Phoenix, Arizona, and had wanted to be an automobile designer since childhood. He studied Architecture and Industrial Design at the Georgia Institute of Technology and holds a bachelor's degree with Honors in Transportation Design from the Art Center College of Design in Pasadena, California.

Speaking of the childhood influences on his design perspective, Nesbitt cited several summer drives across North America in an AMC Gremlin with his mother:

This gave me a good sense of what makes the American culture," he says, "and why we end up with the solutions we do here versus the rest of the world. I value that.

== Career ==
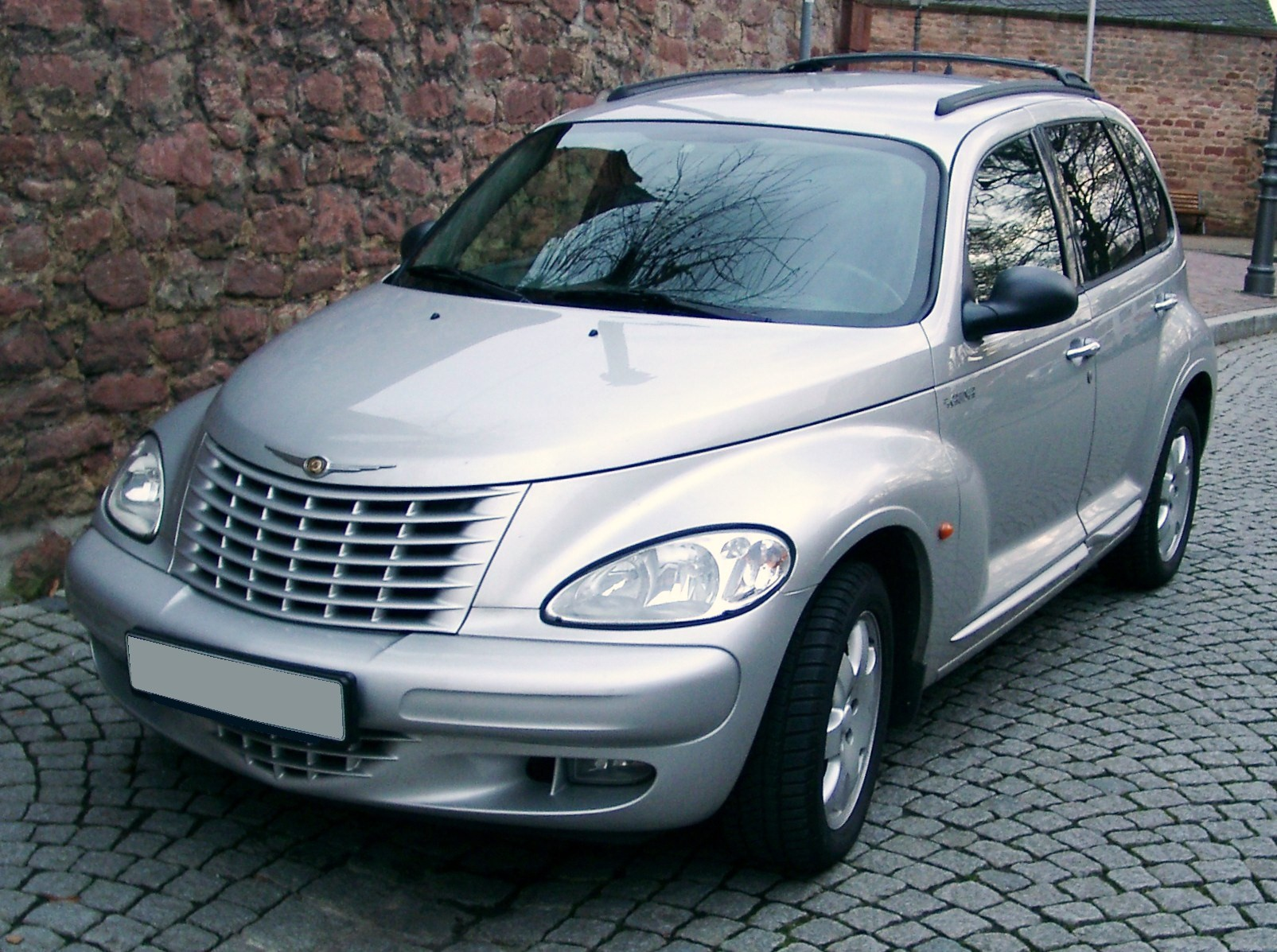
Chrysler PT Cruiser

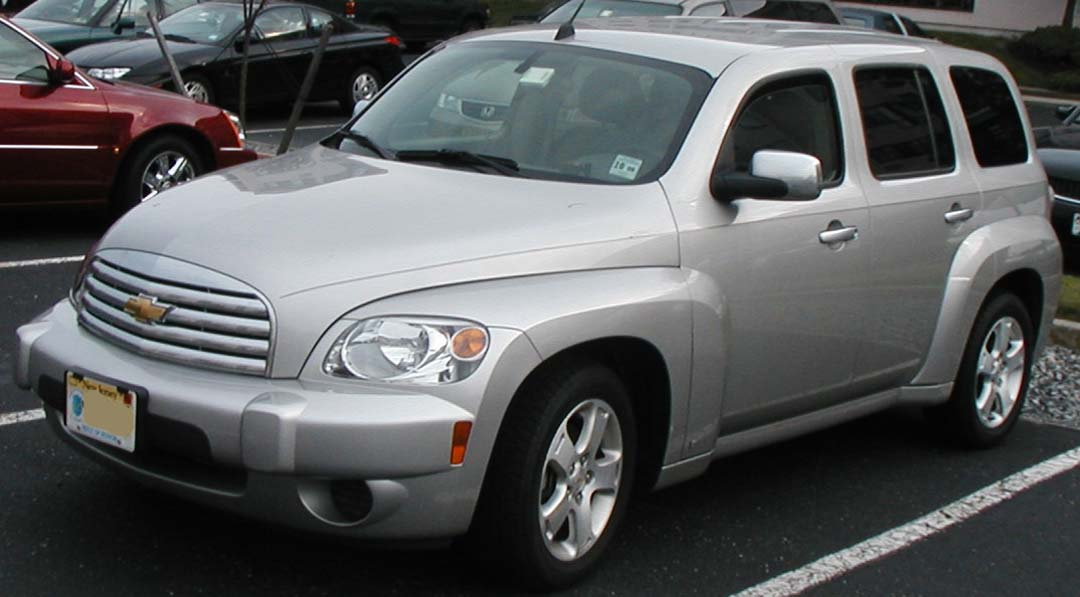
Chevrolet HHR

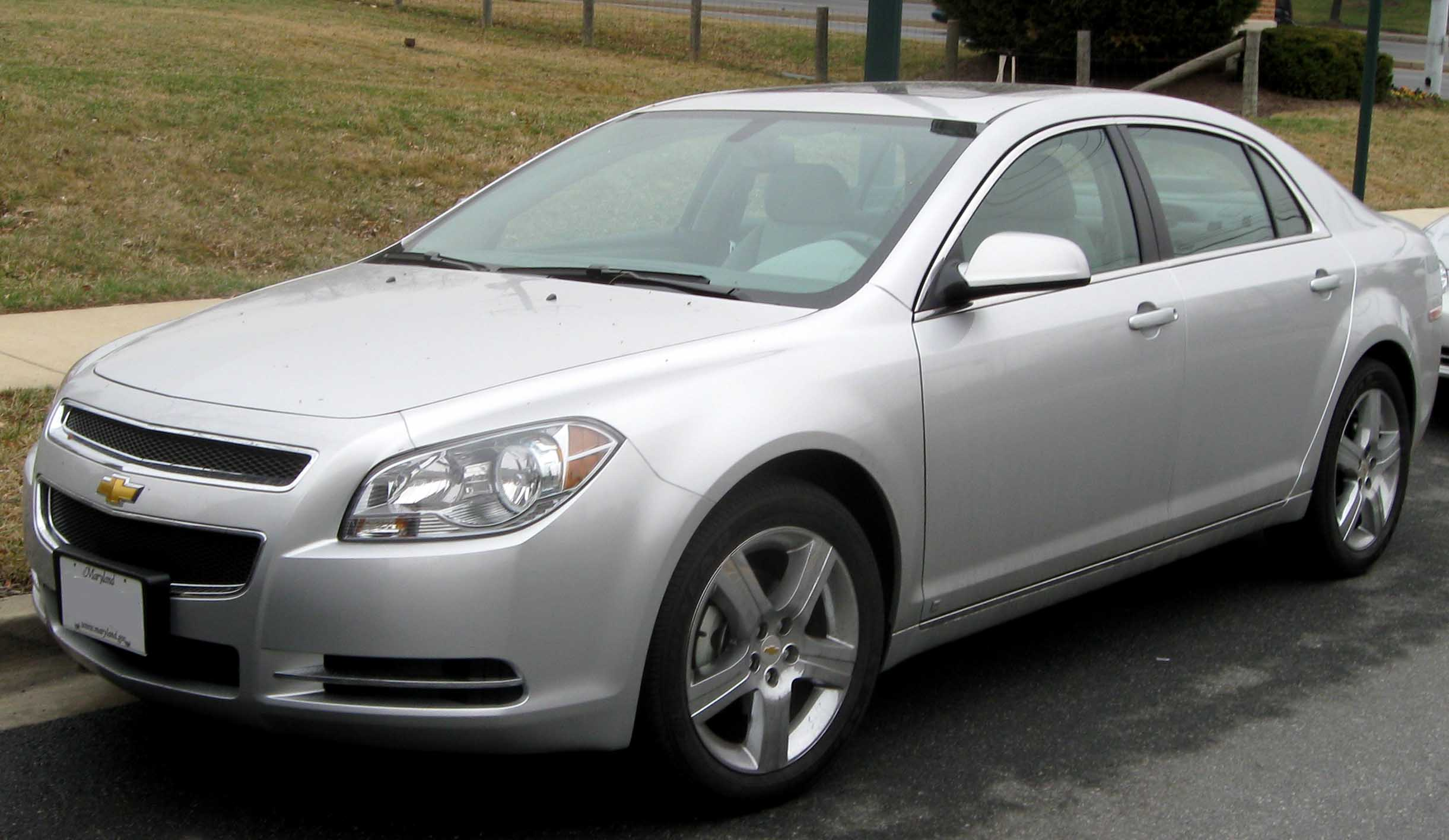
Chevrolet Malibu, Gen 7

At DaimlerChrysler for seven years, Nesbitt designed the 1999 PT Cruiser concept vehicles, the 1998 Chrysler Pronto Cruizer and the 1997 Chrysler CCV. Nesbitt joined General Motors in April 2001 as chief designer for the Chevrolet brand. In January 2002, Nesbitt was appointed executive director in design and body-frame integral architectures for all North American GM brands. He became Executive Director of GM Europe Design in February 2004, and was responsible for all Opel, Saab, and Vauxhall design activities. In June 2007, he returned to the U.S. as the General Motors Vice-President of Design for North America, responsible for all brands marketed and sold in the United States, Canada, and Mexico—at the time those were Chevrolet, Cadillac, Buick, Pontiac, Saab, Saturn, GMC, and Hummer. In July 2009, GM put Nesbitt in charge of the Cadillac brand, then removed him from that position on 2 March 2010 back to his old position as executive director of the advanced concept group.

As one of the youngest GM designers, Nesbitt contributed to the design of the Pontiac Solstice, Pontiac G6 coupe, Cadillac DTS and BLS, Buick Lucerne, Chevrolet Impala, HHR and Cobalt coupe, Saturn Aura and Sky, GMC Acadia, Saturn Outlook, and Buick Enclave.

In a 2001 USA Today article, Bob Lutz clarified Nesbitt's role in the Chevrolet HHR design:

during one of his (Lutz) first trips to GM's design center, he saw sketches of a vehicle that had been rejected, and ordered Brian Nesbitt, Chevy's design chief for concept cars, to get it ready for the show. Nesbitt, credited with designing PT Cruiser at Chrysler, arrived at GM a few months before Lutz. The concept was not a Nesbitt design, but he will be in charge of the final product. Lutz describes it as a heritage vehicle, a term he also uses to describe Cruiser, whose design he championed while at Chrysler. "It will be fully modern, but with a grille and lines that harken back.

In a July 2008 interview for the Atlanta Journal-Constitution, Nesbitt spoke of his design philosophy at GM:

The competition in the industry is fierce, and you have to make sure you're always putting your best foot forward in terms of the quality of your products. In the past, GM had a problem with some of its vehicles. The quality wasn't as high as people expected, and from a design standpoint they weren't that appealing. If you look back at those cars five, six years ago, they were terrible. But then you can make them into success stories. You figure out why they aren't connecting with people and you address that. It's all about the customer.

Nesbitt won an Automotive Hall Of Fame 2002 Young Leadership And Excellence Award while at GM.

In February 2004, Nesbitt was appointed as the Executive Director of GM Europe Design. In this role, he was responsible for overseeing the design and development of vehicles for Opel, Saab, and Vauxhall, three of GM's key European brands. Returning to the U.S. in June 2007, he served as GM's Vice-President of Design for North America, overseeing brands including Chevrolet, Cadillac, Buick, Pontiac, Saab, Saturn, GMC, and Hummer.

In July 2009, Bryan Nesbitt was appointed General Manager of the Cadillac brand, a move that marked a significant transition from his design-focused roles to a broader leadership position within General Motors (GM). In this capacity, Nesbitt was responsible for overseeing Cadillac's global operations, including marketing, sales, and product planning, aiming to revitalize the brand's image and market presence. In March 2010, GM announced a restructuring of its North American operations, leading to Nesbitt's reassignment. He transitioned to the role of Executive Director of the Advanced Concept Group, focusing on innovative design strategies and future vehicle concepts.

In August 2011, Nesbitt was appointed Vice President of Design for GM International Operations (GMIO), based in Shanghai, China. In this role, he served as the lead voice for design in the GMIO region and acted as the brand chairman for Wuling and Baojun, GM's joint venture partners in China.

In March 2022, Bryan Nesbitt was appointed Executive Director of Global Cadillac Design. In this role, he oversaw the brand’s design strategy and development, drawing on his extensive experience at General Motors (GM).

In July 2025, Bryan Nesbitt was appointed General Motors' Head of Global Design, succeeding Michael Simcoe. Making automotive history as only the eighth person to lead GM's worldwide design organization in nearly a century, Nesbitt oversees the company's global design strategy following his tenure shaping advanced concepts and future portfolio direction, including notable concept vehicles like the Cadillac Opulent Velocity and SOLLEI.
