= Pronto (bus service) =

Bus service in Nottinghamshire and Derbyshire, England

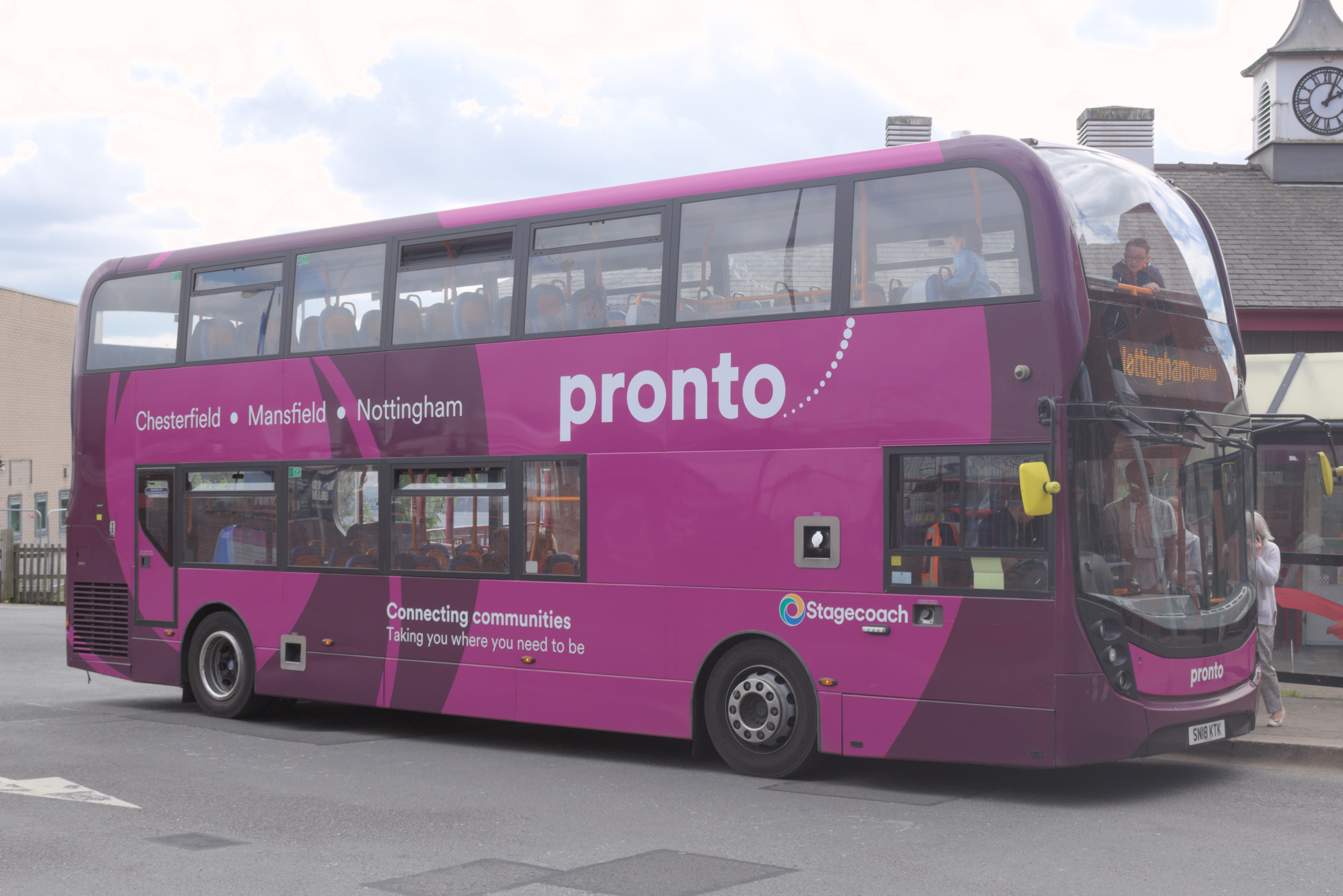
- Pronto-branded Alexander Dennis Enviro400 MMC operated by Stagecoach East Midlands in Chesterfield in May 2025

Overview
- Operator: Stagecoach East Midlands
- Status: Operational
- Former operator: Trentbarton

Route
- Start: Chesterfield
- Via: Mansfield
- End: Nottingham
- Timetable: Pronto timetable

Pronto is a bus route that runs between Chesterfield and Nottingham via Mansfield.

== History ==
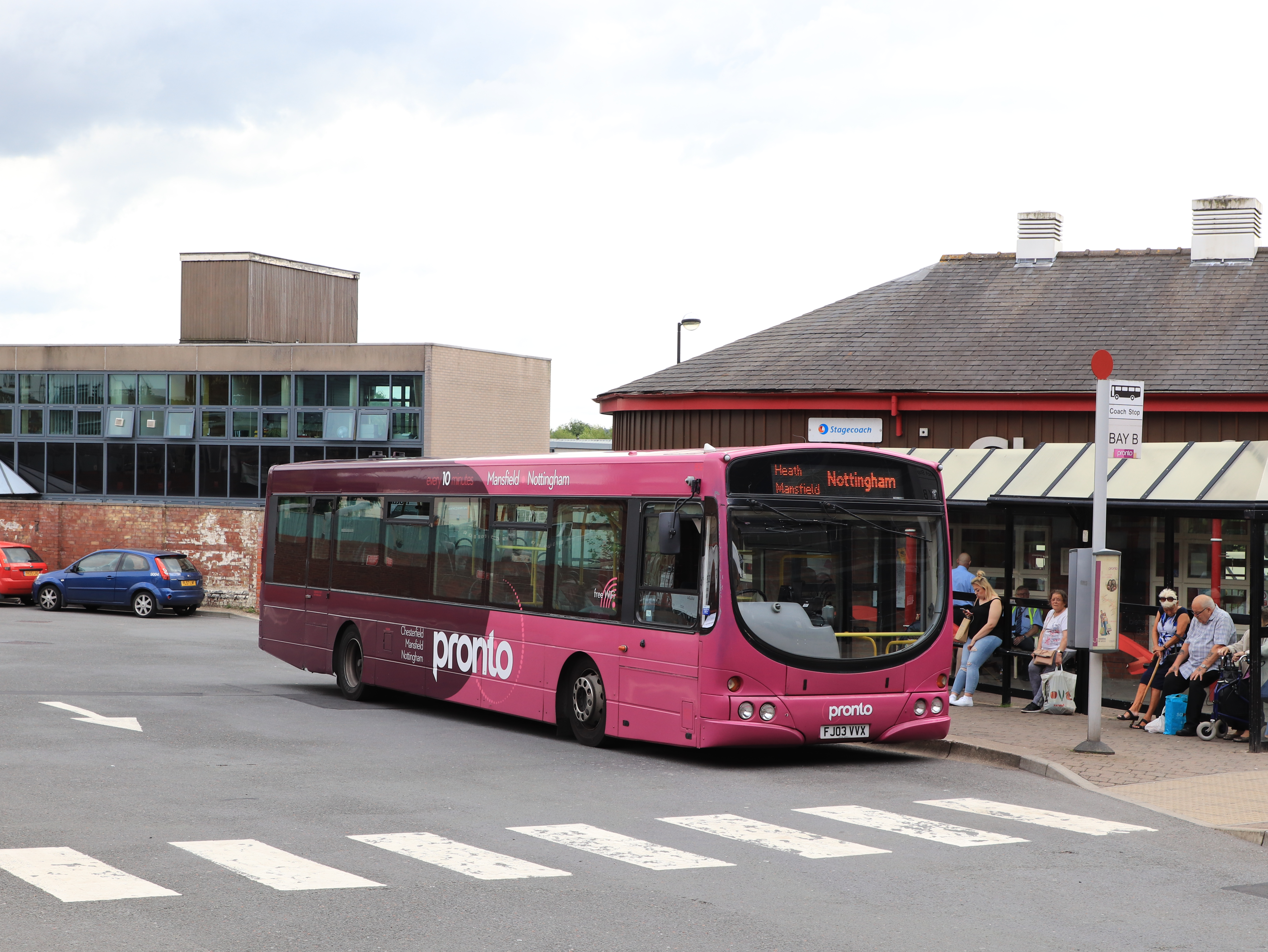
Trentbarton Pronto bus in Chesterfield in July 2019

The "Pronto" brand was launched in 2005 and was shared by Stagecoach East Midlands and Trent Barton, who jointly operated the route as replacements for their competing 737 and 747 services. Some tickets issued by the two companies were valid on all services, while others were only accepted on services operated by one company.

In 2012, there was a dispute between the two operators resulting in Stagecoach timing its services to run five minutes before the Trent Barton services. It was short-lived, and consistent headways were restored.

In June 2018, Stagecoach upgraded their operation of the Pronto to double-decker operation, launching eleven new Alexander Dennis Enviro400 MMCs on the route to replace existing single-deck Alexander Dennis Enviro300s.

In February 2020, Trent Barton withdrew from the route, leaving Stagecoach East Midlands as the sole operator.

Due to the COVID-19 pandemic, the Mansfield-Nottingham section of the route was temporarily reduced from every 10 minutes to every 15 minutes in 2021, though the change has since been reversed in September 2024.

== Route ==
The route operates between Chesterfield and Nottingham via Mansfield. From Monday to Saturday between Chesterfield and Mansfield, the service is half-hourly, while between Mansfield and Nottingham the service operates every 10 minutes. On Sundays the service runs hourly from Chesterfield to Mansfield, and half-hourly between Mansfield and Nottingham.

== Incidents ==
In October 2019, three buses in a row failed to pick up a wheelchair user who was waiting at a bus stop in Mansfield. Following a complaint, Stagecoach apologised and stated that two of its drivers would face disciplinary action.

On 16 December 2024, a Pronto double-decker bus carrying 20 passengers came off the A60 road near Ravenshead and fell into a ditch, ultimately colliding with a tree. No injuries were reported following the incident.
