= Pronto condoms =

Condom designed for quick use

Pronto condoms are a brand of sheath released in South Africa, designed by Willem van Rensburg. The outside protective packaging acts as the condom applicator as well, which reduces the time needed to use the condom. The designer was inspired to create a new style of condom because, according to him, people find the slow process of applying a condom is "a passion-killer and they're willing to take their chances." (with reference to unprotected sex).
