= Chrysler CCV =

Chrysler concept car

The Chrysler CCV (CCV stands for Composite Concept Vehicle) was a concept car designed by Bryan Nesbitt to illustrate new means of construction suitable for developing nations.

The car is a tall, fairly roomy 4-door hatchback, of modest dimensions. The designers at Chrysler note they were inspired to create a modernized Citroën 2CV.

The Chrysler CCV featured an injection-molded plastic body with a fabric roof and an air-cooled 2-cylinder engine driving the front wheels. It was designed to be cheap and easy to manufacture in countries with poor transportation and utility infrastructure and minimal access to capital and skilled labor. The car's simplicity would have ensured longevity and reliability in harsh conditions and made it easy for owners to do their own maintenance and repair work. Despite its lightweight construction, the CCV performed well in front and rear crash tests, although its lack of structural support in the doors and side pillars would have prevented sales in first-world markets.

The CCV was initially developed in the mid-1990s, and earmarked for production, beginning with a joint venture operation in China. However, logistical problems with the injection molding process combined with the rationalization that occurred following Chrysler's 1998 takeover by Daimler-Benz to effectively kill the project. Techniques developed to manufacture CCV bodyshells were ultimately utilized in the production of plastic hardtops for the Jeep Wrangler.

Although the CCV project was essentially terminated in 1998, Chrysler Group continues to actively exhibit the several prototypes produced at a variety of venues, including at the Museum of Modern Art in New York City in 2000.
