= Plymouth Pronto Spyder =

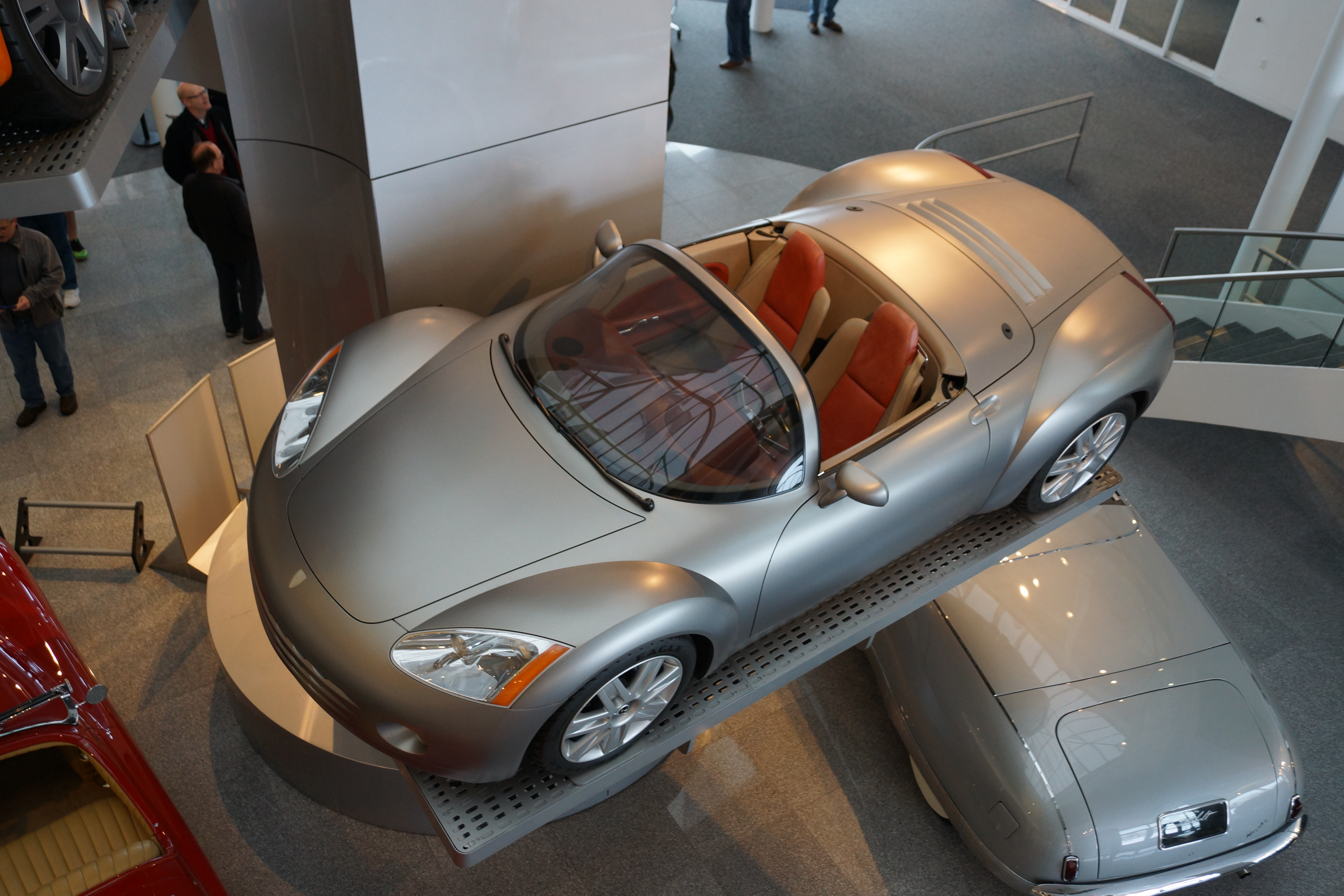
- Plymouth Pronto Spyder at the now closed Walter P. Chrysler Museum

Overview
- Type: Concept car
- Manufacturer: Plymouth
- Production: 1998

Body and chassis
- Body style: 2-door convertible
- Layout: RMR layout

Powertrain
- Engine: 2.4 L turbocharged I4
- Transmission: 5-speed manual

Dimensions
- Curb weight: 2,700 lb (1,225 kg)

The Plymouth Pronto Spyder was a 2-door roadster concept that debuted in 1998, using a mid-mounted, turbocharged, 2.4 L, 225 hp (168 kW), 4-cylinder engine and a five-speed manual transmission.

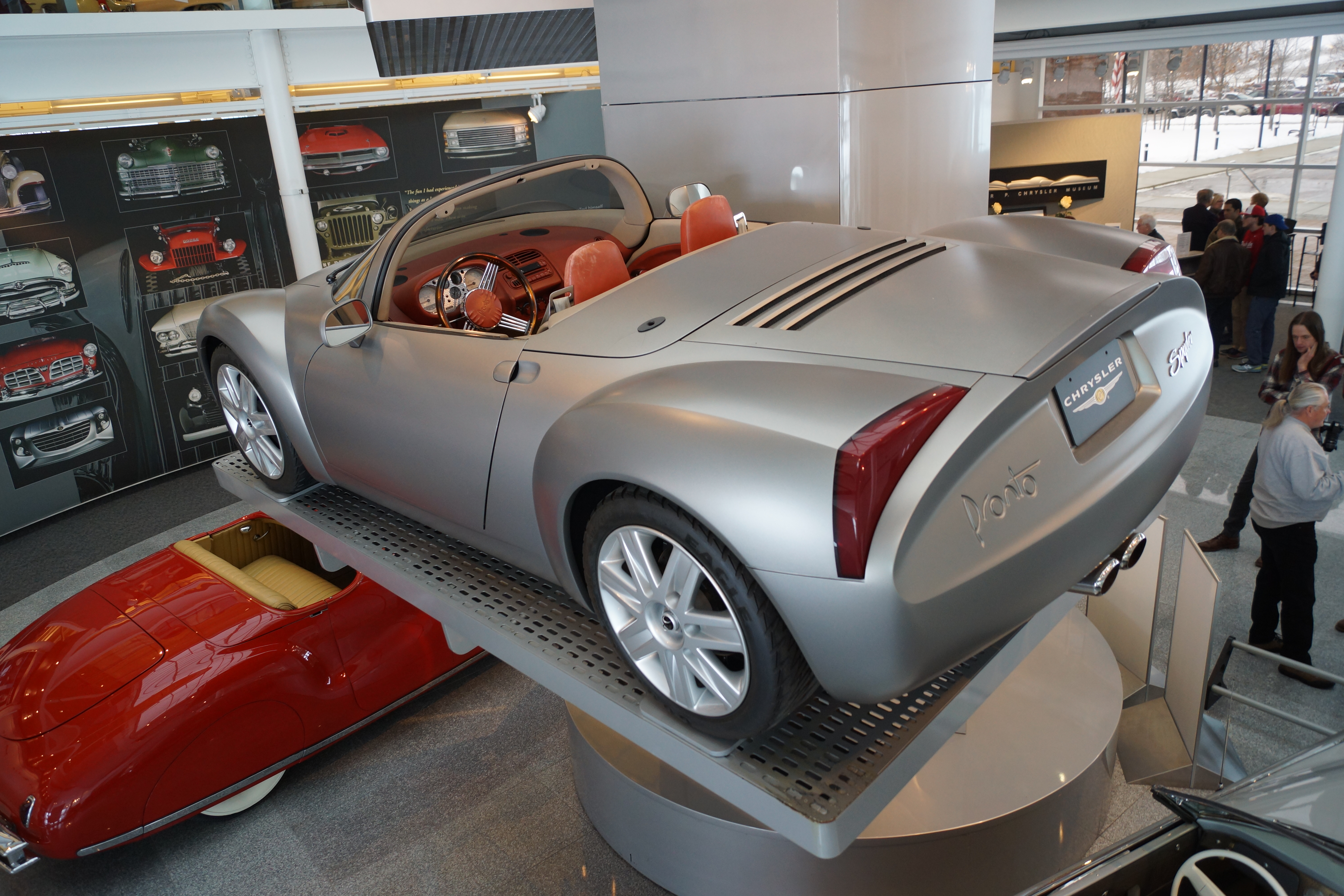
Pronto Spyder rear end

Styled to recall European roadsters, the Pronto Spyder's bodywork used lightweight recycled materials, largely polyethylene terephthalate, or PET, over a steel chassis. The vehicle weighed 2,700 lb (1,225 kg). The interior used spray-applied color, in red, and a tortoise-shell steering wheel rim, subsequently used on the Chrysler 300C.

To enter production, the concept would have needed to meet safety regulations, have better body stiffness (the A-pillar would need revision), suspension travel clearance for the wheelhouse, and rear-view mirrors, among other changes.
