= American Motors Corporation =

Defunct American automobile company (1954–1988)

- Logo from 1970 until 1987

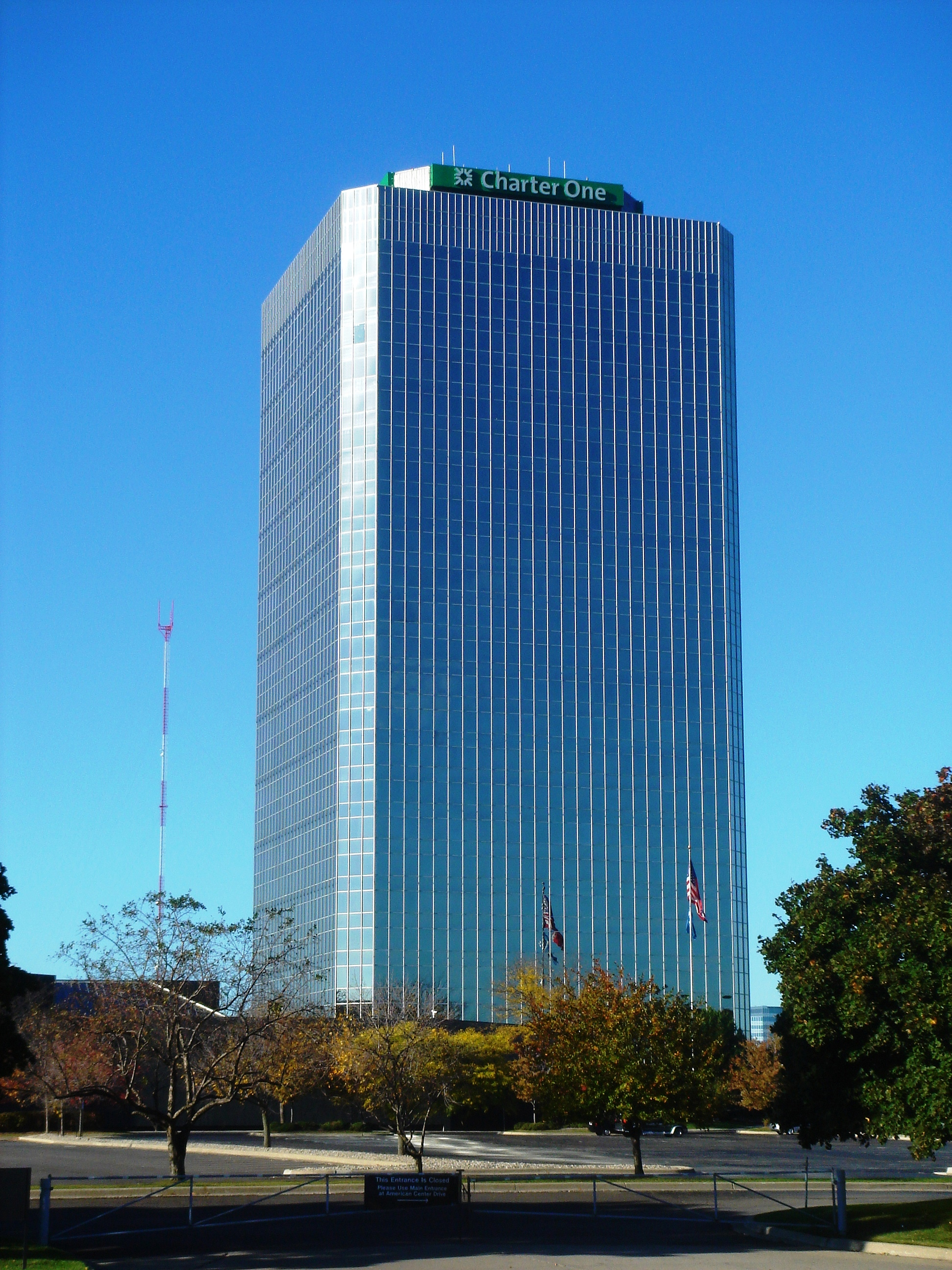
- American Center, headquarters of American Motors Corporation from 1975 to 1987
- Industry: Automotive
- Predecessor: Hudson Motor Car Company; Thomas B. Jeffery Company; Nash-Kelvinator Corporation; Kaiser Jeep; Kaiser Motors; Willys Overland
- Founded: May 1, 1954; 72 years ago
- Founder: George W. Mason
- Defunct: June 20, 1988; 38 years ago
- Fate: AMC was renamed Jeep Eagle Corporation then merged into Chrysler in 1990.
- Successor: Chrysler; Eagle; Jeep Eagle Corporation
- Headquarters: American Center; 27777 Franklin Rd; Southfield, Michigan, 48034; U.S.
- Key people: George W. Romney; Roy Abernethy; Robert B. Evans; Roy D. Chapin Jr.; Dick Teague
- Products: Automobiles; Military vehicles; Buses and delivery vehicles; Sport utility vehicles; Major home appliances; Commercial refrigeration; Lawn care products
- Brands: AMC (1966–1987); AM General (1974–1979); Hudson (1954–1957); Jeep (1970–1987); Metropolitan (1958–1962); Nash (1954–1957); Rambler (1957–1983)
- Parent: Chrysler Corporation (now Stellantis North America)
- Subsidiaries: Kelvinator (1954–1968); Vehículos Automotores Mexicanos (1963–1980); AM General (1971–1983); Shinjin Jeep Motors (1974–1979); Wheel Horse (1974–1986); Arab American Vehicles (1977–1987); Beijing Jeep (1984–1987)

American Motors Corporation (AMC; commonly referred to as American Motors) was an American automobile manufacturing company formed by the merger of Nash-Kelvinator Corporation and Hudson Motor Car Company on May 1, 1954. At the time, it was the largest corporate merger in U.S. history.

American Motors' most similar competitors were those automakers that held similar annual sales levels, such as Studebaker, Packard, Kaiser Motors, and Willys-Overland. Their largest competitors were the Big Three—Ford, General Motors, and Chrysler.

American Motors' production line included small cars—the Rambler American, which began as the Nash Rambler in 1950, Hornet, Gremlin, and Pacer; intermediate and full-sized cars, including the Ambassador, Rambler Classic, Rebel, and Matador; muscle cars, including the Marlin, AMX, and Javelin; and early four-wheel drive variants of the Eagle and the Jeep Wagoneer, the first true crossovers in the U.S. market.

Regarded as "a small company deft enough to exploit special market segments left untended by the giants", American Motors was widely known for the design work of chief stylist Dick Teague, who "had to make do with a much tighter budget than his counterparts at Detroit's Big Three", but "had a knack for making the most of his employer's investment".

After periods of intermittent independent success, Renault acquired a significant interest in American Motors in 1979, and the company was ultimately acquired by Chrysler in 1987.

== 1954 formation ==
American Motors logo used from 1954 until 1967

In January 1954, Nash-Kelvinator Corporation began the acquisition of the Hudson Motor Car Company (in what was called a merger). The new corporation would be called the American Motors Corporation. An earlier corporation with the same name, co-founded by Louis Chevrolet, had existed in Plainfield, New Jersey, from 1916 through 1922 before merging into the Bessemer–American Motors Corporation.

The Nash-Kelvinator/Hudson deal was a straight stock transfer (three shares of Hudson listed at 11 1/8, for two shares of American Motors and one share of Nash-Kelvinator listed at 17 3/8, for one share of American Motors) and finalized in the spring of 1954, forming the fourth-biggest auto company in the U.S. with assets of US$355 million and more than $100 million in working capital. The new company retained Hudson CEO A.E. Barit as a consultant and he took a seat on the board of directors. Nash's George W. Mason became president and CEO.

Mason, the architect of the merger, believed that the survival of the U.S.'s remaining independent automakers depended on their joining to form one multiple-brand company capable of challenging the Big Three as an equal. The "frantic 1953–54 Ford/GM price war" devastated the remaining "independent" automakers. The reasons for the merger between Nash and Hudson included helping cut costs and strengthen their sales organizations to meet the intense competition expected from autos' Big Three.

One quick result from the merger was the doubling up with Nash on purchasing and production, allowing Hudson to cut prices an average of $155 on the Wasp line, and up to $204 on the more expensive Hornet models. After the merger, AMC had its first profitable quarter during the second three months of 1955, earning $1,592,307, compared to a loss of $3,848,667 during the same period in the previous year. Mason also entered into informal discussions with James J. Nance of Packard to outline his strategic vision. Interim plans were made for American Motors to buy Packard Ultramatic automatic transmissions and Packard V8 engines for certain American Motors products.

In July 1954, Packard acquired Studebaker. The new Studebaker-Packard Corporation (S-P) made the new 320 cu in (5.2 L) Packard V8 engine and Packard's Ultramatic automatic transmission available to American Motors for its 1955 Nash Ambassador and Hudson Hornet models. When Mason died in 1954, George W. Romney succeeded him. Ironically, Romney had once been offered Nance's job. In 1948, Romney received offers from Packard for the post of chief operating officer and from Nash for the number two position in the company. Although the Packard offer would have paid more, Romney decided to work under Mason because he thought Nash had a brighter future. Studebaker-Packard president James Nance refused to consider merging with American Motors unless he could take the top position (Mason and Nance were former competitors as heads of the Kelvinator and Hotpoint, respectively), and a week after Mason's death, Romney announced "there are no mergers under way either directly or indirectly." Romney agreed with Mason's commitment to buy S-P products. Mason and Nance had agreed that S-P would endeavor to purchase parts from American Motors in return, but S-P did not do so. As the Packard engines and transmissions were comparatively expensive, American Motors began development of its own V8. American Motors also spent US$40 million developing its Double Safe Single Unit monocoque, which debuted in the 1956 model year. In mid-1956, the 352 cu in (5.8 L) Packard V8 and TwinUltramatic transmission were phased out and replaced by American Motors's new V8 and by GM Hydra-Matic and Borg-Warner transmissions.

== Product development in the 1950s ==
=== Product consolidation ===
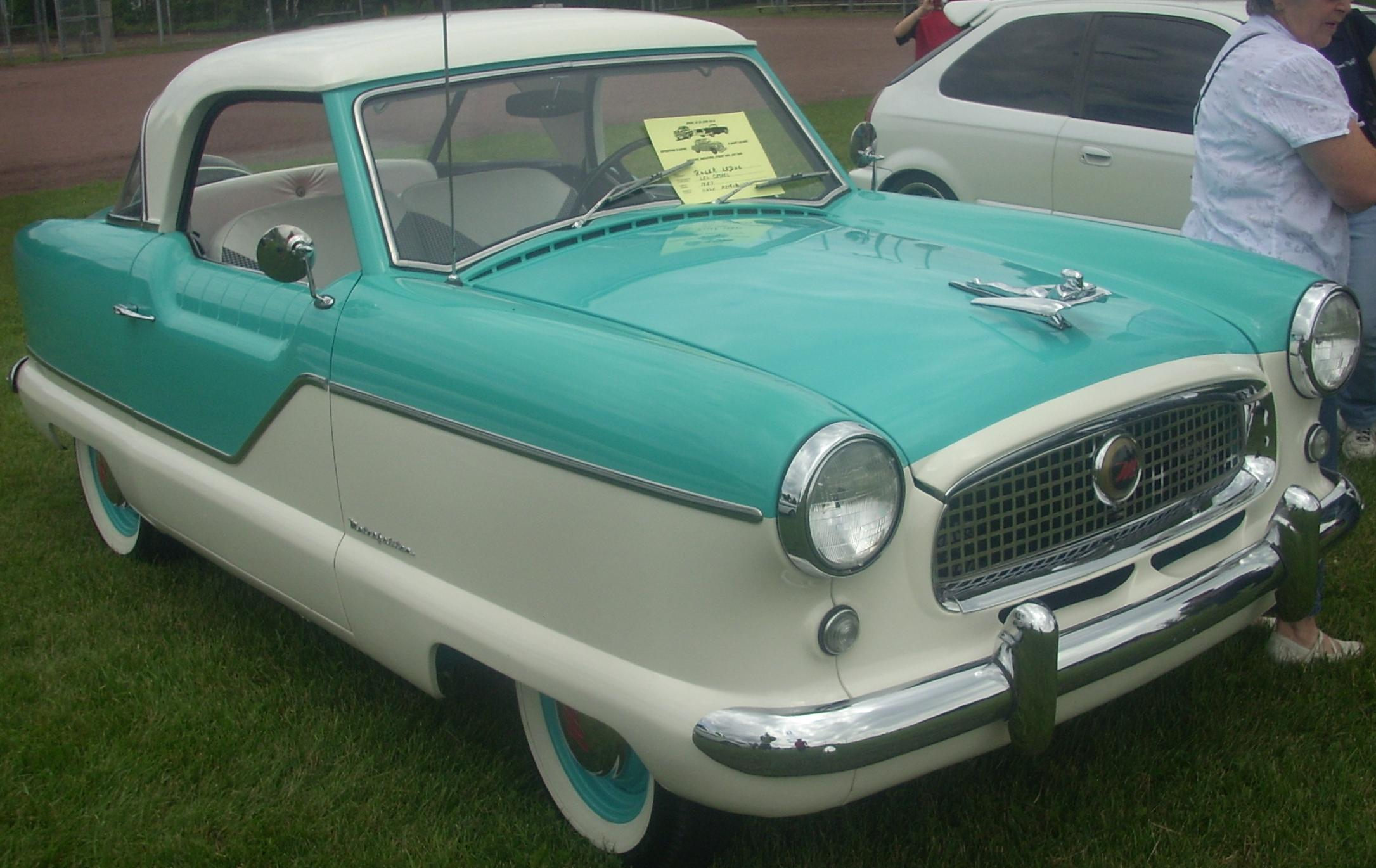
1957 Nash Metropolitan

American Motors combined the Nash and Hudson product lines under a common manufacturing strategy in 1955, with the production of Nashes and Hudsons consolidated at the Nash plant in Kenosha. The Detroit Hudson plant was converted to military contract production and eventually sold. The separate Nash and Hudson dealer networks were retained. The Hudsons were redesigned to harmonize with Nash's body styles.

The fast-selling Nash Rambler model was sold as a Nash and a Hudson in 1955 and 1956. These badge-engineered Ramblers, and similarly the small Metropolitans, were identical except for the hubcaps, nameplates, and other minor trim.

The pre-existing full-size Nash product line was continued with the Nash Statesman restyled as the "new" Hudson Wasp and the Nash Ambassador restyled as the Hudson Hornet. Although the cars shared the same body shell, they were at least as different from one another as Chevrolet and Pontiac. Hudsons and Nashes each used their engines as they had previously: the Hudson Hornet continued to offer the 308 cu in (5.0 L) I6 that had powered the (NASCAR) champion during the early 1950s; the Wasp now used the former engine of the Hudson Jet.

The Nash Ambassador and Statesman continued with overhead- valve and L-head sixes, respectively. Hudson and Nash cars had different front suspensions. Trunk lids were interchangeable, but other body panels, rear window glass, dash panels, and braking systems differed. The Hudson Hornet, Wasp, and their Nash counterparts had improved ride, visibility, and fuel economy because of their lighter unitized Nash body.

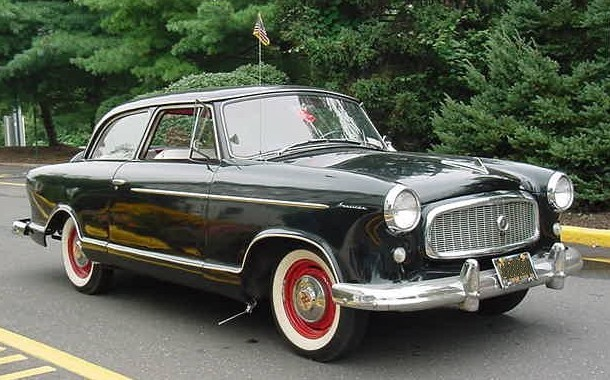
1959 Rambler American Club Sedan

The larger Nash and Hudson range did not sell well, and AMC lost money each year. Dismayed with the results, Romney decided in 1956 that the company's future lay with the compact Rambler line. Romney halted production on the new large cars and focused entirely on the new Rambler Six and V8 introducing them in 1956, despite being scheduled for a 1957 release. Sales of the new Ramblers were poor, and sales of the Hudson and Nash models were almost non-existent, resulting in a $31.7 million operating loss for 1956. Sales improved in 1957, but the company saw a $11.8 million loss. In response, Romney launched a massive public relations campaign, traveling 70,000 miles (112,654 kilometres) nationwide in 12 months. Romney spoke at union halls, dinners, churches, fairgrounds, and radio and TV stations. He was anywhere where he could get the word out about Rambler. Rambler sales took off in 1958, up 58.7%, and 425 new dealers were signed up. As a result, 1958 became AMC's first year of profitability since its formation, with $28 million in earnings. The Nash and Hudson brands were dropped, and Rambler became a marque in its own right and the mainstay of the company. The popular British-built Metropolitan subcompact continued as a standalone brand until it was discontinued in 1961. The prototype 1958 Nash Ambassador/Hudson Hornet, built on a stretched Rambler platform, was renamed at the last minute as "Ambassador by Rambler". To round out the model line, American Motors reintroduced the previous 1955, 100 in (2,540 mm) wheelbase Nash Rambler as the new Rambler American with only a few modifications. This gave Rambler a compact lineup that included the reintroduced American, the 108 in (2,743 mm) wheelbase Rambler Six and Rebel V8, as well as the 117 in (2,972 mm) wheelbase Ambassador.

=== The "dinosaur-fighter" ===
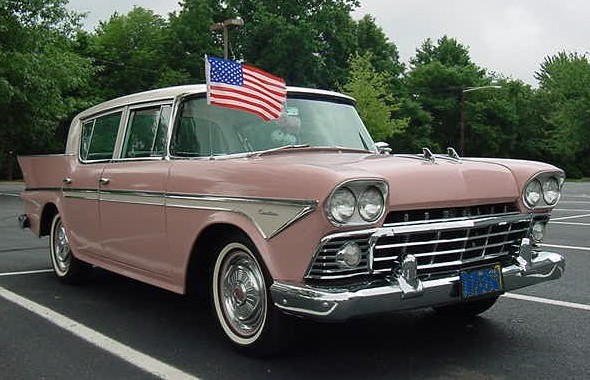
1958 Rambler Custom 4-Door Sedan

Sales of Ramblers soared in the late 1950s partly because of American Motors' focus on the compact car and its marketing efforts. These included sponsoring the hugely popular Walt Disney anthology television series and as an exhibitor at the Disneyland theme park in Anaheim, California. George Romney himself pitched the Rambler product in television commercials.

While the "Big Three" introduced ever-larger cars, American Motors followed a "dinosaur-fighter" strategy. George W. Romney's leadership focused the company on the compact car, a fuel-efficient vehicle 20 years before there was a real need for them. This gave Romney a high profile in the media. Two core strategic factors came into play: (1) the use of shared components in American Motors products and (2) a refusal to participate in the Big Three's restyling race. This cost-control policy helped Rambler develop a reputation for building solid economy cars. Company officials were confident in the changing market and in 1959 announced a $10 million (US$110,445,205 today) expansion of its Kenosha complex (to increase annual straight-time capacity from 300,000 to 440,000 cars). A letter to shareholders in 1959 claimed that the introduction of new compact cars by American Motors' large domestic competitors (for the 1960 model year) "signals the end of big-car domination in the U.S." and that American Motors predicts small-car sales in the U.S. may reach three million units by 1963.

American Motors was also beginning to experiment with non-gasoline-powered automobiles. On April 1, 1959, American Motors and Sonotone Corporation announced a joint research effort to consider producing an electric car that was to be powered by a "self-charging" battery. Sonotone had the technology for making sintered plate nickel–cadmium batteries that can be recharged very rapidly and are lighter than a typical automobile lead–acid battery.

In 1959, American Motors hired designer Dick Teague, who had previously worked for General Motors, Packard, and Chrysler; after Edmund E. Anderson left the company in 1961, Teague was named principal designer and in 1964, vice president.

== Changing focus in the 1960s ==
=== Innovation ===
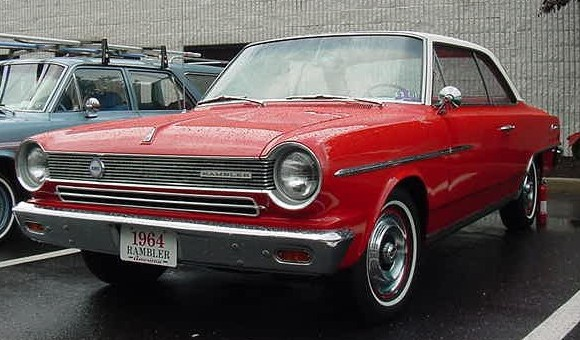
1964 Rambler American 440-H

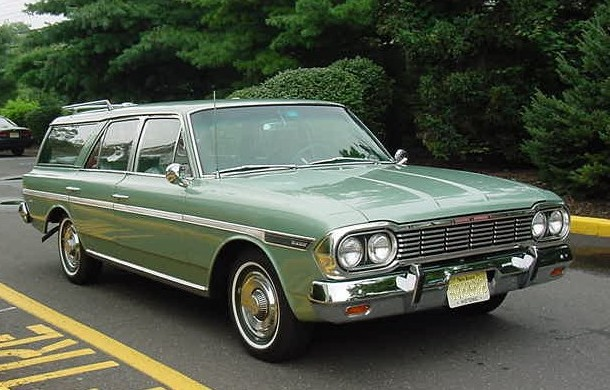
1964 Rambler Classic 770

To stay competitive, American Motors produced a wide range of products during the 1960s and added innovations long before the "Big Three" introduced them.

For example, the Rambler Classic was equipped with a standard tandem master cylinder in 1962 that provided stopping ability even if there was a failure in the brake system. Only Cadillac also included this safety feature six years before U.S. safety regulations required it on all cars.

Rambler also was an early pioneer in offering an automatic shift indicator sequence (P R N D2 D1 L, where if one selected "D2", the car started in second gear, while "1" began in first gear) on its "Flash-O-Matic" transmission which is similar to today's "PRNDSL" shift pattern, made mandatory for the 1968 model year cars, which required a neutral position between reverse and drive, while General Motors still offered a shift selector that had reverse immediately next to low gear (PNDSLR) well into the 1960s.

Unique in the U. S. automotive industry, American Motors offered adjustable front seat backrests from their Nash-origin, and in 1964, the Classic and Ambassador were equipped with standard dual reclining front seats nearly a decade before the Big Three offered them as options. Bendix disc brakes were made standard on the Marlin and optional on other models in 1965. This made the Marlin one of the first modern American cars with standard disc brakes, while the Big Three did not offer them until the early 1970s on most of their models to meet Federal Motor Vehicle Safety Standards.

In the early part of the decade, sales were strong, thanks in no small part to the company's history of building small cars, which came into vogue in 1961. In both 1960 and 1961, Ramblers ranked in third place among U. S. automobile sales, on the strength of small-car sales, even in the face of a lot of new competition. Romney's strategic focus was very successful, as reflected in the firm's healthy profits year after year. The company became completely debt-free. The financial success allowed the company to reach an agreement on August 26, 1961, with the United Auto Workers for a profit sharing plan that was new in the automobile industry. Its new three-year labor contract included generous annual improvement pay increases, and automatic cost-of-living raises. However, in 1962, Romney resigned to run for Governor of Michigan. His replacement was Roy Abernethy, American Motors' successful sales executive.

By 1964, Studebaker production in the United States had ended, and its Canadian operations ceased in 1966. The "Big Three", plus the smaller American Motors, Kaiser Jeep, International Harvester, Avanti, and Checker companies were the remaining North American auto manufacturers.

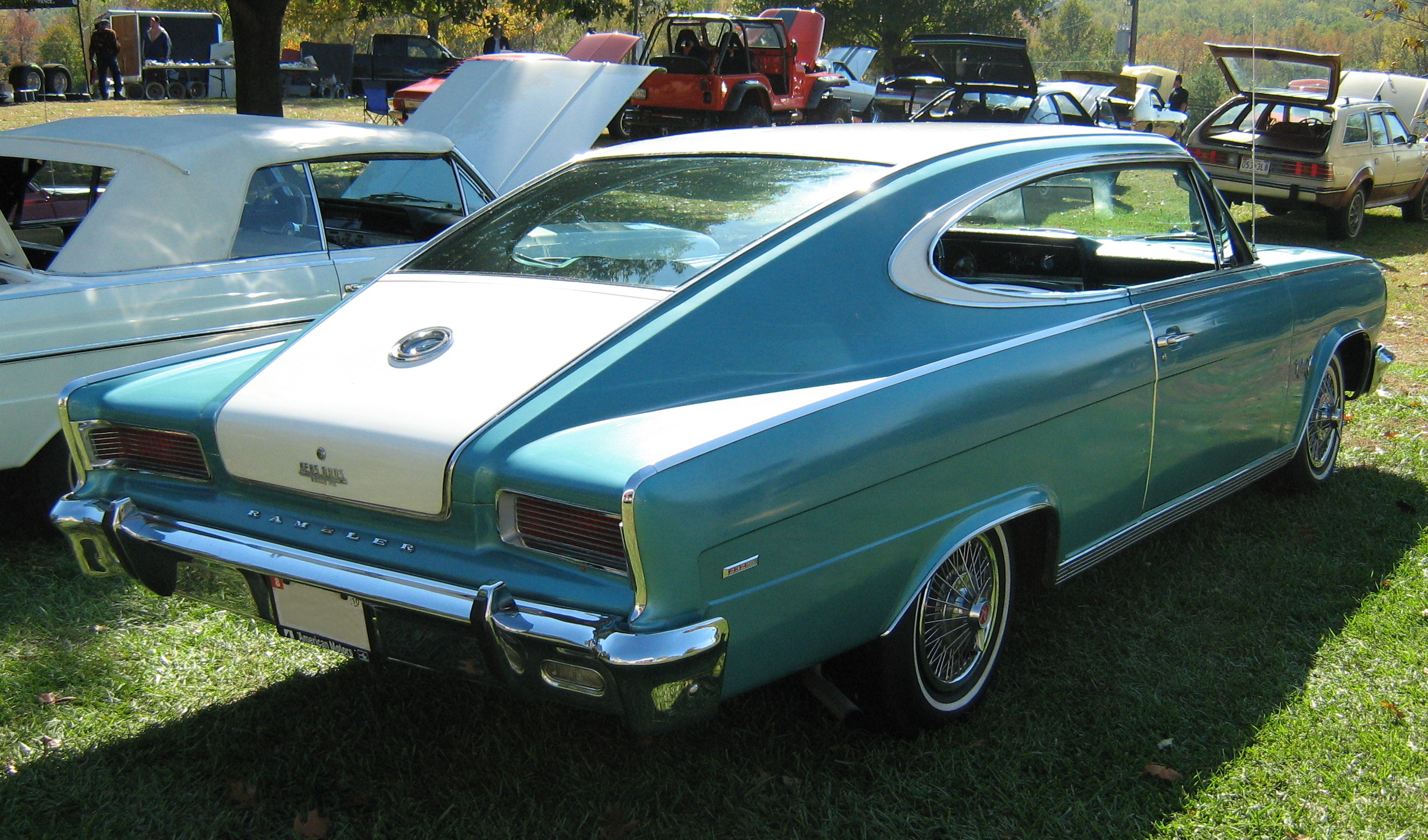
1965 Rambler Marlin

Abernethy believed that American Motors's reputation of building reliable, economical cars could translate into a new strategy that could follow AMC buyers as they traded into larger, more expensive vehicles. American Motors, in reality, had produced large cars throughout its history. The Rambler Ambassadors were as large as a full-sized Ford or Chevy. There was only an absence of largest-sized cars from the American Motors lineup in 1963 and 1964 The first cars bearing his signature were the 1965 models. The 1965 models were a major makeover of the new platform that had just been introduced in 1963. These were a longer Ambassador series and new convertibles for the larger models. During mid-year, a fastback, called the Marlin, was added. It competed directly with cars like the Dodge Charger, but AMC's "family-sized" fastback emphasized personal-luxury.

=== Tough choices ===
The continuing quest "in the business world's toughest race – the grinding contest against the Big Three automobile makers" also meant annual styling changes requiring large expenditures. American Motors's management total confidence "that the new 1965 models would stem a bothersome decline" actually began falling behind in share of sales.

Moreover, a new line of redesigned cars in the full and mid-sized markets was launched in the fall of 1966. The cars won acclaim for their fluid styling, and Abernethy's ideas did work as Ambassador sales increased significantly. However, the dated designs of the Rambler Americans hurt its sales, which offset gains from Ambassador sales. There were quality control problems with introducing the new full-sized cars and persistent rumors of the company's demise because of its precarious cash flow. Consumer Reports' negative ratings for American Motors' safety did not help.

During this time, AMC's international sales were expanding. From only 18,000 cars five years ago, the 1965 model year AMC sold 74,420 vehicles in Canada, Europe, and Latin America. AMC remained the most significant U.S. seller of autos in both France and Germany.

Abernethy also called for the de-emphasis of the Rambler brand because he believed the public associated it too strongly with economy cars and that it was hindering the sale of American Motors' other models at a time when mid and luxury car sales were robust. As a result, he ordered that for 1966, the Ambassador and Marlin were to be badged purely as a product of American Motors. The strategy shift at first seemed to be working because sales of the redesigned 1965 and 1966 Ambassadors improved, even as AMC's overall production decreased from the record level achieved in 1963. However, corporate earnings per share were a meager 27 cents per share, the lowest since AMC made its famous compact car comeback in 1958. Investors received a message of the changing fortune of the automaker when the company's 1966 annual financial report was delivered in a plain brown wrapper, instead of the previous year's glossy cover.

American Motors logo used from 1967 until 1970

A completely new design was also slated for the larger 1967 models. This strategy added $60 million in retooling costs, a significant stretch for the company. The latest models shared fewer parts and were more expensive to build. Abernethy continued his objective to position the new Rebel and Ambassador designs on an equal basis with competitive economy models marketed by the Big Three.

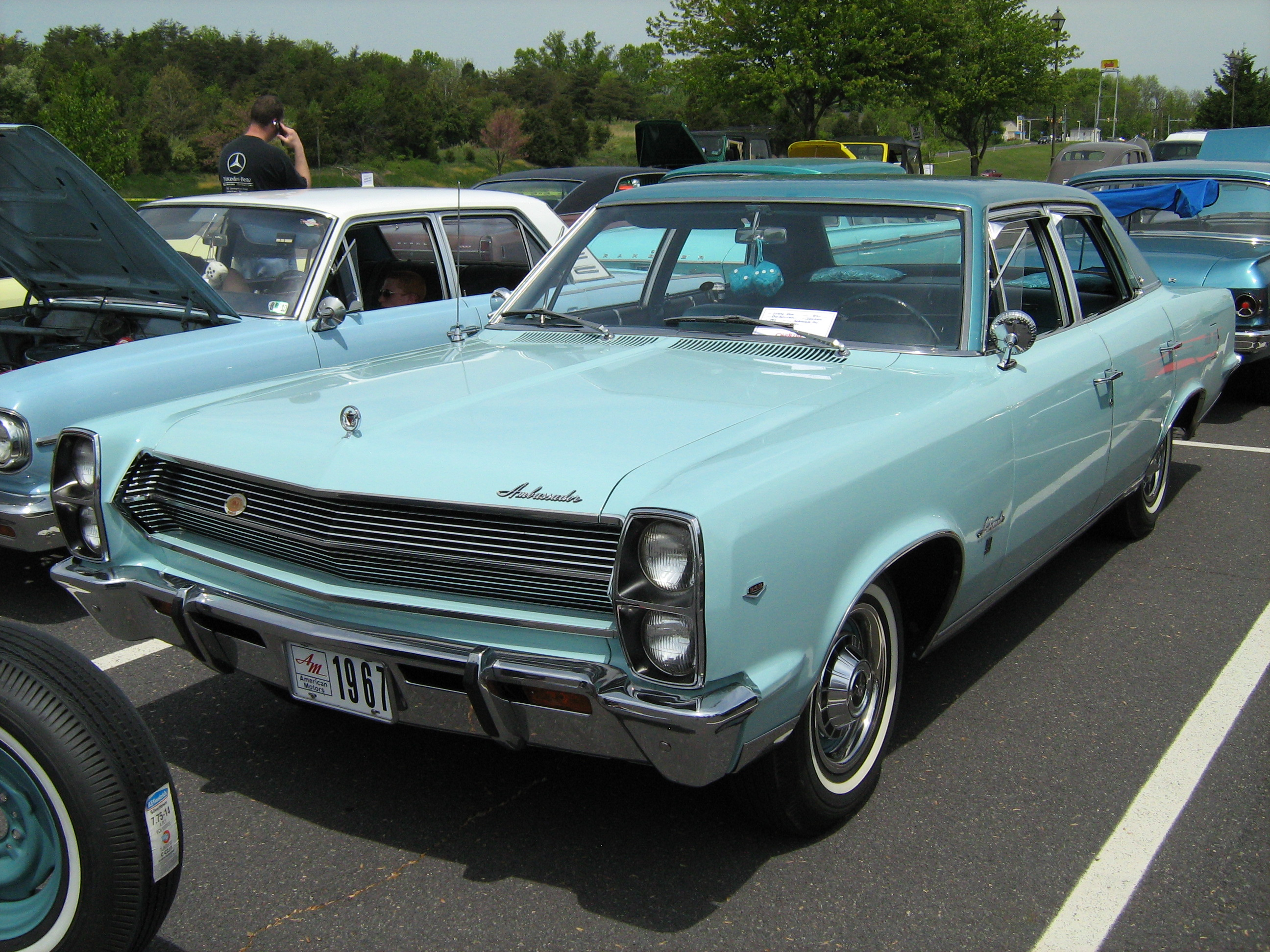
1967 Ambassador 990

American Motors did not have their own electric car program as did the Big Three, and after some negotiation, a contract was drawn in 1967 with Gulton Industries to develop a new battery based on lithium and a speed controller designed by Victor Wouk. A nickel-cadmium battery powered 1969 Rambler station wagon demonstrated the power systems that according to the scientist was a "wonderful car". This was also the start of other "plug-in"-type experimental American Motors vehicles developed with Gulton – the Amitron city concept car and later the similar Electron.

Although the new models were well received by the motor industry media, the last quarter sales for AMC ended September 30, 1966 (AMC was not on a calendar fiscal year) were disappointing. The company recorded a balance sheet loss of $12,648,000 for the year before Tax Credits and deferred Tax Assets. By this time the board had lost confidence in Abernethy due to his vast spending which had unstabilized the company and each year under his leadership the company had suffered substantial financial losses. As a result, Abernethy was forced into taking an "early retirement" from American Motors on January 9, 1967. Abernethy was replaced by Roy D. Chapin Jr. (son of Hudson Motors founder Roy D. Chapin). Chapin quickly instituted changes to American Motors's offerings and tried to regain market share by focusing on younger demographic markets. Chapin's first decision was to cut the price of the Rambler to within $200 of the basic Volkswagen Beetle. Innovative marketing ideas included making air conditioning standard on all 1968 Ambassador models (available as a delete option). This made American Motors the first U.S. automaker to make air conditioning standard equipment on a line of cars, preceding even luxury makes such as Lincoln, Imperial, and Cadillac.

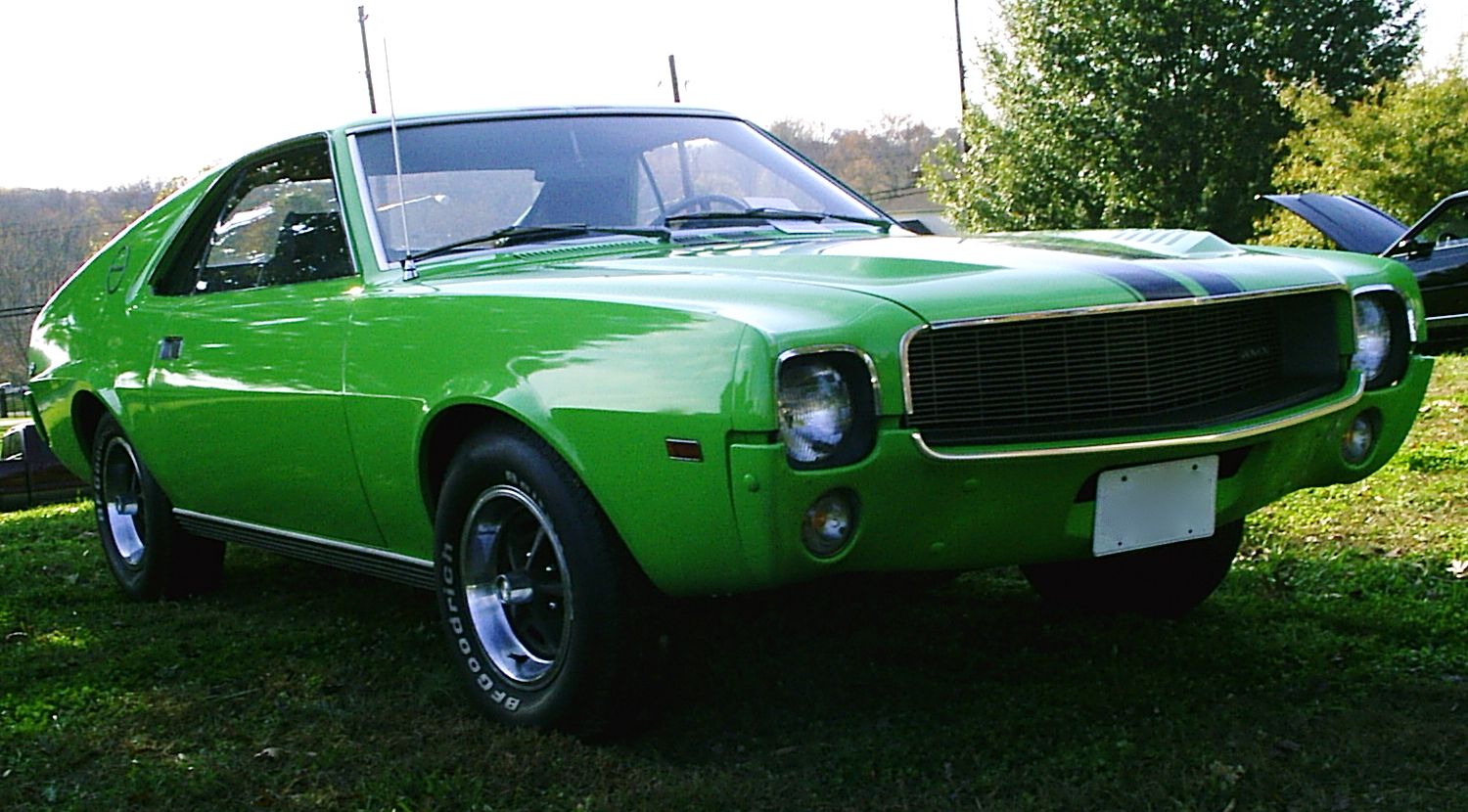
1969 American Motors AMX

The company introduced exciting entries for the decade's muscle car boom, most notably the AMX. At the same time, the Javelin served as the company's entrant into the sporty pony car market created by the Plymouth Barracuda and the Ford Mustang. Additional operating cash was derived in 1968 through the sale of Kelvinator Appliance, once one of the firm's core operating units. The Kelvinator divestiture left American Motors a downsized company solely manufacturing automobiles.

The Rambler marque was discontinued for the larger 1968 domestic models, leaving only the small Rambler American as the last product to bear the name through 1969. The Rambler brand continued to be used only for export markets, with Mexico being the last market to use it in 1983. From 1970, American Motors was the brand used for all American Motors passenger cars, and all vehicles from that date bore the American Motors name and the new corporate logo. However, "American Motors" and "AMC" were used interchangeably in corporate literature well into the 1980s. The branding issue was further complicated when the company's Eagle all-wheel drive passenger cars were marketed as the American Eagle in the 1980s.

== 1970s product developments ==
=== Jeep and AM General ===
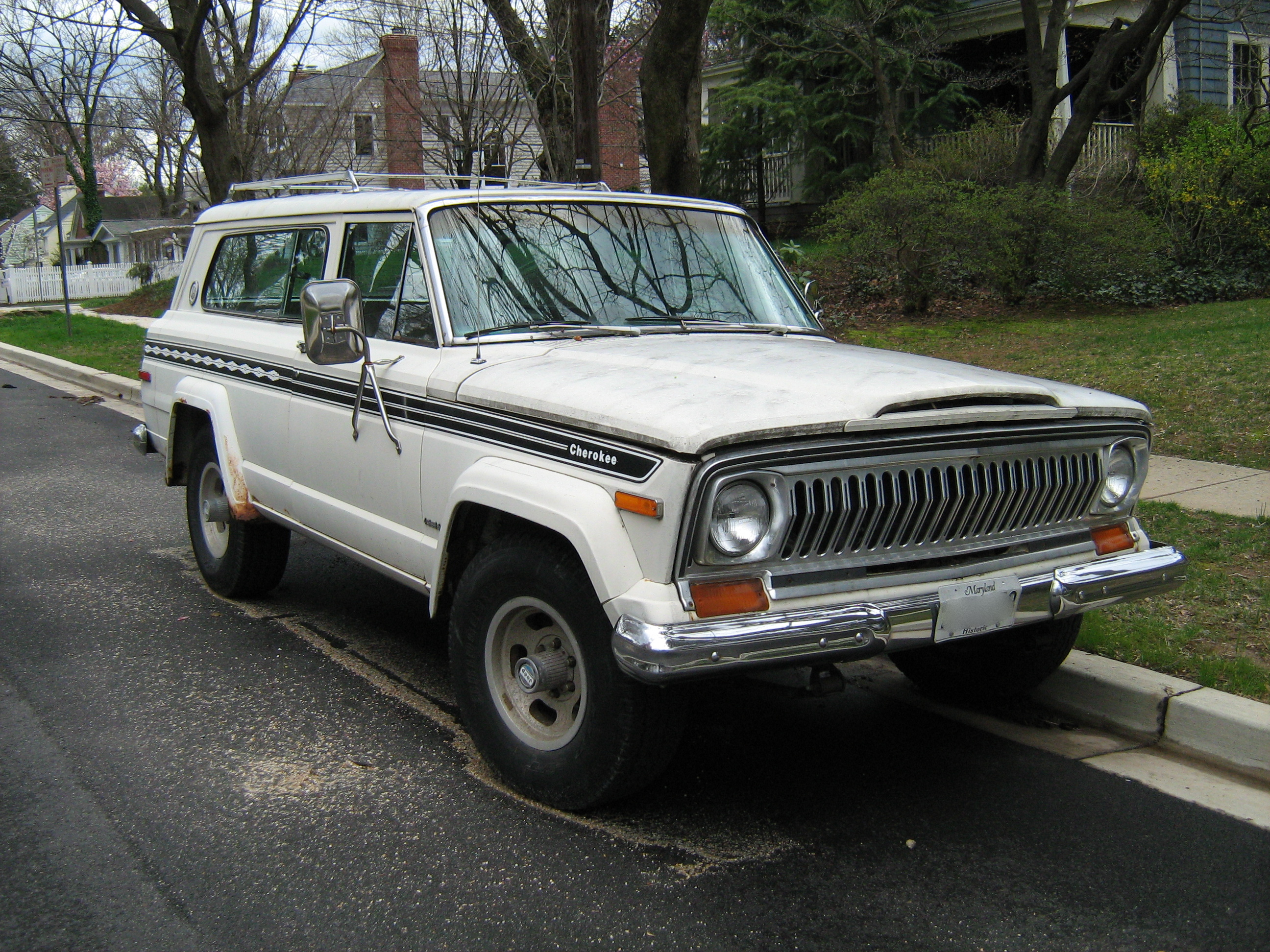
Jeep Cherokee (SJ) Chief S

In the late 1960s, Kaiser Industries Corporation decided to leave the automotive industry and sought a buyer for its money-losing Kaiser Jeep division. American Motors' vice president for manufacturing, Gerald C. Meyers, headed the team sent to evaluate Kaiser's Jeep factories. Although opposed by AMC's top management, Chapin made a significant decision in February 1970 to purchase Kaiser Jeep for $70 million. Although it was a gamble, Chapin believed Jeep vehicles would complement American Motors' passenger car business. The Jeep market was also a market in which the Big Three had no presence except for the Ford Bronco and the then-recently introduced Chevrolet K5 Blazer/GMC Jimmy, and the largest competition outside the Big Three came from the International Scout and low-volume imports of the Land Rover, Toyota Land Cruiser, and Nissan Patrol. (The latter being the only Nissan-branded vehicle in the United States until the 1980s when the Datsun name was phased out in favor of Nissan.) Jeep by far had the largest market share of the 4x4 market during this time.

American Motors gained the iconic Jeep brand of light trucks and SUVs, as well as Kaiser-Jeep's government contracts – notably the M151 line of military Jeeps and the DJ-Series postal Jeeps. American Motors also expanded its international network. The military and special products business was reconstituted as "American Motors General Products Division", later reorganized as AM General.

=== Hornet and Gremlin ===
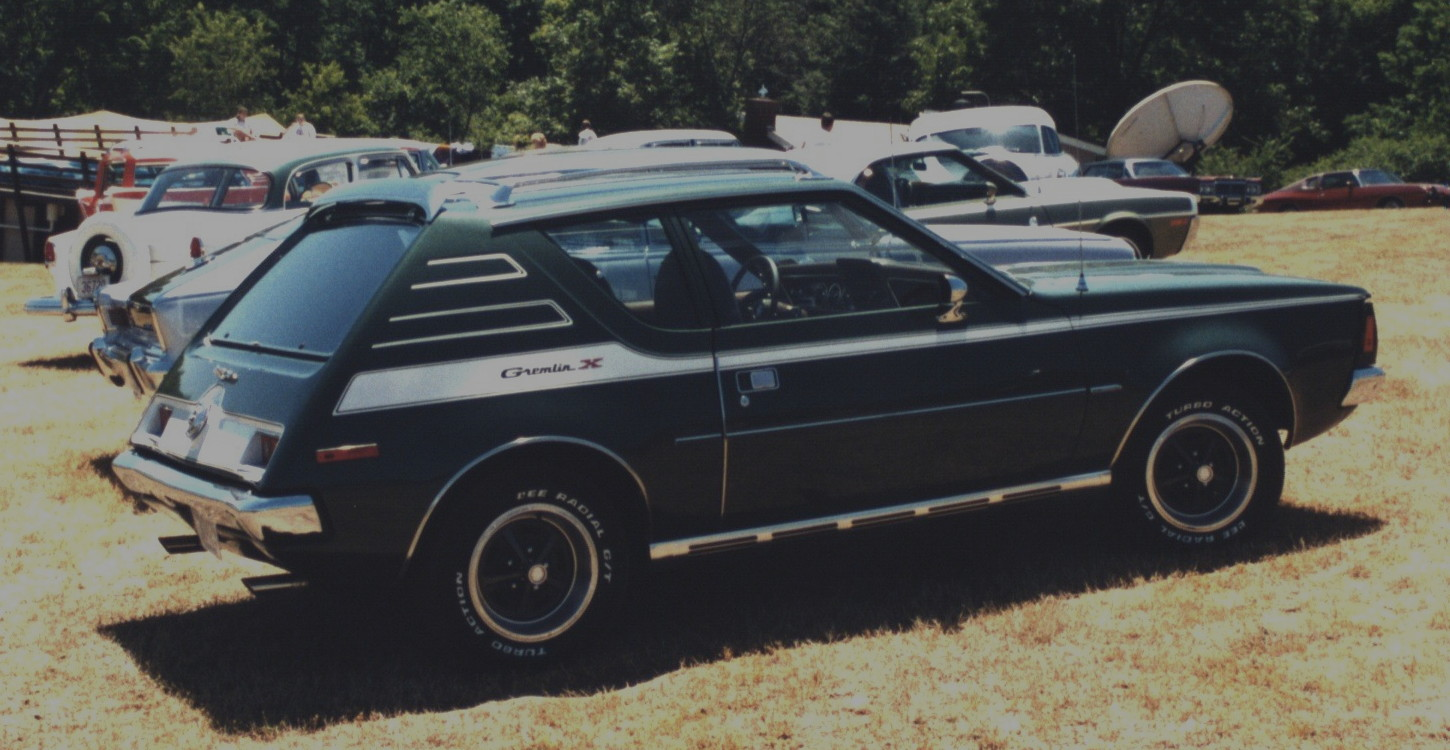
1972 Gremlin X

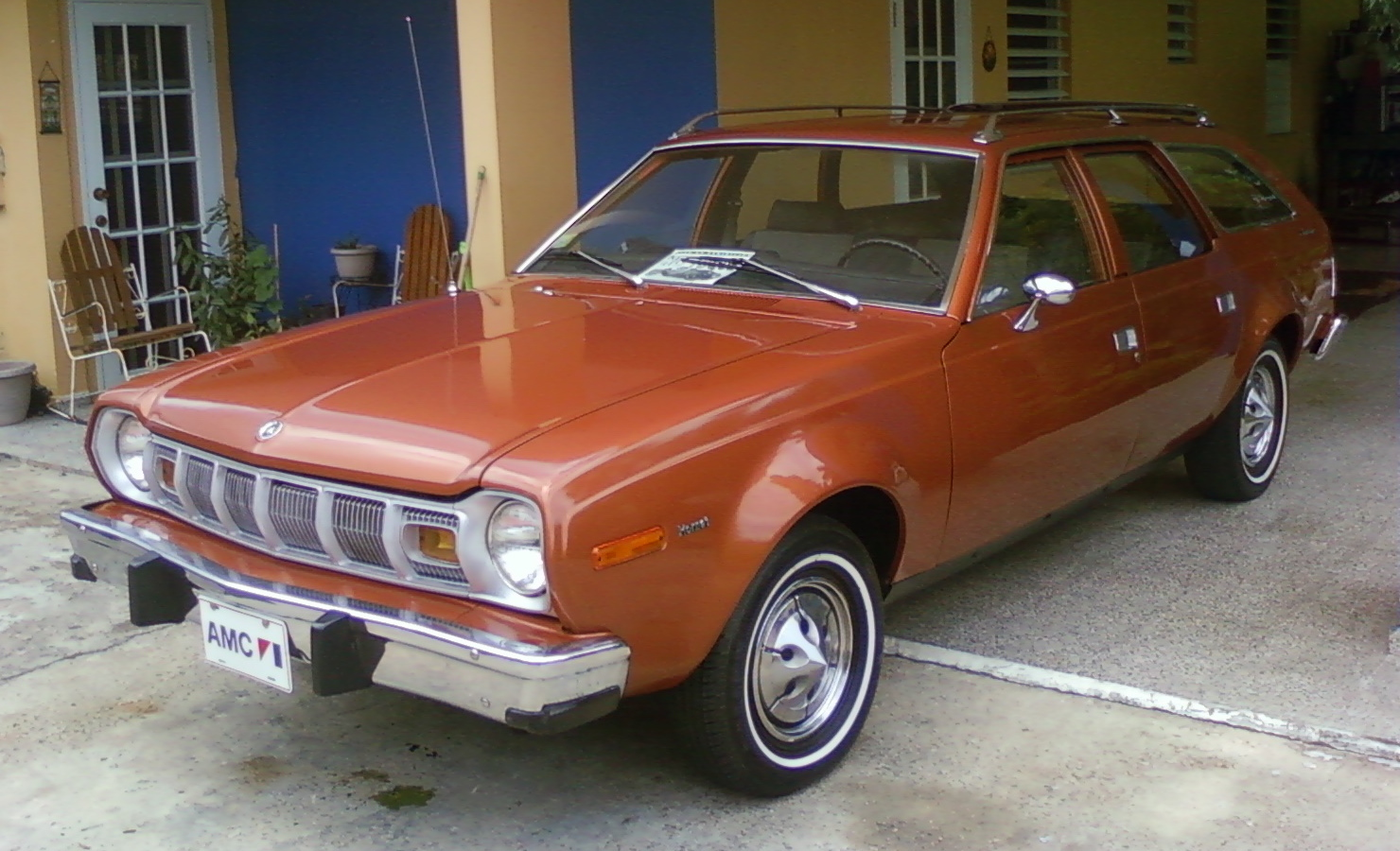
1976 Hornet Sportabout

In 1970, American Motors consolidated all passenger cars under one distinct brand identity and debuted the Hornet range of compact cars. The Hornet and the later Gremlin shared platforms. The Gremlin, the first North American-built subcompact, sold more than 670,000 units from 1970 through 1978. The Hornet became American Motors' best-selling passenger car since the Rambler Classic, with more than 860,000 units sold when production ended in 1977. The Hornet platform continued to be built under various models through 1987.

For a time, both the Hornet and Gremlin could be ordered with Levi's denim interiors.

=== Matador ===
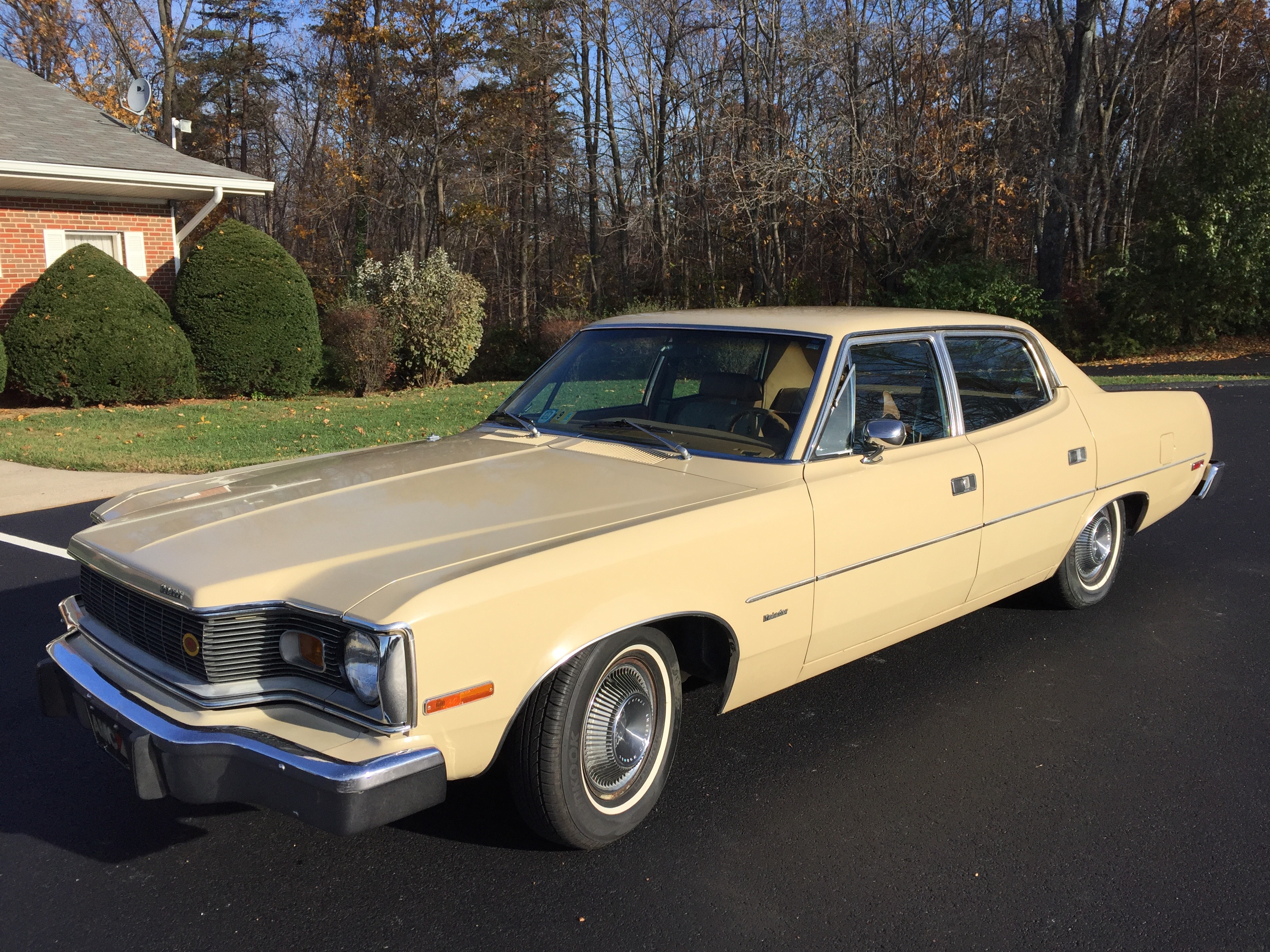
1975 second-generation Matador sedan

The new facelifted, mid-sized AMC Matador replaced the Rebel in 1971, using an advertising campaign that asked, "What's a Matador?" In 1972, American Motors won the tender for Los Angeles Police Department cruisers, and Matadors were used by the department from 1972 until 1975, replacing the Plymouth Satellite. American Motors supplied Mark VII Limited owner Jack Webb with two Matadors, a sedan and a wagon, for use in his popular television series Adam-12, increasing the cars' public profile. Matadors saw fleet use as taxis, government, police, and fire vehicles in some states.

In 1973, American Motors signed a licensing agreement with Curtiss-Wright to build Wankel engines for cars and Jeeps.

Starting in 1974, the Matador sedan and station wagon were mildly refreshed, with new boxier front and rear ends, making it full-sized. This second-generation model was produced virtually unchanged until 1978.

Sagging sales and tight finances resulted in the discontinuation of the Matador line after the 1978 model leaving American Motors to focus almost exclusively on its Hornet platform-based cars and the Jeep line.

=== Ambassador ===
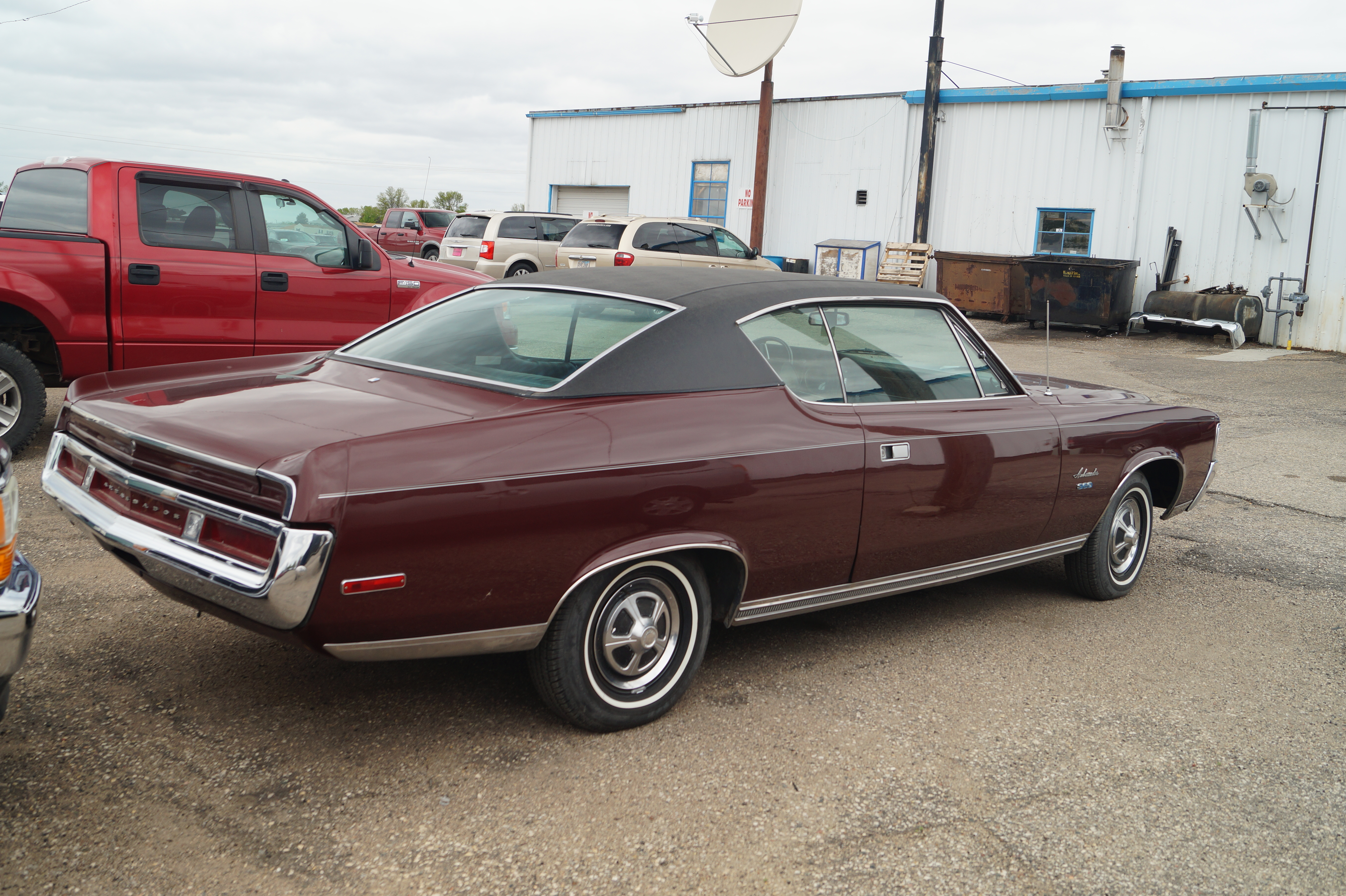
1971 Ambassador hardtop with "Brougham" trim

From 1970, the Rebel and Ambassador were identical from the A-pillar back. The Ambassador continued as AMC's upmarket model with higher trim, more equipment, and air conditioning as standard. From the A-pillar forward, the Ambassador was redesigned and stretched 7 inches (178 mm) to become the biggest ever, just as the 1973 Arab Oil Embargo sparked gasoline rationing across the nation. The additional length was due to a new front-end design and more substantial energy-absorbing bumpers required of all automobiles sold in the U.S. Sales of all large cars fell due to economic problems and rising gasoline prices. The Ambassador became a full-sized car in 1974 and was discontinued after the 1974 model year, leaving only the Matador as American Motors' full-size offering. Nash and American Motors made Ambassadors from 1927 through 1974, the longest use of the same model name for any American Motors product and, at the time, the longest continuously used nameplate in the industry.

=== Matador Coupe ===
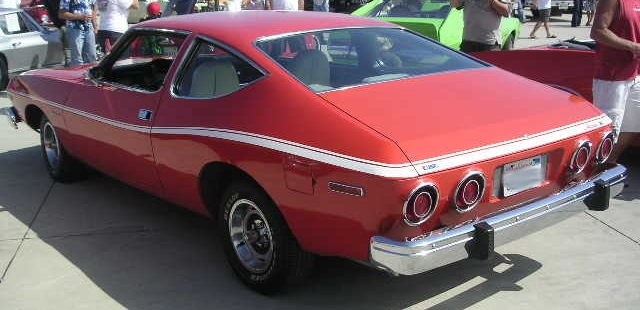
1974 Matador X Coupe

In 1974, the first-generation Matador two-door hardtop, known as the "flying brick" due to its poor aerodynamics in NASCAR competition, was replaced with a sleek, smoothly shaped, and radically styled two-door coupe. The model received praise for its design, including "Best Styled Car of 1974" by Car and Driver magazine, customer satisfaction, and sold almost 100,000 coupes over five years. The Matador Coupe shared few components with the Matador sedan and station wagon other than suspension, drive train, some trim, and interior parts.

=== Metropolitan Buses ===
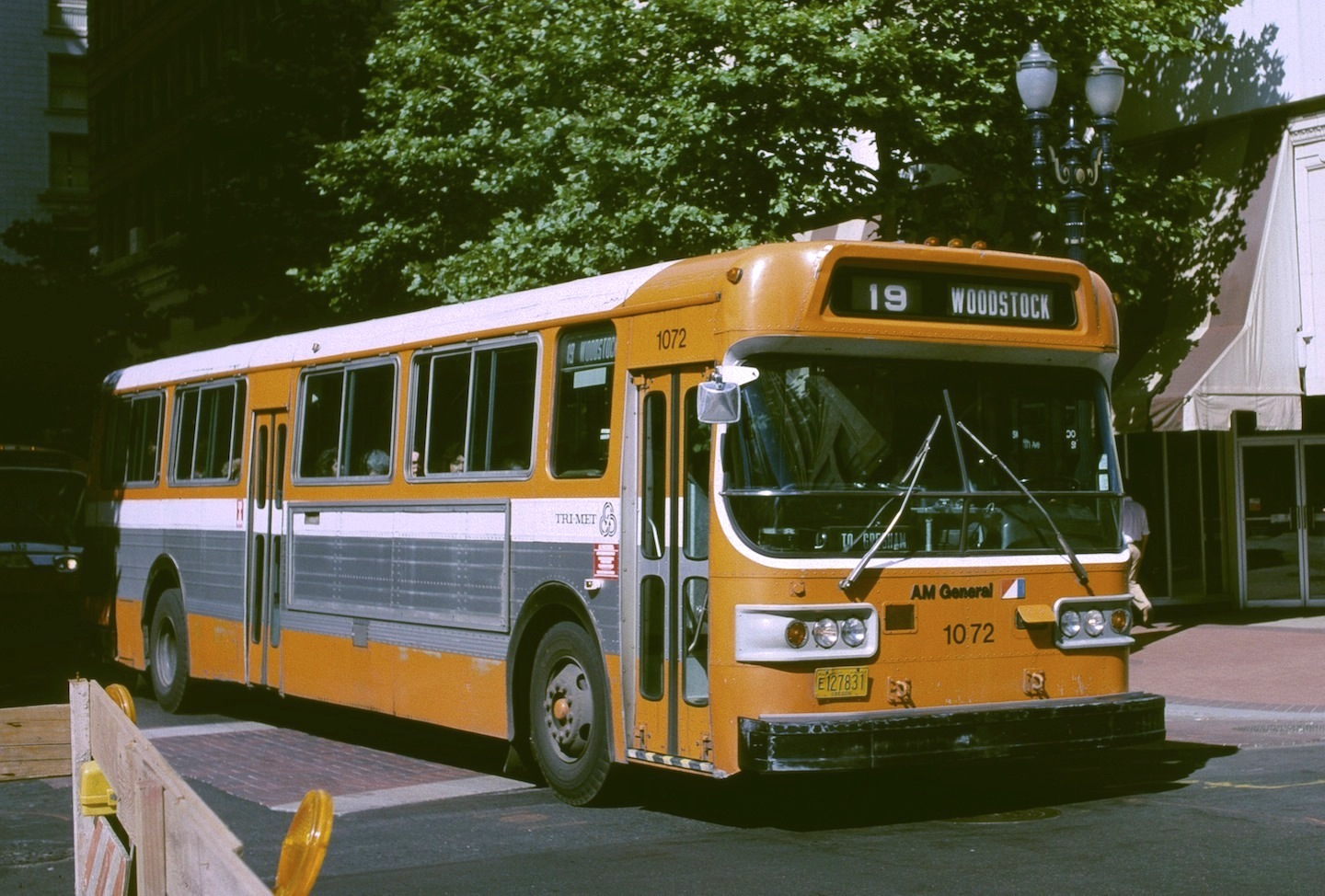
AM General transit bus

In 1974, American Motors's AM General subsidiary began building urban transit buses in cooperation with Flyer Industries of Winnipeg, Manitoba. A total of 5,431 Metropolitan buses, including 219 electric trolley buses, were built before production ceased in 1979. Production of diesel buses had ceased in 1978, with only trolley bus production taking place in 1979.

=== Pacer ===
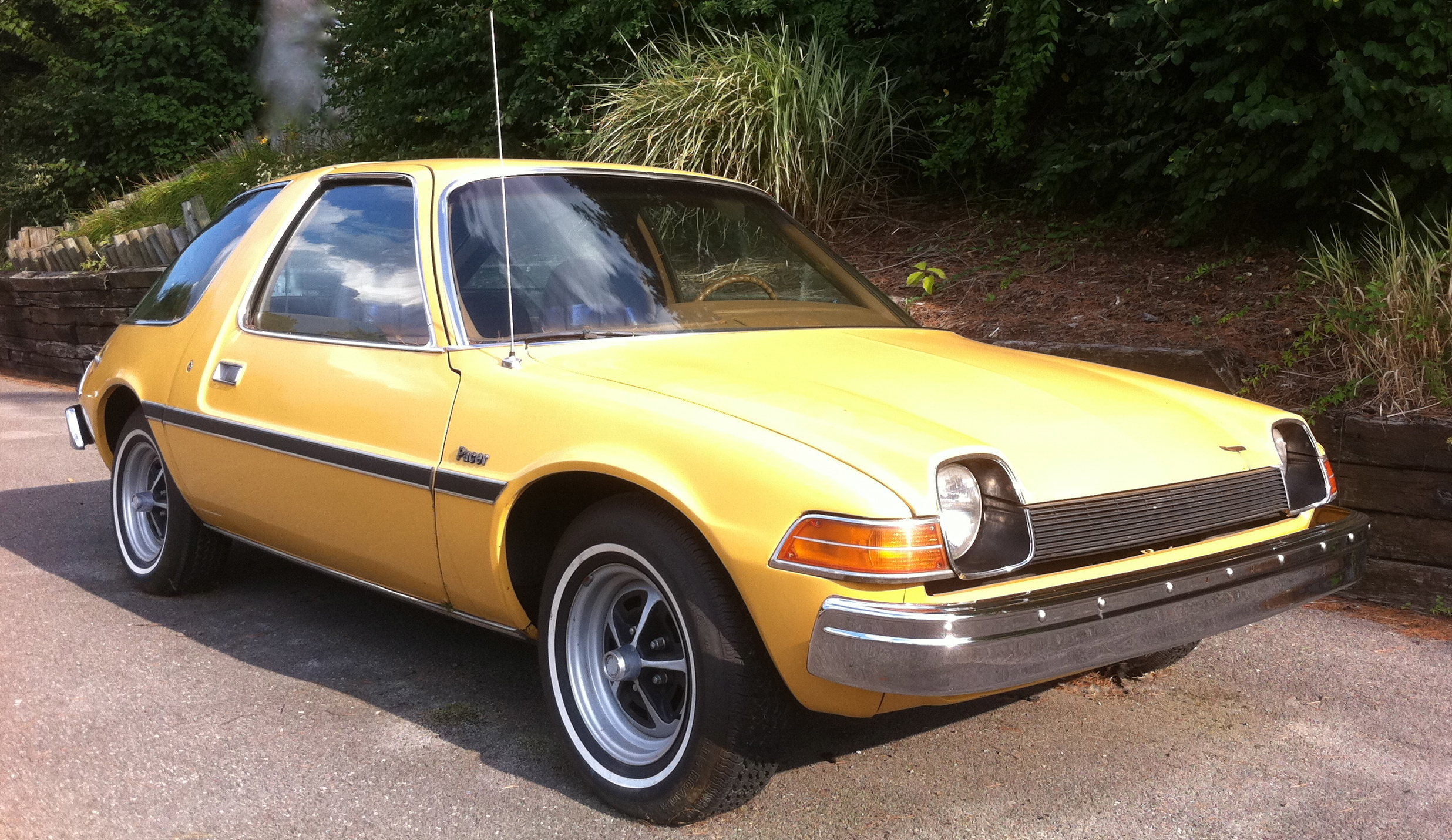
1975 AMC Pacer

The AMC Pacer, an innovative all-new model introduced in March 1975 and marketed as "the first wide small car", was a subcompact designed to provide the comfort of a full-sized car. Its pre-production development coincided with tightened U.S. federal passenger emissions and auto safety regulations. The Pacer sold well its first two years with 262,772 combined units sold in the US.

With the Arab Oil Embargo of 1973, General Motors aborted the Wankel rotary engine around which the Pacer had been designed, as its fuel consumption exceeded that of conventional engines with similar power. Therefore, American Motors's existing 258 and 232 cu in (4.2 and 3.8 L) AMC Straight-6 engines were used in the Pacer instead. The fuel economy was better than the expected rotary engine's, but the I6's gas mileage was relatively low in light of the new focus on energy efficiency. Also, as the Pacer shared few components other than the drivetrain with other American Motors cars, it was expensive to make, and the cost increased when sales fell steeply after the first two years. The Pacer line was discontinued in mid-1980.

Development and production costs for the Pacer and Matador Coupe drained capital that might otherwise have been invested in updating the more popular Hornet and Gremlin lines so that toward the end of the 1970s, the company faced the growing energy crisis with aged products that were uncompetitive in hotly contested markets. However, "AMC used cars, as far back as 1967, had the advantage of good warranty coverage ... so most owners were conscious of low-cost car maintenance ... AMC units became some of the very best buys on the used car market" by 1975.

The 1977 Gremlin had redesigned headlights, grille, rear hatch, and fascia. For economy in the fuel crisis, American Motors offered the car with a more fuel-efficient Volkswagen-designed Audi 4-cylinder engine 2.0 L (122 cu in). The engine was expensive for American Motors to build, and the Gremlin retained the less costly but less economical 232 cu in (3.8 L) as standard equipment.

The AMX nameplate was revived in 1977. It was a sporty appearance package on the Hornet hatchback featuring upgrades, as well as the 258 cu in (4.2 L) inline six as standard with a choice of three-speed automatic or four-speed manual transmissions. The 304 cu in (5.0 L) V8 engine was optional with the automatic transmission.

As all Matadors now received standard equipment that was formerly optional (e.g., power steering, automatic transmission), the "Brougham" package was dropped from 1977. Optional on the Matador coupe was a landau vinyl roof with opera windows, and top-line Barcelonas offered new two-tone paint.

=== Concord ===
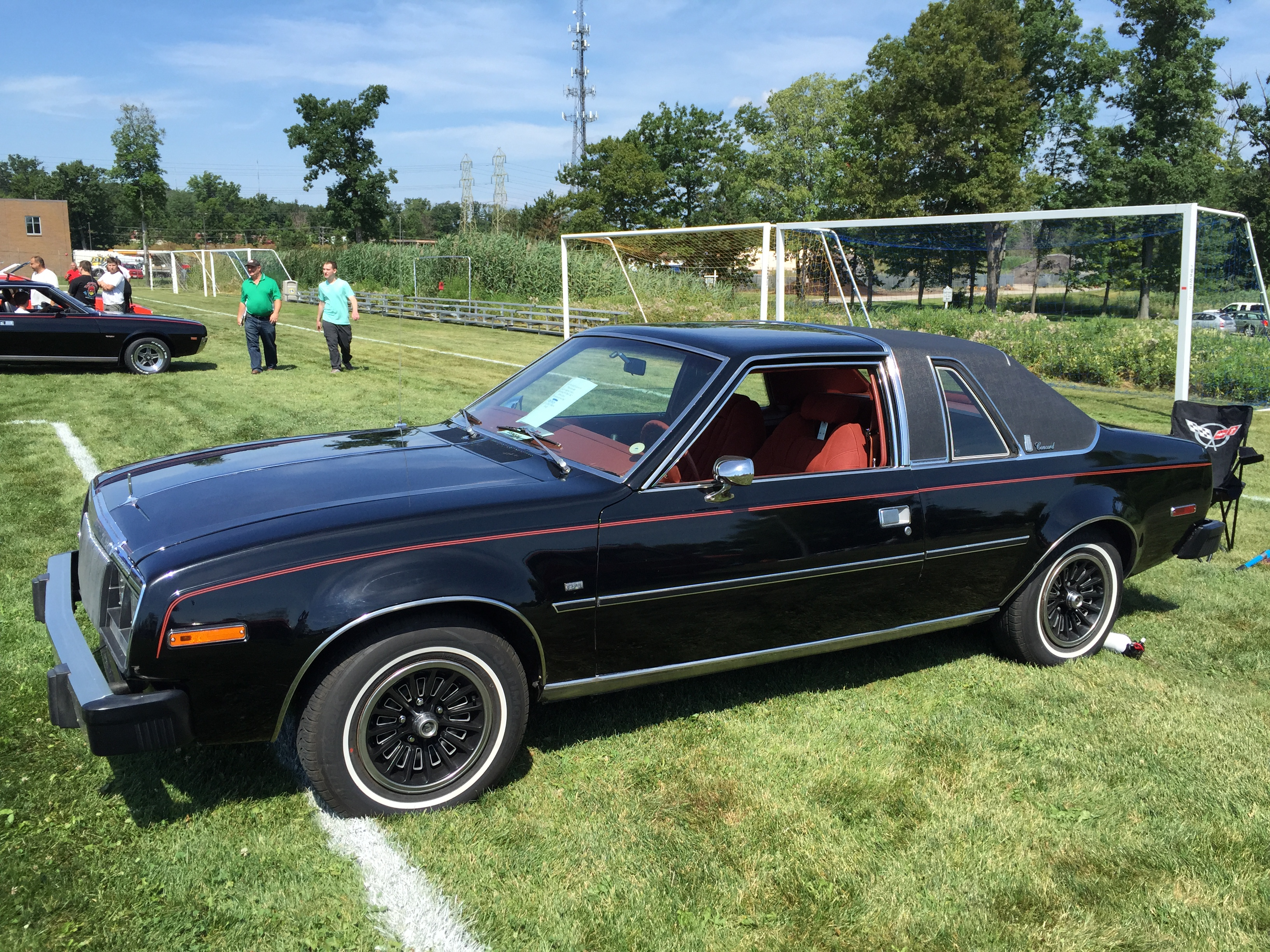
1979 Concord 2-Door Sedan

For the 1978 model year, the Hornet platform was redesigned with an adaptation of the new Gremlin front-end design and renamed AMC Concord. American Motors targeted it at the emerging "premium compact" market segment, paying particular attention to ride and handling, standard equipment, trim, and interior luxury.

Gremlins borrowed the Concord instrument panel, a Hornet AMX-inspired GT sports appearance package, and a new striping treatment for X models.

The AMC Pacer hood was modified to clear a V8 engine, and a Sports package replaced the former X package. With falling sales of Matador Coupes, sedans, and wagons, their 304 cu in (5.0 L) V8 engine was dropped, leaving only the 258 cu in (4.2 L) Inline-6 (standard on coupes and sedans) and the 360 cu in (5.9 L) V8 (optional on coupes and sedans, standard on wagons). The two-tone Barcelona luxury package was offered on Matador sedans, and two-tone red paint was introduced as an additional Barcelona option. Matador production ceased at the end of the model year with total sales of 10,576 units. The Matador was no longer attractive as automakers struggled to overcome economic woes, including continuing fuel price increases and double-digit U. S. inflation.

=== Spirit ===
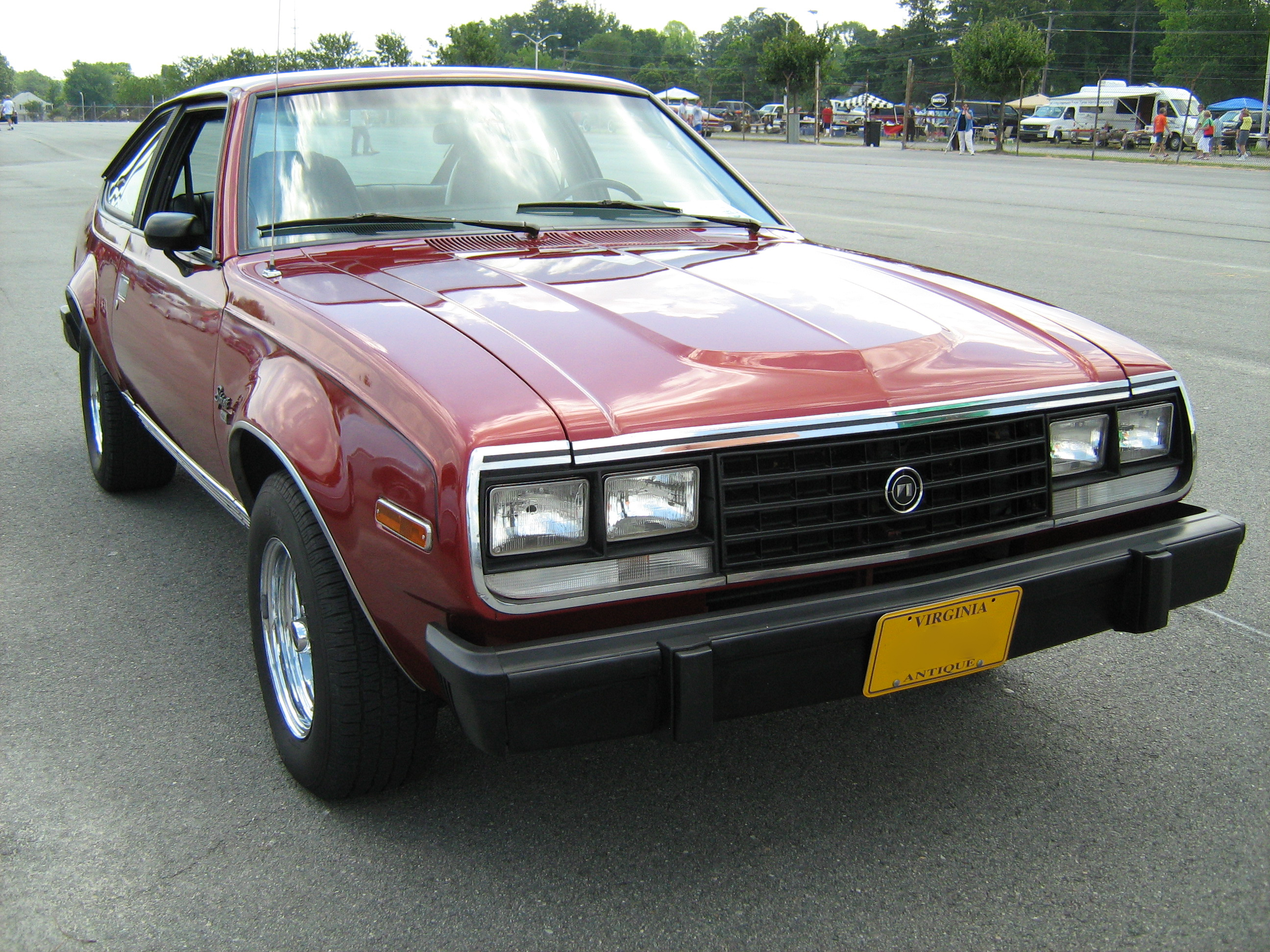
1979 Spirit GT

For the 1979 model year, the Spirit sedan replaced the Gremlin. A new fastback version of the car, the Spirit Liftback, proved successful.

In December, Pacer production ceased after a small run of 1980 models was built to use up parts stock.

Concords received a new front-end treatment, and in their final season, hatchbacks became available in DL trim. On May 1, 1979, American Motors marked the 25th anniversary of the Nash-Hudson merger with "Silver Anniversary" editions of the AMC Concord and Jeep CJ in two-tone silver (Jeeps then accounted for around 50 percent of the company's sales and most of their profits), and introduced the LeCar, a U.S. version of the small, fuel-efficient Renault 5, in dealer showrooms.

Concord and Spirit models were dropped after 1983.

== Financial developments, Renault partnership ==
=== Late 1970s ===
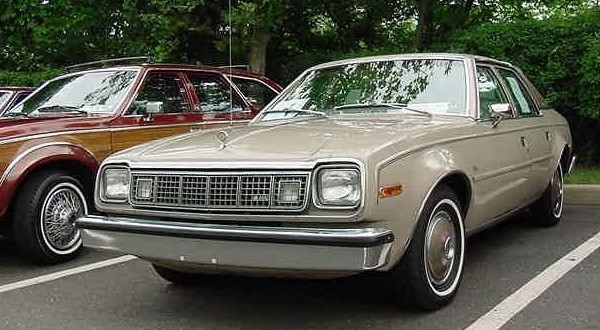
1978 AMC Concord

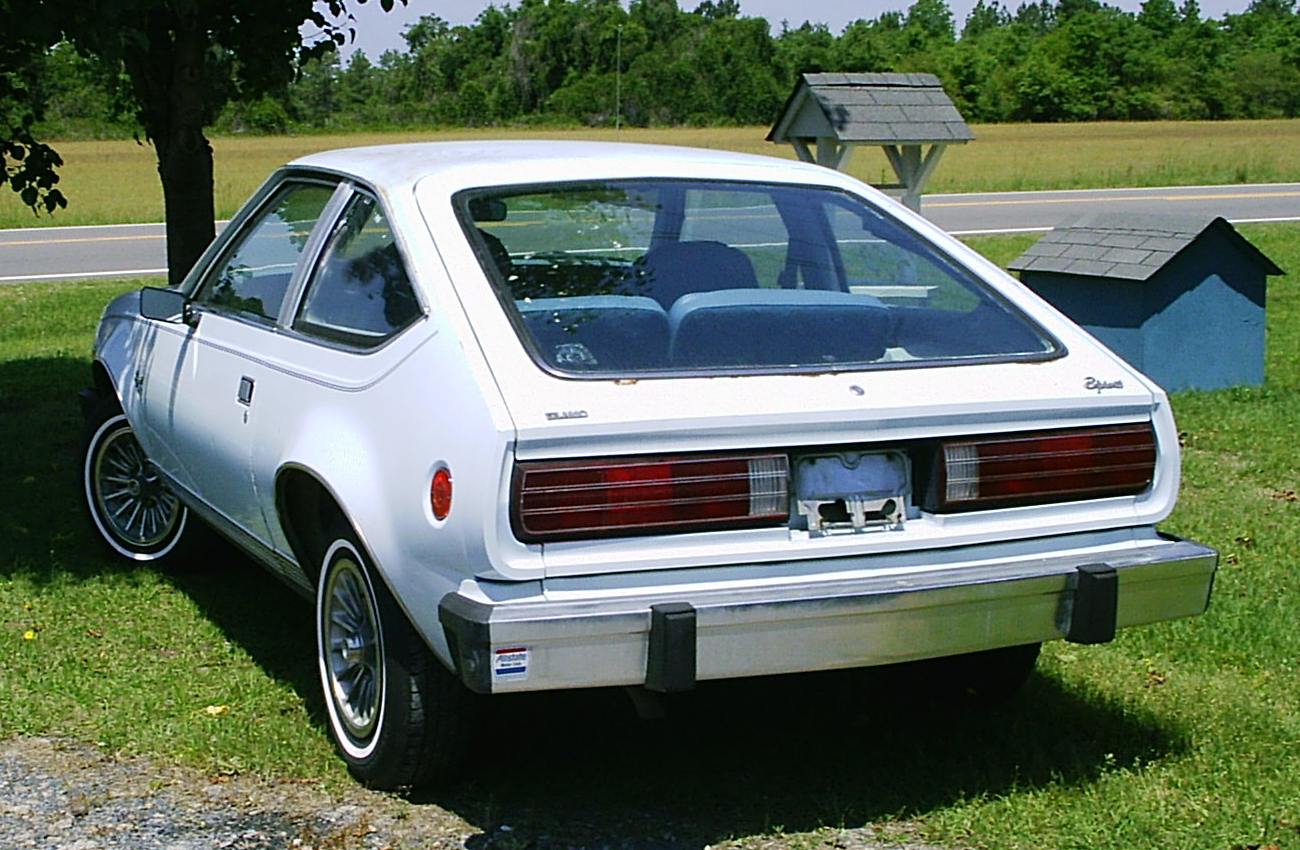
AMC Spirit liftback

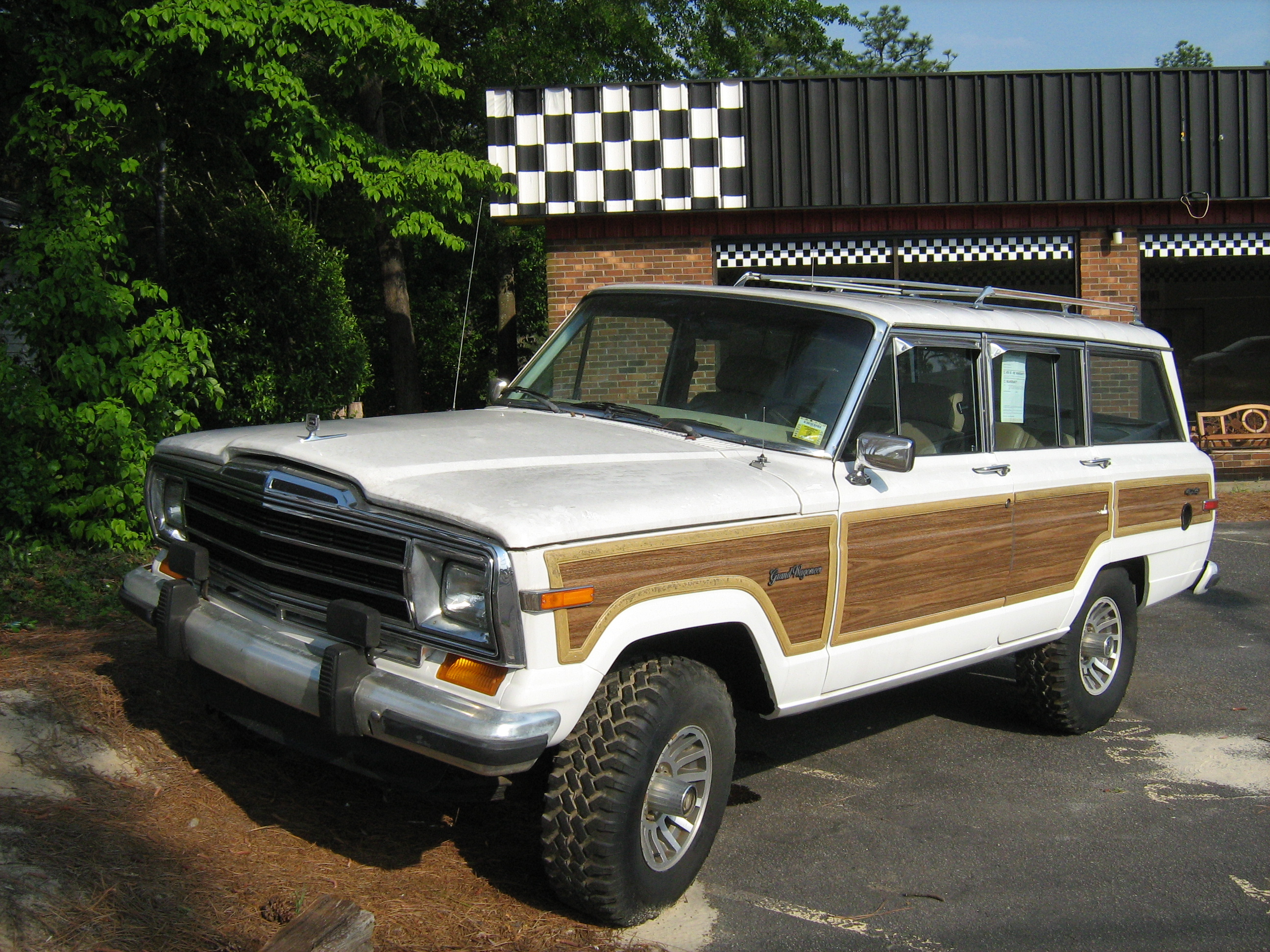
Jeep Grand Wagoneer

In February 1977, Time magazine reported that although American Motors had lost $73.8 million in the previous two fiscal years, U.S. banks had agreed to a year's extension for a $72.5 million credit that had expired in January, that stockholders had received no dividends since 1974, and that Pacer sales did not match expectations. However, Time noted record Jeep sales and a backlog of orders for AM General's buses.

In July 1977, it was announced that the General Services Administration of the Federal U.S. government had awarded AMC a three-year contract worth $15 million to lease 5,838 cars. Since the beginning of the fiscal year on October 1, 1976, the GSA had purchased 8,700 cars from AMC for $30 million.

On October 21, 1977, Roy Chapin Jr. retired, and Gerald C. Meyers became chairman and CEO.

On March 31, 1978, American Motors and Renault announced a sweeping agreement for jointly manufacturing and distributing cars and trucks that would benefit both. A month later, American Motors announced that it would halt the production of standard urban transit buses after about 4,300 were sold by its AM General subsidiary over a period of three years. In May 1978, the U.S. Environmental Protection Agency ordered the recall of all American Motors's 1976 cars (except those conforming to California emissions regulations) – some 270,000 vehicles— plus 40,000 1975 and 1976 Jeeps and mini trucks, for correction of a fault in the pollution control system. Total cost was estimated at up to $3 million, or more than AMC had earned the previous quarter.

American Motors lost an estimated $65 million on its conventional (non-Jeep) cars for the fiscal year that ended September 30, 1978, but strong Jeep sales helped the company to an overall $36.7 million profit on sales of $2.6 billion. However, American Motors faced costly engineering work to bring their Jeeps into compliance with a federal directive for all 4-wheel-drive vehicles to average 15 mpg_{‑US} (16 L/100 km; 18 mpg_{‑imp}) by 1981.

In December 1978 the government of Iran, embroiled in the Iranian revolution, cut off oil exports to the world. This caused a devastating effect on all American automobile makers and American consumers. Gasoline prices jumped 52 percent between September and December 1979. Each of the Big Three (Ford, General Motors, Chrysler) lost money throughout 1979 leading to Chrysler becoming insolvent and considering bankruptcy by September. Ford survived only because of its European operations, eventually losing $7 billion in domestic sales from 1979 to 1982.

During the crisis, and with its domestic market share at 1.83%, American Motors struck a deal with Renault, the nationally owned French automaker in October 1979. AMC would receive a $150 million cash injection, $50 million in credits, and also the rights to start building the Renault 5 in 1982 (a deal for Renault products to be sold through the American Motors-Jeep dealer network had already been made in 1979). In return, Renault acquired a 22.5% interest in American Motors. This was not the first time the two companies had worked together. Lacking a prestige model line in the early 1960s, Renault assembled CKD kits and marketed Rambler cars in France.

In 1979, American Motors announced a record $83.9 million profit on sales of $3.1 billion (US$13,751,719,395 in 2025 dollars) for the fiscal year ending in September—this despite an economic downturn, soaring energy prices, rising American unemployment, automobile plants shutting down, and an American market trend towards imported cars.

=== 1980s ===
A drop in Jeep sales caused by the declining economy and soaring energy prices began to constrict American Motors' cash flow. At the same time, pressure increased on the company's non-Jeep product lines. The face-lifts and rebranding of American Motors' once-innovative and successful cars were not enough in a competitive landscape that had changed dramatically. No longer was the threat limited to the Big Three automakers (General Motors, Ford, and Chrysler). In response to the 1979 oil crisis, the Big Three had resorted to importing foreign motor vehicles, mainly Japanese models. Japanese models were mass-marketed and had lower manufacturing costs. By the end of 1980 Japanese manufacturers surpassed Detroit's production totals, becoming first in the world. Indeed, the share of Japanese cars in U.S. auto purchases rose from 9 percent in 1976 to 21 percent in 1980. The Japanese manufacturers (Honda, Toyota, and Nissan) used streamlined production methods such as outsourcing and Just In Time (JIT) supply-chain management. They had new, highly efficient assembly plants in the United States. And now they targeted the heart of American Motors' passenger product line: small cars.

While Americans turned to the new imports in increasing numbers, American Motors continued its struggle at the inefficient and aging downtown Kenosha, Wisconsin, facilities—the oldest continuously operating automobile plant in the world, where components and unfinished bodies still had to be transported across the city.

In early 1980, the banks refused American Motors further credit. Lacking both capital and resources for the new, truly modern products it needed to offer, the company turned to Renault for a $90 million loan (US$351,676,090 in 2025 dollars). By September that year, American Motors's U.S. market share had fallen to 1.7%, and in November sales dropped 19.1%. American Motors warned stockholders that the company could be bankrupted if they did not approve a plan for Renault to acquire as much as 59% of the company. On December 16, 1980, American Motors shareholders "overwhelmingly approved making the French Government-owned Renault" their company's principal owner. Jean-Marc Lepeu, former corporate treasurer at Renault, became vice president for finance at American Motors. In September 1981, Jose Dedeurwaerder, a Renault veteran of 23 years, mainly in manufacturing, became American Motors' executive vice president for manufacturing.

In January 1982, the company's president W. Paul Tippett Jr. replaced Gerald C. Meyers as chairman and CEO, and Dedeurwaerder moved up to be president. By this time Renault owned 46% of American Motors. Dedeurwaerder brought a broad perspective at this critical time: he is credited with streamlining many of American Motors' arcane management techniques. He also instituted important improvements in plant layouts, as well as in cost and quality control.

Having increased its stake in the company several times to keep it solvent, Renault eventually owned 49% in 1983. Some view this development as ending American Motors' run as a truly American car company.

New ownership and management heralded a new product venture for American Motors: a line of modern front-wheel drive cars, designed by Renault, to be produced at Kenosha.

== 1980s product developments ==
In 1980, all American Motors cars received a new rust-proofing process using Ziebart as Factory Rust Protection. The extra protection also included aluminized trim screws, plastic inner fender liners, and galvanized steel in every exterior body panel, along with the unibody getting a deep-dip (up to the window line) bath in epoxy-based primer. American Motors backed up the rust protection program with a 5-year "No Rust Thru" component to its comprehensive "Buyer Protection Plan."

=== AMC Eagle ===
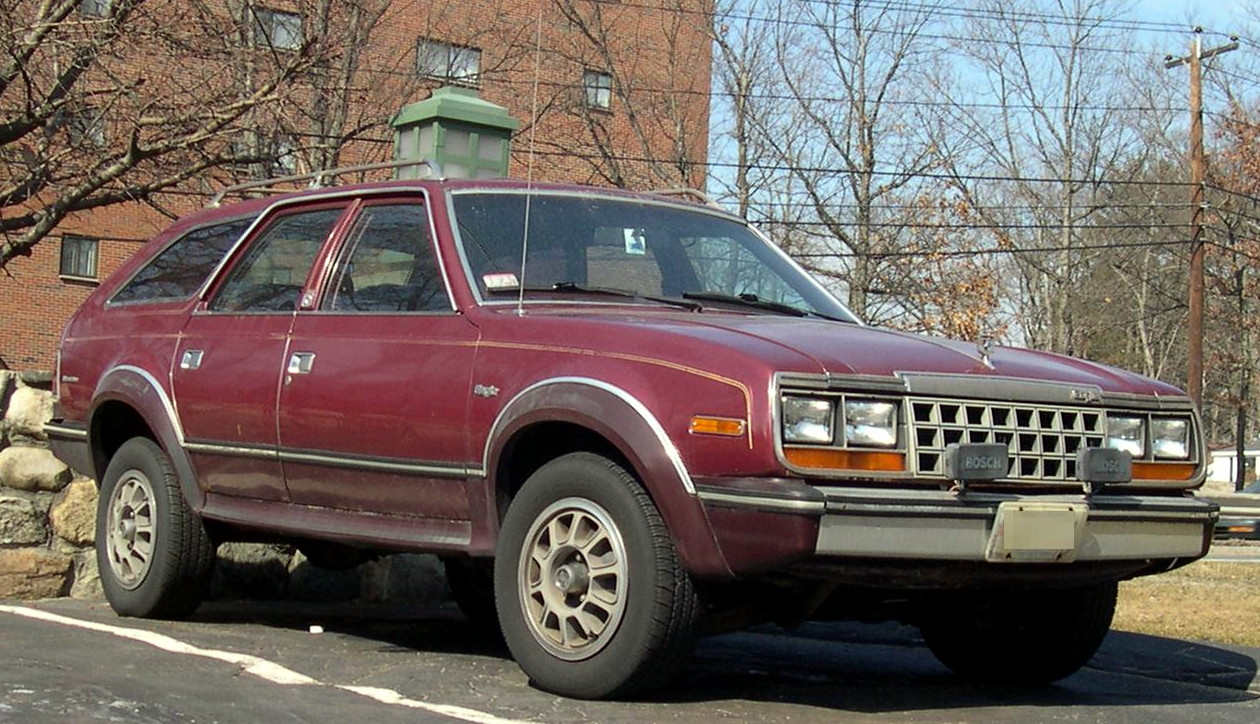
1981 AMC Eagle Wagon

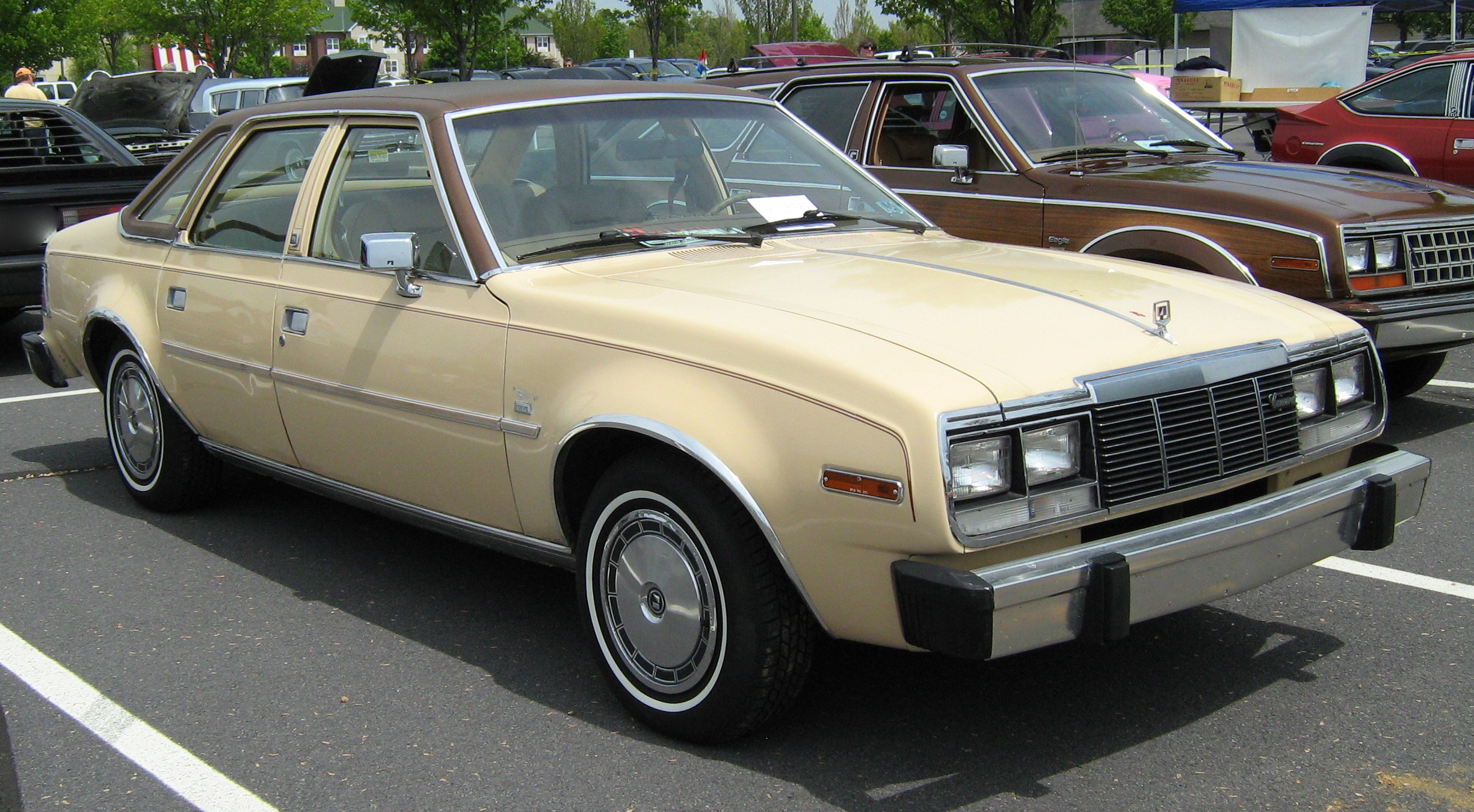
1981 AMC Concord

In August 1979, for the 1980 model year, American Motors introduced four-wheel-drive versions of the Spirit and Concord, calling the collective line the AMC Eagle. Eagles rapidly became one of the company's best-known products and are considered one of the first "crossover SUVs". Eagles used the 2-wheel drive body shells mounted on an all-new platform developed by American Motors in the late 1970s. Featuring an innovative full-time four-wheel-drive system, it sold best in snow-prone areas. Sales started strongly but declined over time. While the two-wheel drive Spirit and Concord were discontinued after 1983 as the company concentrated on its new Renault Alliance, the Eagle survived for five years longer, albeit only in station wagon form, into the 1988 model year. This meant the four-wheel-drive Eagle was the lone representative of the American Motors brand from 1984 until the 1988 model year. All the company's remaining output was branded Renault or Jeep. The last AMC Eagle was built on December 14, 1987.

=== Renault Alliance, Encore, and GTA ===
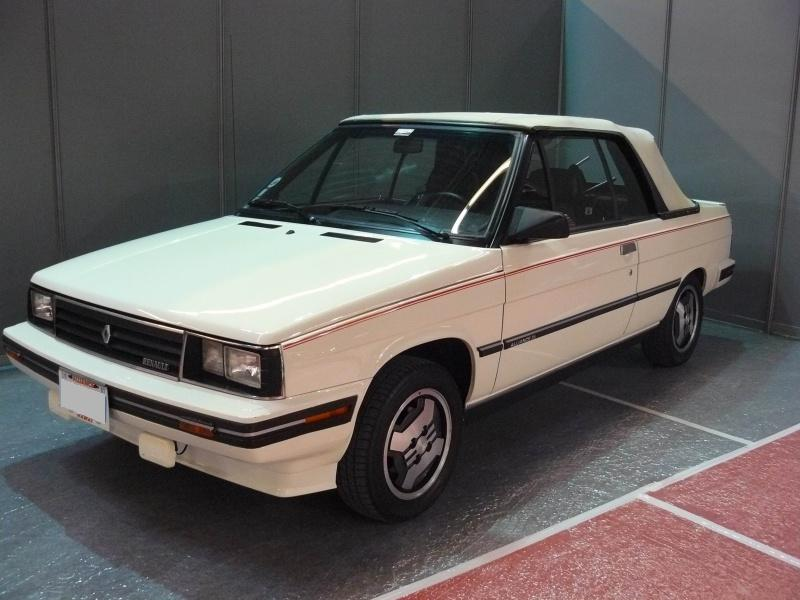
The Renault Alliance, based on the Renault 9, was built by American Motors Corporation from 1983 until 1987.

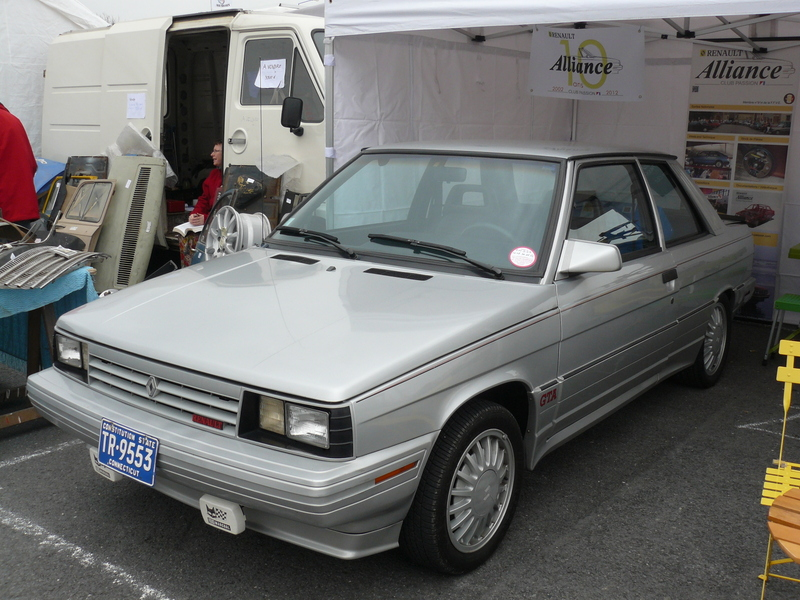
1987 GTA two-door sedan

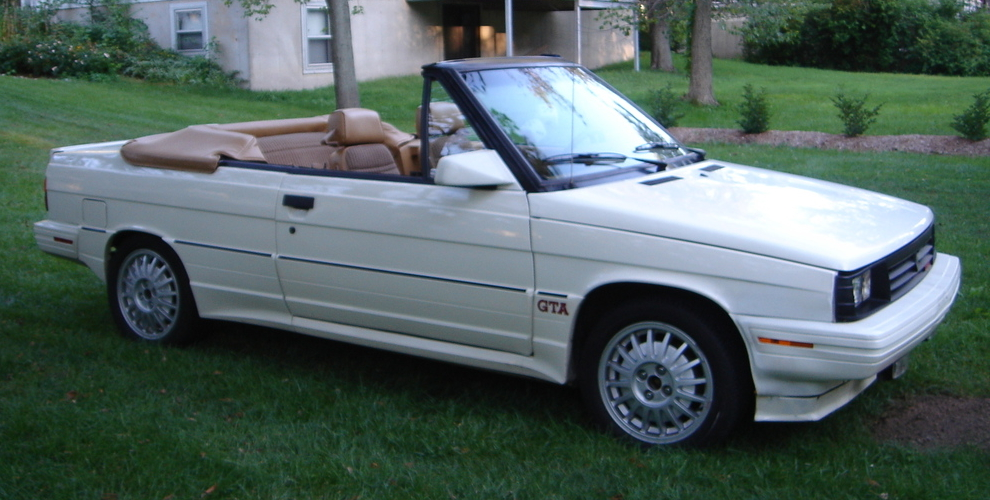
1987 GTA convertible

The Renault Alliance was the first joint product of the American Motors-Renault partnership. Introduced in 1983, the Alliance was a front-wheel-drive Renault 9 compact car slightly restyled for the American market by Dick Teague, mainly to comply with American safety standards, and produced by American Motors at Kenosha. The car was badged as a Renault, and some cars also carried American Motors badges. It was available as a sedan with two or four doors and later as a convertible. The hatchback, introduced in 1984 and badged as the Renault Encore, was the same as the European Renault 11 model.

The new model, introduced during increased interest in small cars, won several awards, including Motor Trend Car of the Year. Motor Trend declared: "The Alliance may well be the best-assembled first-year car we've ever seen. Way to go Renault!" The Alliance was listed as number one on Car and Driver's list of ten best cars for 1983. The positive reception and sales of 200,000 Alliances by 1984 was hindered by the availability of only two body styles. The Alliance was a European-designed car that was not fully suited to U.S. market demands. The distribution network was also not well supported, which led to the lower quality delivered by dealerships with "disastrous consequences" for the image of the automobiles and high warranty costs because of quality failings, which greatly impacted sales from 1985 to the end of production in 1987.

After the 1983 model year, American Motors focused entirely on four-wheel drive autos; the company stopped producing rear-wheel-drive cars. American Motors facilities were then used to assemble the Renault-branded Alliance and Encore compact and subcompact cars.

For the final 1987 model year, a higher-performance version of the Alliance 2-door sedan and the convertible was sold as the Renault GTA. This version had a Renault two-liter engine that was exclusive to it and not shared with the European Renault 9 and 11 models. It was described as "dandy little sports car" and a "pocket rocket" defined as a low-priced "car based on high production economy but with emphasis placed on appearance, performance and handling."

The Encore models were renamed Alliance Hatchback in 1987. Alliance and GTA production ended in June of that year, while the Renault 9 and 11 models continued through the 1988 model year in Europe, being replaced by the all-new Renault 19.

=== Jeeps ===
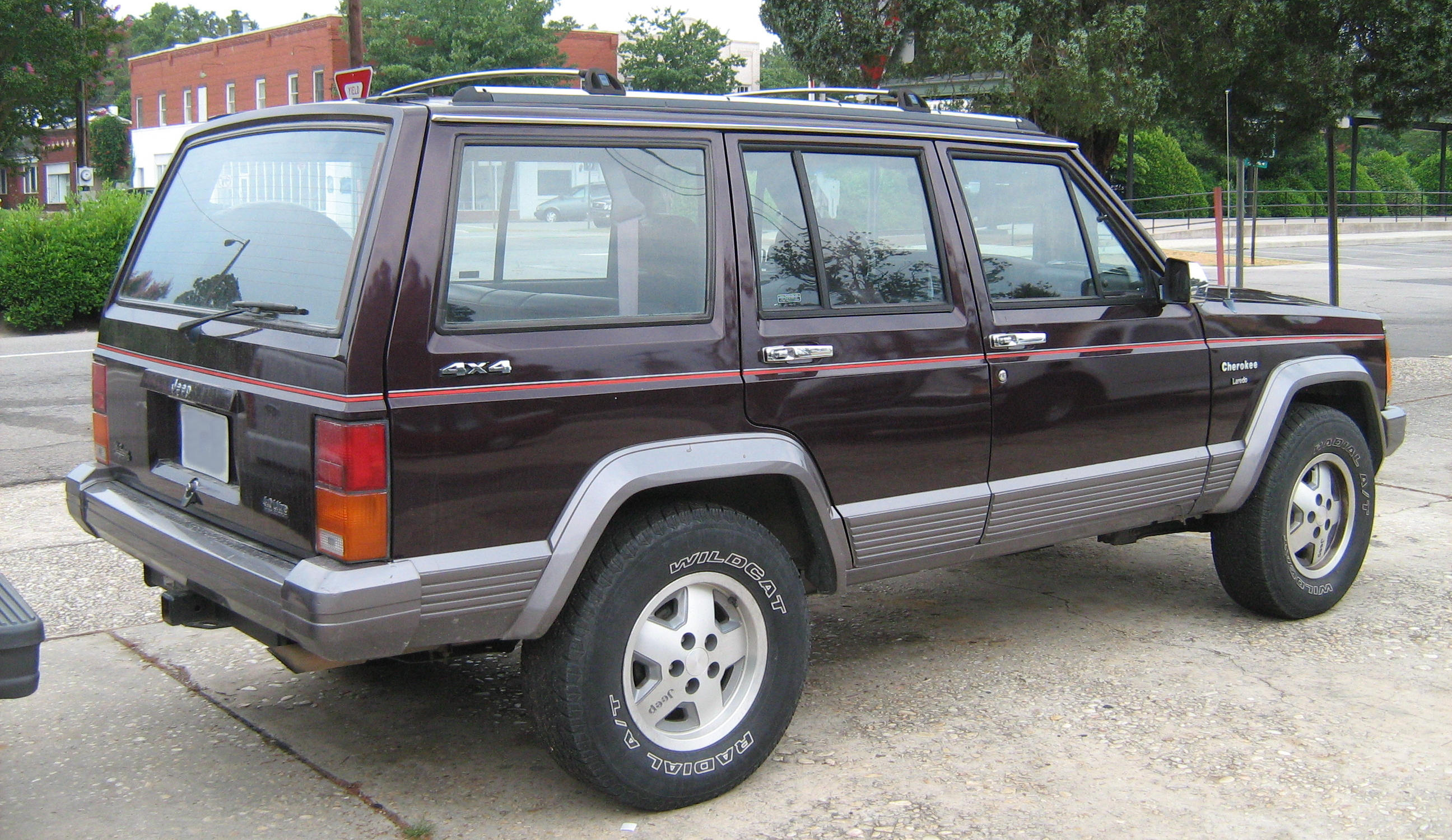
Jeep Cherokee Laredo

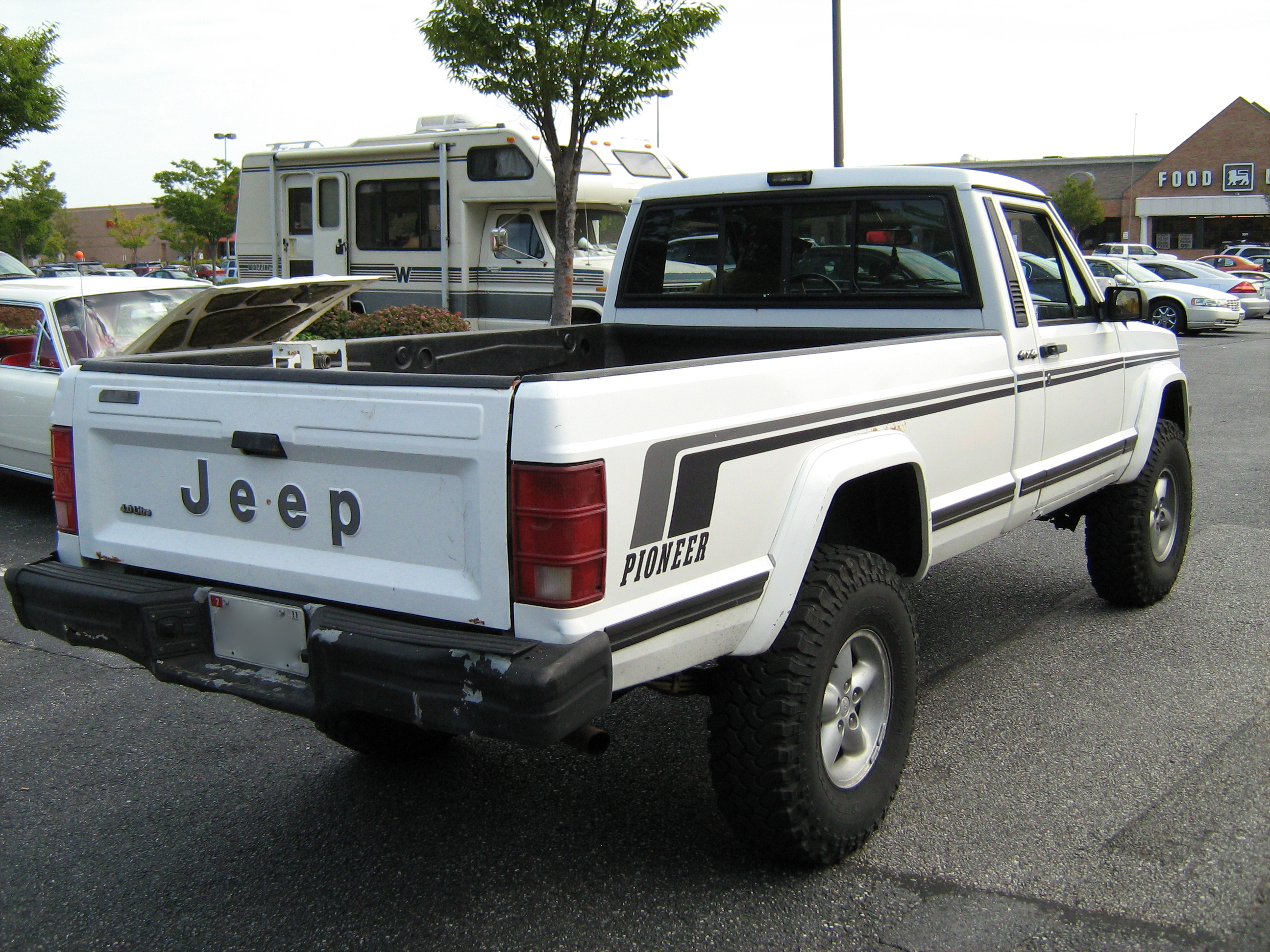
Jeep Comanche Pioneer

More beneficial to American Motors' future was the introduction of an all-new line of compact Jeep Cherokee and Wagoneer models in the autumn of 1983 for the 1984 model year. Renault's François Castaing, head of AMC's product development team, designed the new Jeep platform with styling by Dick Teague. Renault was interested in selling the Cherokee in Europe, but the vehicle needed to be lighter and more fuel-efficient to meet European expectations. The new XJ weighed 3,100 pounds (1,406 kilograms), due to its unibody construction and lighter components such as the front seats taken from the Renault 9 and 11 and new Renault Alliance.

According to David Tracy, "The new XJ Jeep ... was 1,200 pounds [540 kg] lighter, 31 inches [790 mm] shorter, six inches narrower, and four inches lower than the Cherokee SJ it replaced, and yet — thanks to unibody construction — the XJ kept 90 percent of its predecessor's interior volume." And, not only was fuel economy much improved, but "articulation is also better, as is ground clearance, as well as approach, departure, and break-over angles. These, along with its smaller profile, make the XJ better both off-road and on."

AMC's initial forecasts of 40,000 Cherokee and Wagoneer sales were shattered, with sales amounting to 75,000 in their first year. The three leading off-roading magazines, Petersen's 4-Wheel & Off-Road, Four Wheeler, and Off-Road each named the new Jeep Cherokee as the "4x4 of the year." The popularity of these downsized Jeeps pioneered a new market segment for what later became defined as the sport utility vehicle (SUV). They initially used the AMC 150.4 cu in (2.5 L) OHV four-cylinder engine with a carburetor, and a General Motors-built 2.8 L (171 cu in) carbureted V6 was optional. In 1986, throttle-body injection replaced the carburetor on the 2.5 L I4 engines. A Renault 2.1 L (128 cu in) Turbo-Diesel I4 diesel was also offered. Starting with the 1987 models, a new 4.0 L (244 cu in) I6 engine, derived from the older 258 cu in (4.23 L) I6 with a new head design and an electronic fuel injection system, replaced the outsourced V6. American Motors' "new" engine was designed with help from Renault and incorporated Renault-Bendix (Renix) parts for fuel and ignition management. The 4.0 developed an outstanding reputation for reliability and toughness. Retained by Chrysler after the buyout, the design received continuous improvements and refinements until its discontinuation at the end of the 2006 model year. The AMC 4.0 engine saw extensive application in XJ Cherokees and Wagoneers, Grand Cherokees, and Wranglers, and many of those engines saw (or are seeing) extremely long lives, quite a few exceeding 300,000 mi (480,000 km). Chrysler built the XJ Cherokee until the end of the 2001 model year in the U.S. and until 2005 in China.

Three other designs continued to be used after the Chrysler buyout: the Grand Wagoneer full-size luxury SUV, the full-sized J-series pickups (built on the same chassis as the earlier SJ model Wagoneers and Cherokees that dated from 1963 with the AMC 360 cu in (5.9 L) V8), and the Jeep Comanche (MJ) compact pickup, which debuted in 1986. Unlike most sport-utility vehicles based on adapted pickup truck designs, the Cherokee XJ SUV came first, and the Comanche was designed as a later pickup truck version.

Production of the full-sized pickups ceased after 1987. The Grand Wagoneer and 360 V8 engine were dropped after 1991 (the last American-made vehicle whose engine used a carburetor for fuel delivery), and the Comanche was discontinued after 1992.

== 1985 and the final buyout ==
=== Marketplace and management changes ===
Significant changes occurred in 1985 as the market moved away from American Motors' small models. With fuel relatively cheap again, buyers turned to larger, more powerful automobiles, and American Motors was unprepared for this development. Even the venerable Jeep CJ-5 was dropped after a 60 Minutes TV news magazine staged exposé of rollover tendencies under extreme conditions. American Motors also confronted an angry workforce. Labor was taking revenge, and reports circulated about the sabotage of vehicles on the assembly lines because of the failure to receive promised wage increases. There were rumors that the aging Kenosha plant was to be shut down. At the same time, Chrysler was having trouble meeting the demand for its M-body rear-drive models (Dodge Diplomat, Plymouth Gran Fury, and Chrysler Fifth Avenue). Because they were assembled using the old "gate and buck system" and the tooling could be easily moved, Chrysler could supply the components and control the quality while AMC assembled the car. Therefore, Lee Iacocca and Joseph E. Cappy agreed to use some of AMC's idle plant capacity in Kenosha.

In January 1985, Renault's chairman in France, Bernard Hanon, was dismissed by the government in a shake-up triggered by huge losses as a result of his goal to revolutionize Renault's product strategy in the 1970s and 1980s. He was instrumental in 1981 for the company to invest in AMC and also made Renault a full-line automaker, but this ballooned the firm's debt. Renault relinquished its number one sales position in Europe, which it held from 1980 until 1983. The company had been losing money since 1981 and had fallen to sixth place behind Ford, Fiat, Volkswagen, Peugeot, and General Motors. Strikes plagued Renault at the end of 1984, and the French government introduced price controls that severely cut the profit margins on cars sold in France, Renault's most important market. Hanon was replaced by Georges Besse, ex-president of Produits Chimiques Ugine Kuhlmann in France.

In April 1985, AMC Chairman W. Paul Tippett resigned to become president of a textile company. Jose J. Dedeurwaerder, president since 1982 and chief executive officer since September 1984, announced at the Paris Auto Show in October 1985, that AMC would begin imports of the innovative seven-seat, front-wheel-drive Espace minivan in the spring of 1986. This was part of expanding the range of Renault models that include plans for marketing the Renault Alpine GTA/A510 sports car through select AMC dealers. In December 1985, Dedeurwaerder became chairman of AMC's executive committee while continuing as the company's president and CEO. Joe Cappy was moved up from executive vice president to chief operating officer, and Tippet's position was filled by an ex-Renault vice president, Pierre Semerena.

Semerena made his managerial reputation as a no-nonsense cost cutter. The new management responded with tactical moves by selling the lawn care Wheel Horse Products Division and signing an agreement to build Jeeps in the People's Republic of China. The Pentagon had problems with AM General, a significant defense contractor, being managed by a partially French-government-owned firm. The U.S. government would not allow a foreign government to own a substantial portion of an important defense supplier. As a result, the profitable AM General Division was sold to LTV Corporation.

Another milestone within AMC's management was the departure of Dick Teague. He was American Motors' design vice president for 23 years - an industry record. he was responsible for many Jeep and AMC designs, including the Javelin, AMX, Hornet, Gremlin, Pacer, Matador coupe, and the Cherokee XJ.

=== Problems at Renault and assassination ===
In France, Renault continued to experience financial trouble. The investment in American Motors (including the construction of a new Canadian assembly plant in Brampton, Ontario) forced cuts at home, resulting in the closure of several French plants and mass layoffs. Renault was down to just three alternatives regarding its American holdings: (1) it could declare American Motors officially bankrupt, thereby losing its investment; (2) it could come up with more money, but Renault management perceived American Motors as a bottomless pit; or (3) American Motors could be put up for sale, and the French company could get back part of its investment. At the same time, Renault's new chairman, Georges Besse, continued to champion the French firm's future in the North American market, pointing to the company's completion of the newest and most advanced automotive assembly plant in North America, then known as Bramalea Assembly, as well as the recent introduction of the thoroughly modern, fuel-injected 4.0 L and 2.5 L engines. In addition, Jeep vehicles were riding an unprecedented surge in demand. It seemed to Besse and others that American Motors was on course for profitability.

However, on November 17, 1986, Besse, who had a high-profile among French capitalists, was assassinated by a member of a French clandestine far-left extremist group, Action Directe. AMC's plans to reinvigorate sales with higher-priced Renaults continued for a little longer, with the plan being a three-pronged lineup beginning with the mid-sized Medallion, the larger Premier above it, and the sporty Renault Alpine providing a halo car. The Medallion and the Premier both went on sale, but Alpine never made its planned mid-1987 rollout.

=== Chrysler purchases American Motors stock ===
Under pressure from Renault executives following Besse's death, Renault's new president, Raymond Levy, set out to repair employee relations and divest the company of its investment in American Motors. Renault owned 46.1% of American Motors' outstanding shares of stock. In 1986, American Motors posted a $91.3 million loss.

The earlier agreement between Chrysler and American Motors in 1985, under which American Motors would produce M-body chassis rear-drive large cars for five years from mid-1986 through 1990, fed the rumor that Chrysler was about to buy AMC. According to the head of manufacturing for Chrysler, Stephan Sharf, the existing relationship with AMC producing a car for a competitor facilitated the negotiations.

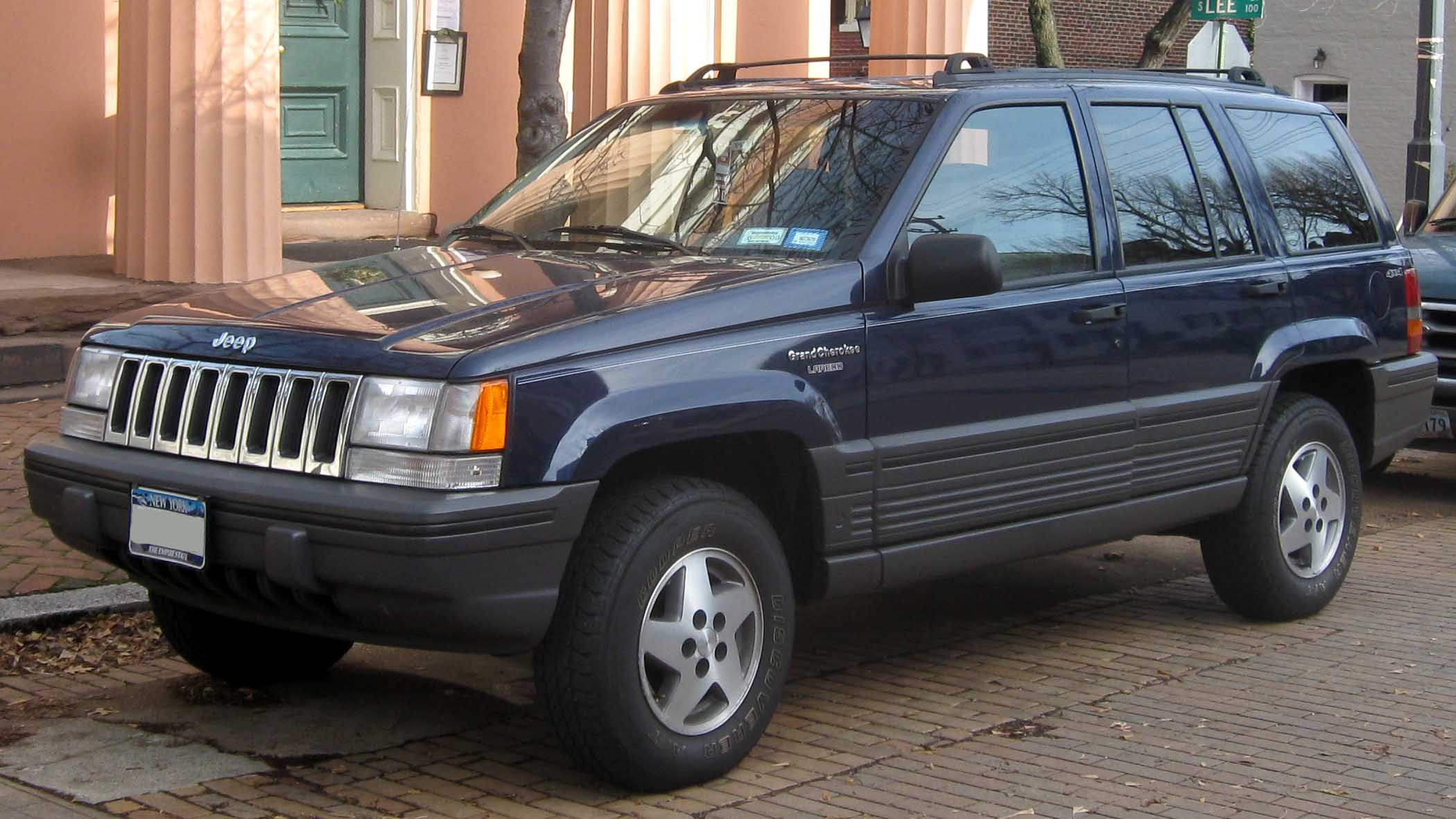
The Jeep Grand Cherokee was the driving force behind Chrysler's buyout of American Motors; Lee Iacocca wanted the design. Chrysler completed development and released it to the public in late 1992 and continues to use the nameplate.

On March 9, 1987, Chrysler agreed to buy Renault's share in American Motors, plus all the remaining shares, for about $1.5 billion ($4,250,878,735 in 2025 dollars). Chrysler made no secret that they were only interested in AMC for Jeep, AMC's new assembly plant in Canada, and AMC's network of 1,300 dealerships nationwide. Chrysler president Lee Iacocca was quoted in the March 10, 1987 LA Times as saying:

For Chrysler, the attractions are Jeep, the best-known automotive brand name in the world; a new . . . assembly plant at Bramalea, Canada, and a third distribution system giving us access to a larger market.

With the sale complete, American Motors became the Jeep-Eagle division of Chrysler on August 25, 1988, and was fully merged as of March 29, 1990.

The sale came at a time when the automotive press was enthusiastic about the proposed 1988 lineup of Renault, Eagle, and Jeep vehicles and reported that the small automaker's financial outlook was improving. American Motors' quarterly results for all of 1987 were positive. Chrysler purchased American Motors when the company appeared to be in an excellent financial position with its new product line.

It was the Jeep brand that Chrysler CEO Lee Iacocca wanted – in particular, the ZJ Gen. of the Grand Cherokee, then under development by Jeep engineers, which ultimately proved highly profitable for Chrysler (the nameplate remains in production today). However, the buyout included other attractive deal sweeteners for Chrysler. Among them was the world-class, brand-new manufacturing plant in Bramalea, Ontario, which offered Iacocca an unprecedented opportunity to increase his company's production capacity at a fire-sale price. American Motors had designed and built the plant in anticipation of building the Renault 25-based Eagle Premier. Additional profitable acquisitions were the American Motors dealer network (the addition of which strengthened Chrysler's retail distribution – many American Motors dealers switched to selling Chrysler products), and American Motors' underrated organization and management talent – which Chrysler quickly assimilated (numerous leading Chrysler engineers and executives were ex-American Motors).

Renault left the U.S. market entirely as a brand in 1987. Thus, the Renault Medallion was sold through the new Jeep-Eagle division as an Eagle, not a Renault. The Jeep-Eagle division was formed from the American Motors Jeep Renault dealer network. The Jeep and Eagle vehicles were marketed primarily by former American Motors dealers. The American Motors badge was last used on the Eagle Sports Wagon through the 1988 model year, then eliminated, and the Eagle car brand was phased out by 1998.

== Leadership ==
=== 1954: George W. Mason ===
The 1954 merger of Nash-Kelvinator Corporation and Hudson Motor Car Company that established American Motors was led by Nash-Kelvinator president George W. Mason to reap benefits from the strengths of the two firms to battle the much larger "Big Three" automakers (General Motors, Ford, and Chrysler). The merger was initially intended to be three-way, with Packard being the number three. Mason had first discussed the possibility of a merger with Packard president James J. Nance in the late 1940s. Nance insisted that if Packard were to join, he would have to be the CEO of the new company. Mason fully intended to lead the new company, thus the deal did not go through. Packard acquired Studebaker two months after Nash acquired Hudson.

Mason became CEO and president of the new company, and Hudson's president A.E. Barit retired to become an American Motors board member. Mason selected long-time Nash associate and future governor of Michigan, George W. Romney, as vice president. Roy Abernethy, ex-vice president of sales for Willys, was hired to be vice president of sales.

=== 1954–1962: George W. Romney ===
Following Mason's sudden death on October 8, 1954, Romney took over, reorganizing the company and focusing American Motors' future on a new small car line. Mason's death also allowed Romney to put an end to any further discussions for a merger between American Motors and Studebaker-Packard.

By the end of 1957, the legacy Nash and Hudson brands were completely phased out and replaced with the Rambler and Metropolitan brands. The company struggled initially, but Rambler's sales took off under Romney. A Rambler won the 1959 Mobil Economy Run, and by 1960, was the third-most-popular brand of automobile in the United States, behind Ford and Chevrolet.

=== 1962–1967: Roy Abernethy ===
George Romney left American Motors in 1962 to run for governor in Michigan and was replaced as CEO by Roy Abernethy. Abernethy had been with AMC since the 1954 merger and as vice president of sales was responsible for successfully building AMC's sales and distribution network during the 1950s and early 1960s.

After two model years (1963 and 1964) of only producing compact cars, Abernethy shifted the focus of American Motors back to bigger and more profitable cars such as the Ambassador line and tried to move away from the perceived negative of the Rambler's economy car image. Ambassador sales jumped from 18,647 in 1964 to over 64,000 in 1965. In 1966, they went to more than 71,000. However, the enormous costs of developing the new cars and engines meant American Motors now had problems in securing working capital to keep the company going. American Motors sales dropped 20% in the first half of 1966, and the firm reported a fiscal six-month loss of $4.2 million on sales of $479 million. Consequently, Robert B. Evans invested more than $2 million because American Motors's stock was selling for only 60% of the company's net worth; thus, he became its largest stockholder and was named its chairman on June 6, 1966, replacing Richard E. Cross, who continued as a director and chairman of the executive committee. In the quarter ending September 30, 1966, American Motors recorded a loss of $12,648,000 before tax credits and deferred tax assets. In the face of deteriorating financial and market positions, Abernethy "retired" as CEO in 1967, and Evans "resigned" as chairman.

=== 1967–1977: Roy D. Chapin Jr. ===
Abernethy was replaced by Roy D. Chapin Jr., the son of Hudson co-founder Roy D. Chapin. William V. Luneburg replaced Evans as president. American Motors' public explanation for the removals was that the two had "stepped aside according to a plan to give a younger team an opportunity to move the company forward".

Chapin took charge of revitalizing the company, and designer Dick Teague economized by developing several vehicles from common stampings. The AMC Matador was in reality a facelift of the AMC Rebel, itself derived from the 1967 AMC Ambassador platform. While prices and costs were cut, Teague designed new and more sporty automobiles resulting in the Javelin and AMX muscle cars; and the AMC Hornet. From 1970 Jeep production complemented AMC's existing passenger-car business. Under Chapin's leadership, AMC produced all-new compact car designs based on the Hornet platform including the Gremlin and Concord.

=== 1977–1982: Gerald C. Meyers ===
On May 24, 1977, Gerald C. Meyers replaced the retiring William Luneburg as president and Chief Operating Officer. Only 5 months later, upon the retirement of Chapin, Meyers became chairman and CEO on October 21, 1977. At the time, Meyers was 49 years old, and became the youngest top executive in the automobile industry. Meyers abandoned AMC's policy of head-on competition and instead focused on revamping its four-wheel drive vehicles, a market segment left untended by the large automakers, and by acquiring advanced technology.

Meyer's began talks with Renault in 1979 and from 1980, American Motors partnered with the French automaker to help finance their manufacturing operations, obtain much-needed capital, and source subcompact vehicles.

On December 16, 1980, Renault became the principal owner of American Motors.

At age 53, Meyers retired from the company in February 1982. By that time, Renault controlled 46% of American Motors.

=== 1982–1984: W. Paul Tippett Jr. ===
Meyers was succeeded as chairman by former American Motors president W. Paul Tippett Jr. At the time, Tippett was a member of American Motors management for only three years but had overseen almost all vehicle-making operations during his time as president. Jose Dedeurwaerder, a Renault manager, replaced Tippet as president.

Tippet's tenure as CEO was short-lived and in September 1984, he was replaced by Dedeurwaerder.

=== 1984–1986: Jose J. Dedeurwaerder ===
On September 28, 1984, Dedeurwaerder was promoted to CEO, with Tippett remaining on as chairman. On February 25, 1985, AMC announced its first full-year profit since 1979. The success was short-lived as on July 31, 1985, AMC announced that it had received a $50 million loan from Renault following a second-quarter loss of $70.4 million.

Under Dedeurwaerder, Chrysler entered an agreement with American Motors in 1985 to produce Dodge Diplomats and Plymouth Furys, as well as Dodge Omnis and Plymouth Horizons in American Motors' Kenosha, Wisconsin, plant. At the time, American Motors had excess manufacturing capacity.

In January 1986, Dedeurwaerder was named Renault's executive vice president of worldwide sales and marketing. He remained president and CEO, and chairman of the executive committee at AMC until March 23, 1986, when he was succeeded in the former two roles by Joseph E. Cappy.

By 1986, Renault had lost $700 million on $22 billion of sales in the U.S. market, and was $9 billion in debt.

=== 1986–1987: Joseph E. Cappy ===
On March 23, 1986, former executive vice president of operations Joseph E. Cappy was named president and chief executive officer of American Motors.

In 1987, after further new-vehicle development that included the Medallion (a rebadged Renault 21) and Giorgetto Giugiaro's Italian-designed new full-sized front-wheel drive sedan that became the Eagle Premier, Renault sold its 47% ownership stake in American Motors to Chrysler, which made a public offer to purchase all the remaining outstanding shares of American Motors stock. Chrysler acquired American Motors in August 1987. The primary task of Chrysler management was to integrate the two companies as quickly as possible. American Motors' final CEO, was tasked with achieving this by Chrysler president Gerald Greenwald.

After the buyout Cappy joined Chrysler as group vice president of the new Jeep-Eagle division. In 1989, he was named Chrysler's vice president of brand development. The following year he became Chrysler's vice president of international operations.

== Business legacy ==
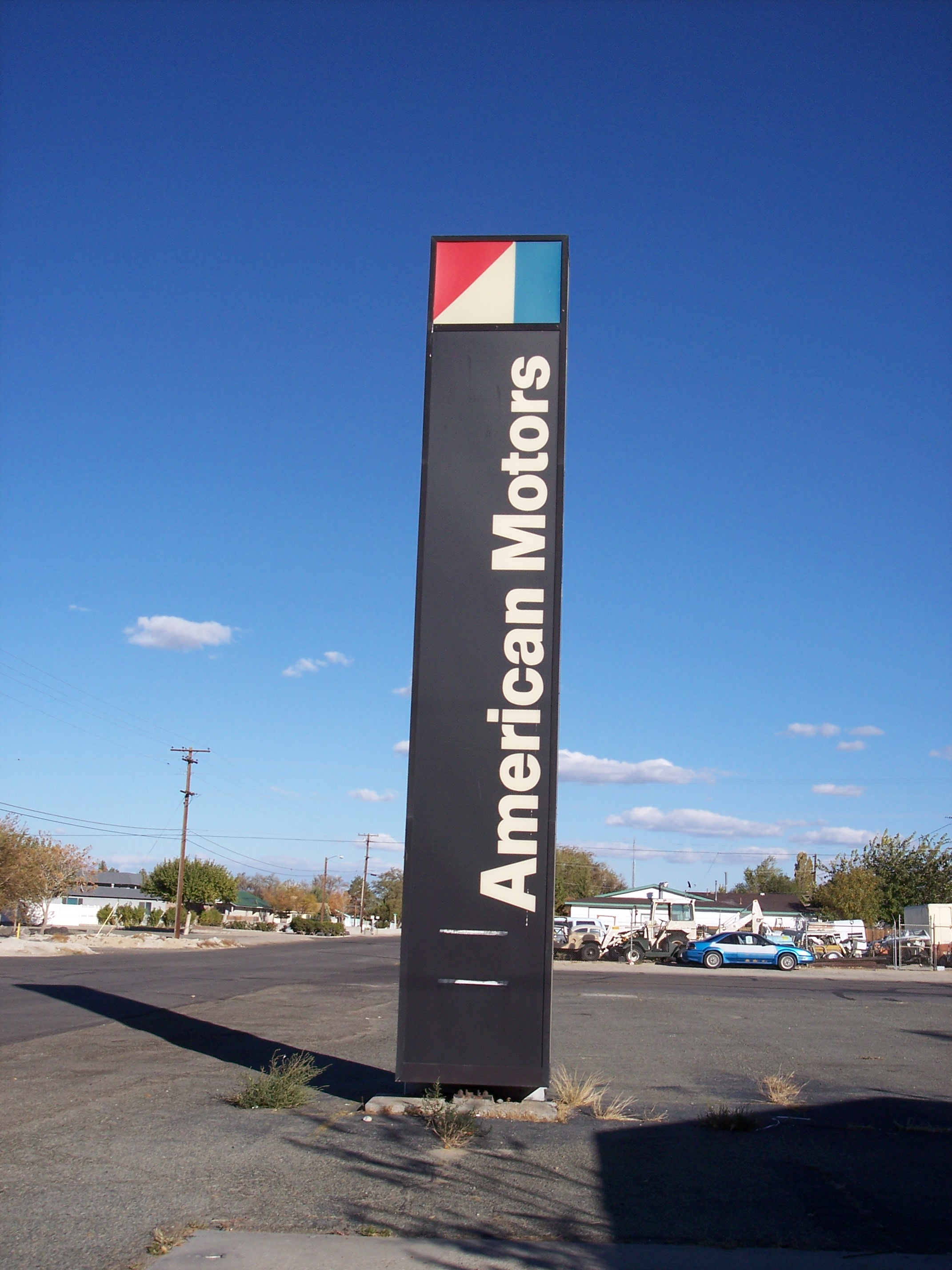
An American Motors surviving dealership sign, photographed in Hawthorne, Nevada in 2007

American Motors was forced to constantly innovate for 33 years until Chrysler absorbed it in 1987. The lessons learned from this experience were integrated into the company that bought American Motors. The organization, strategies, and several key executives allowed Chrysler to gain an edge over the competition. Even today, the lessons gained from the American Motors experience continue to benefit other firms in the industry. There are many legacies of American Motors's business strategies.

American Motors could formulate strategies that industry critics often evaluated as "strokes of brilliance". According to Roy D. Chapin Jr., American Motors realized they were up against the giants of the industry, so to compete successfully they had to be able to move quickly and with ingenuity. An essential strategy practiced by American Motors was to rely on outside vendors to supply components in which they had differential advantages. This approach was finally accepted within the U.S. auto industry, but only after each of the Big Three experienced the failure of attempting to be self-sufficient.

The smallest U.S. automaker did not have "the massive R&D budgets of General Motors, Ford, and foreign competitors ... thus American Motors placed R&D emphasis on bolstering the product life cycle of its prime products (particularly Jeeps)." In 1985, American Motors originated product lifecycle management (PLM) as a strategic business approach according to Sidney Hill Jr., executive editor for Manufacturing Business Technology, in an effort to better compete against its much larger rivals by ramping up its product development process.

Another example of American Motors' agility was the ability of management to squeeze money out of reluctant bankers, even in the face of bankruptcy. These core abilities helped save the company from collapse and, after each obstacle, gave it the wherewithal to keep it operating. Ironically, American Motors was never stronger than just before its demise.

American Motors' managers anticipated important trends in the automotive industry. It preached fuel efficiency in the 1950s, long before most auto buyers demanded it. Led by American Motors' Rambler and several European cars, the small car innovation reduced the Big Three's market share from 93% in 1957 to 82% in 1959. The company inherited foreign manufacturing and sales partnerships from Nash and continued developing business relations, decades before most of the international consolidations among automobile makers took place. American Motors was the first U.S. automaker to establish an ownership agreement with a foreign automaker, Renault.

Although small in size, American Motors was able to introduce numerous industry innovations. Starting in 1957, American Motors was the only U.S. manufacturer to fully immerse all automobile bodies in primer paint for protection against rust, until competitors adopted the practice in 1964. Even one of American Motors's most expensive new product investments (the Pacer) established many features that were later adopted by the auto industry worldwide. These included aerodynamic body design, space-efficient interiors, aircraft-style doors, and a large greenhouse for visibility. American Motors was also effective in other areas, such as marketing, by introducing low-rate financing. American Motors' four-wheel-drive vehicles established the foundation for the modern SUV market segments, and "classic" Jeep models remain the benchmark in this field. Roy D. Chapin drew on his experiences as a hunter and fisherman and marketed the Jeep brand successfully to people with like interests. The brand developed a cult appeal that continues.

The purchase of American Motors was instrumental in reviving Chrysler. According to Robert Lutz, former president of Chrysler, the American Motors acquisition was a big and risky undertaking. The purchase was part of Chrysler's strategic "retreat-cum-diversification" plan that he states did not have the proper focus. Initially, the goal was to obtain the world-renowned Jeep brand. However, Lutz discovered that the decision to buy American Motors turned out to be a gold mine for Chrysler. At that time, Chrysler's management was attempting to find a model to improve structure and operations, "something that would help get our minds unstuck and thinking beyond the old paradigms that we were so familiar with". In this transformation, "Chrysler's acquisition of AMC was one of the all-time great moments in corporate serendipity" according to Lutz " that most definitely played a key role in demonstrating how to accomplish change".

According to Lutz (1993), while American Motors had its share of problems, it was far from being a bunch of "brain-dead losers". He describes the "troops" at American Motors as more like the Wake Island Marines in battle, "with almost no resources, and fighting a vastly superior enemy, they were able to roll out an impressive succession of new products". After first reacting with anger to the purchase, Chrysler managers soon anticipated the benefits. To further solidify the organizational competencies held by American Motors, Lee Iacocca agreed to retain former American Motors units, such as engineering, completely intact. In addition, American Motors' lead engineer, François Castaing, was made head of all engineering at Chrysler. In an unthinkable strategic move, Castaing completely dismantled the entrenched Chrysler groups. In their place, American Motors's "platform team" was implemented. These were close-knit cross-functional groups responsible for the whole vehicle, contrasted with Chrysler's highly functional structure. In this capacity, Castaing's strategy was to eliminate the corporate administrative overhead bureaucracy. This move shifted corporate culture and agitated veteran executives who believed that Chrysler's reputation as "the engineering company" was being destroyed. Yet, according to the popular press, by the 1980s, Chrysler's reputation was shot, and in Lutz's view, only dramatic action would change that. In summary, Chrysler's purchase of American Motors laid the critical foundation to help re-establish a strategy for its revival in the 1990s.

Top managers at Chrysler after the AMC buyout appeared to have made errors similar to those by American Motors. For example, Chrysler invested heavily in new untested models while not keeping up its profitable high-volume lines.

The American Motors influence also continued at General Motors. GM recruited a new executive team to turn itself from near bankruptcy in the early 2000s. Among the new strategists at GM was Lutz, who understood the importance of passion in product design. Lutz's new thinking at GM incorporated the systems and structures that originated from American Motors's lean and focused operations.

Renault implemented the lessons it learned from its investment in American Motors. The French firm took a parallel approach as it did with its initial ownership of American Motors and applied it to resurrect the money-losing Nissan automaker in Japan.

In 2009, in a deal brokered by the Obama administration, Italian automaker Fiat initiated a white knight takeover of Chrysler to save the struggling automaker from liquidation. The deal was immediately compared to the American Motors-Renault deal; some commentators noted the irony in that Chrysler now faced the same fate that American Motors faced 30 years earlier, while others expressed skepticism of whether the Italian firm could save Chrysler, given how the Renault deal failed. However, there were crucial differences between the two:

- Fiat CEO Sergio Marchionne became CEO of Chrysler as part of the deal and immediately began globally integrating Fiat and Chrysler's assets and product lines.
- The Fiat-Chrysler merger did not face the political opposition the American Motors-Renault deal did since a family group led Fiat with significant equity, and the U.S. government supported the merger.
- While American Motors proved to be a continuous money-loser for Renault, Chrysler returned to profitability fairly quickly and became an essential source of revenue and profits for Fiat, which has been struggling to maintain volume and profitability amid the European debt crisis.

The two firms would later fully merge to create Fiat Chrysler Automobiles in 2014, and would further merge with the French firm PSA Group, owners of the Citroën and Peugeot brands, to form Stellantis in 2021.

== Legacy of products ==
=== Passenger automobiles ===
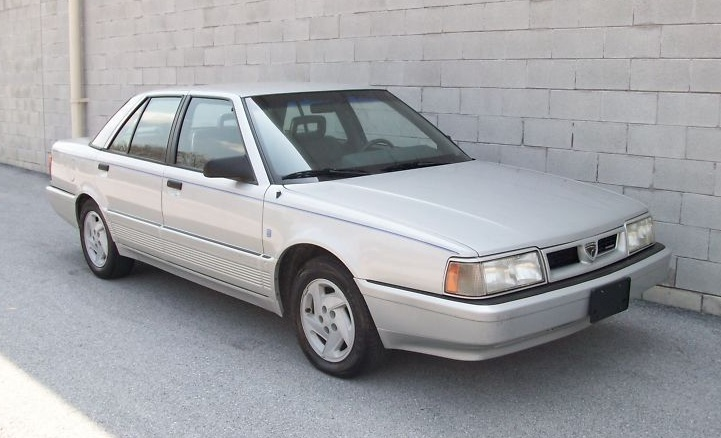
Eagle Premier

Chrysler revived the "Spirit" name, which was discontinued by AMC after 1983 for use on one of its A platform cars (the Dodge Spirit) from 1989 until 1995. The planned Renault Medallion was sold as the Eagle Medallion in 1988 and 1989. The planned all-new 1988 Renault Premier, a joint development effort between American Motors and Renault, and for which the Brampton Assembly plant (Brampton, Ontario — originally called the Bramalea Plant) was built, was sold by Chrysler as the 1988–1992 Eagle Premier, with a rebadged Dodge Monaco variant available from 1990 through 1992. The full-sized Premier's platform was far more advanced than anything Chrysler was building. After some re-engineering and a re-designation to Chrysler code LH, the Eagle Premier went on to form the backbone of Chrysler's passenger car lineup during the 1990s as the Chrysler Concorde (a revived model name that was briefly used by Plymouth in 1951 and 1952—and AMC itself only a decade before), Chrysler New Yorker, Chrysler LHS, Dodge Intrepid, and Eagle Vision. Plymouth almost received their rendition of the LH platform, which was to be called the Accolade. Still, Chrysler decided to drop this version just before LH production started. The Chrysler 300M was likewise a Premier/LH-derived car and was initially to have been the next-generation Eagle Vision until the Eagle brand was dropped after 1998. The LH Platform was subsequently re-engineered, using Mercedes-Benz components, into the Chrysler LX Platform, which was the basis for the Chrysler 300, Dodge Charger, and Dodge Challenger. Chrysler's successor Stellantis later revived the Hornet name in 2023 for Dodge as a rebadged variant of the Alfa Romeo Tonale.

=== Jeep vehicles ===
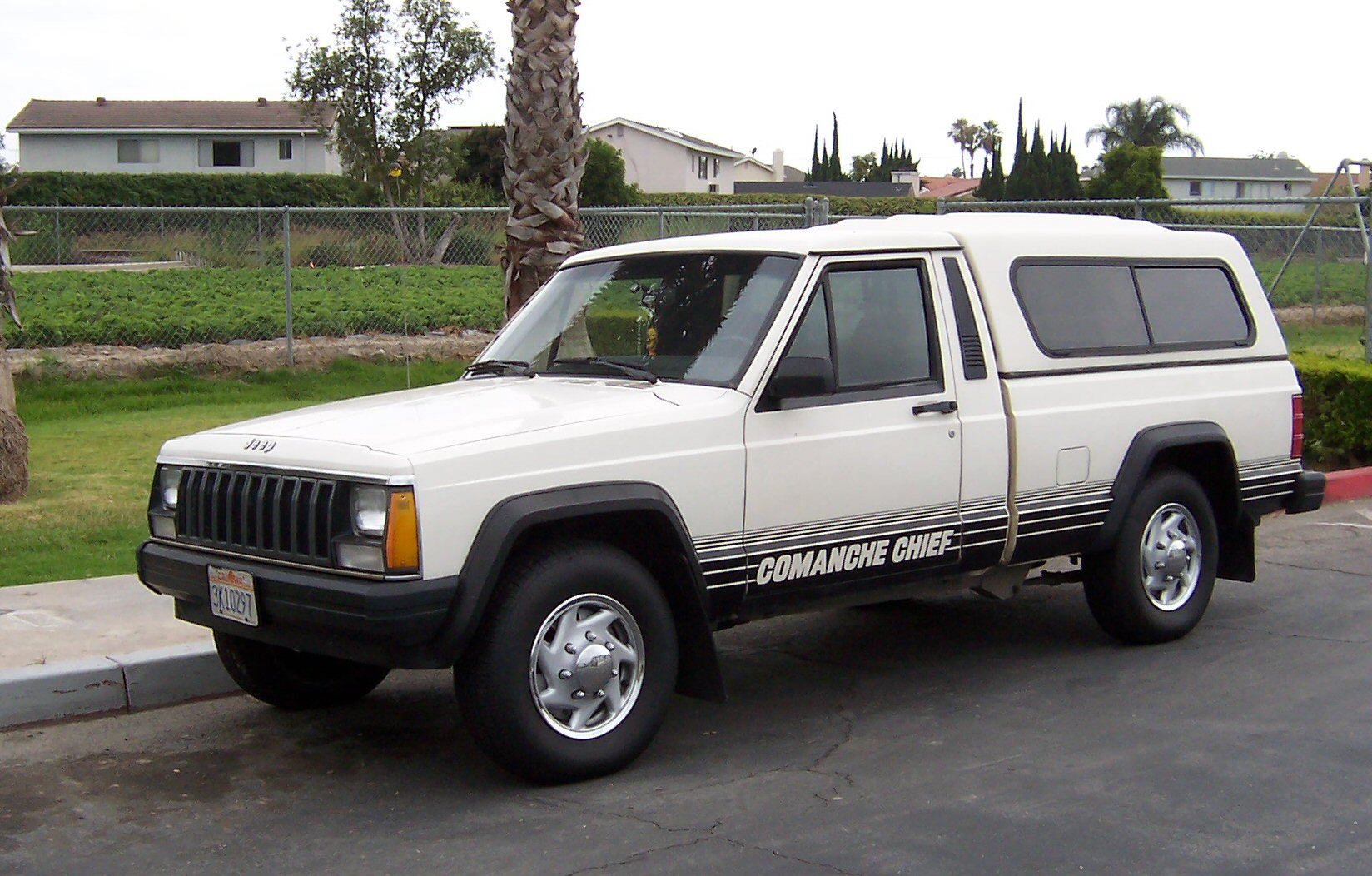
Jeep Comanche

Chrysler marketed the SJ Jeep Grand Wagoneer until 1991, leaving it almost entirely unaltered from the final American Motors rendition before the buyout. The Jeep Comanche pickup truck remained until 1992, while the Cherokee remained until 2001 in the United States. The XJ Cherokee was produced in China through 2006 as the Cherokee 2500 (2.5L) and Cherokee 4000 (4.0L). Although it was not introduced until 1993, the Jeep Grand Cherokee was initially an American Motors-developed vehicle.

Traces of American Motors remained within. American Motors' Toledo, Ohio, plants continued to manufacture the Jeep Wrangler and Liberty, as well as parts and components for Chrysler, Dodge, and Jeep vehicles (although Toledo Machining and Forge were closed in 2005). Although heavily downsized, American Motors' main plant in Wisconsin operated as the Kenosha Engine Plant, producing engines for several Chrysler Group products, including the Wrangler. The plant was closed as part of the post-bailout restructuring of Chrysler in October 2010. The 4.0 L (242 cu in) engine was used until the 2006 model year by DaimlerChrysler in the Jeep Wrangler. American Motors' technologically advanced Bramalea Assembly and Stamping Plants in Brampton, Ontario, later produced the LX-cars – the Chrysler 300, Dodge Challenger, Dodge Charger, and the now discontinued Dodge Magnum.

In terms of American Motors-related parts, some were used as late as 2006, when the Jeep Wrangler (the last new product introduced by American Motors before the Chrysler deal) was still using the AMC Straight-6 engine in some models, as well as the recessed "paddle" door handles that were used since the 1968 model year by American Motors. Both were retired when the Wrangler was completely redesigned for the 2007 model year.

AM General, sold by American Motors in 1983, is still in business building the American Motors-designed Humvee for American and allied militaries. AM General also built the now-discontinued civilian variant, the H1, and manufactured a Chevrolet Tahoe-derived companion, the H2, under contract to GM, who acquired the rights to the civilian Hummer brand in 1999. GM was forced to phase out the Hummer brand in early 2010 due to its bankruptcy restructuring after offering it for sale, but failing to find a suitable buyer.

Although Chrysler introduced new logos for its brands in the 1990s and again in 2010 after the Fiat Group took control of the company, Jeep still uses the American Motors-era logo introduced shortly after American Motors purchased the brand in 1970. Until the Chrysler purchase, Jeep's logo also featured the American Motors emblem.

== International legacy ==
Beginning in 1960, American Motors' executive vice president of international operations Roy D. Chapin Jr. embarked on a strong international campaign to set up importation and local assembly operations of American Motors vehicles worldwide. In five years, Chapin increased foreign sales to 73,489 cars, which at the same time grew AMC's share of the U.S. export market from 2.5 percent to 14.3 percent.

Chapin successfully established or re-established vehicle assembly operations in Argentina, Australia, Belgium (via Renault of France), Chile, Costa Rica, Germany, Iran, Mexico, New Zealand, Peru, Philippines, South Africa, and Venezuela. He also strengthened international export operations with exports to the United Kingdom, Denmark, Finland, Iceland, and Norway in Europe, and to countries in the Middle East, the Caribbean, and South America.

The Rambler Classic would become the basis of Argentina's future national car, the Torino. After becoming CEO in 1967, Chapin organized the acquisition of Kaiser Jeep from Kaiser Industries in 1970, with American Motors, thereby inheriting all existing international Jeep operations. These helped sustain American Motors during the 1970s and 1980s.

While the Rambler marque had been dropped in the United States after the 1969 model year, all export markets retained the Rambler name, with the longest to retain it being Mexico until 1983.

Argentina

- American Motors vehicles assembled: Ambassador, Classic (from 1964), Jeep
- American Motors vehicles imported: Ambassador, Classic (1962–1963)

Australia

- American Motors vehicles assembled: (by Australian Motor Industries 1961–1976) Rambler Six, Rambler V8, Ambassador (1961–1963), Classic, American, Rebel (sedan and wagon), Matador (sedan and wagon), Javelin (1968–1972), AMX (1969 model only), Hornet (sedan), Matador Coupe X (1974 model only, assembled in 1976), Jeep (by Kaiser Jeep of Australia until 1974, by Jeep Australia from 1978 to 1984)
- American Motors vehicles imported: Rambler Six, Rambler V8 (pre-local assembly), Classic (hardtop), Ambassador (1970 only), Jeep (selected models)

Canada

- American Motors vehicles assembled: Rambler Six (1957 only), Classic, American, Ambassador (until 1968), Rebel, Hornet, Gremlin, Concord, Jeep, Eagle, Spirit
- American Motors vehicles imported: Rambler Six, Rambler V8, Metropolitan (from U.K), Ambassador (after 1968), Matador, Javelin, AMX

Chile

- American Motors vehicles assembled: Classic
- American Motors vehicles imported: N/A

Costa Rica

- American Motors vehicles assembled: Classic (from 1965), American (from 1965), Ambassador (from 1965), Rebel, Matador, Javelin, Hornet, Sportabout, Jeep
- American Motors vehicles imported: Rambler Six, Rambler V8, Ambassador (until 1965), Classic (until 1965), American (until 1965)

Egypt

- American Motors vehicles assembled: Jeep (from 1978)
- American Motors vehicles imported: N/A

Finland

- American Motors vehicles assembled: N/A
- American Motors vehicles imported: Classic, American, Ambassador, Rebel, Javelin, Hornet, Matador, Jeep

France

- American Motors vehicles assembled: Classic, Rebel (1967 only)
- American Motors vehicles imported: Jeep (by Renault 1980–1986), Javelin, Pacer (by private importer-distributors)

Germany

- American Motors vehicles assembled: Javelin (by Karmann)
- American Motors vehicles imported: Ambassador (from 1969), Rebel (from 1969), AMX (from 1969), Jeep (from 1977), Eagle

India

- American Motors vehicles assembled: Jeep (under license by Mahindra & Mahindra)
- American Motors vehicles imported: N/A

Iran

- American Motors vehicles assembled: American, Jeep
- American Motors vehicles imported: N/A

Japan

- American Motors vehicles assembled: Jeep (under license by Mitsubishi from 1954 to 1998)
- American Motors vehicles imported: Eagle (1985–1989), Jeep Cherokee (XJ)

Mexico

- American Motors vehicles assembled: Rambler Six, Rambler V8, Ambassador (1959 only), American, Classic, Rebel (sedan), Matador, Javelin, AMX, Hornet, Matador Coupe X, Gremlin, Pacer, Spirit, Jeep
- American Motors vehicles imported: Rambler Six (1957–1958), Rambler V8 (1957–1958)

New Zealand

- American Motors vehicles assembled: Rambler Six, Rambler V8, Classic, Rebel (sedan), Jeep
- American Motors vehicles imported: Metropolitan, Rebel (wagon), Rebel (hardtop), Ambassador (1970 only)

Norway

- American Motors vehicles assembled: N/A
- American Motors vehicles imported: Ambassador, Classic, American, Rebel

People's Republic of China

- American Motors vehicles assembled: Jeep (by Beijing Jeep Corporation from 1984)
- American Motors vehicles imported: N/A

Peru

- American Motors vehicles assembled: Classic, American, Rebel
- American Motors vehicles imported: N/A

Philippines

- American Motors vehicles assembled: Classic, American, Javelin
- American Motors vehicles imported: N/A

Switzerland

- American Motors vehicles assembled: N/A
- American Motors vehicles imported: Gremlin, Javelin, Pacer, Jeep

South Africa

- American Motors vehicles assembled: American, Hornet
- American Motors vehicles imported: N/A

South Korea

- American Motors vehicles assembled: Jeep (by Shinjin Motors in partnership with AMC 1974–1981)
- American Motors vehicles imported: N/A

Spain

- American Motors vehicles assembled: Jeep
- American Motors vehicles imported: N/A

Venezuela

- American Motors vehicles assembled: Classic, Javelin, Hornet, Jeep
- American Motors vehicles imported: N/A

United Kingdom

- American Motors vehicles assembled: Metropolitan (by Austin)
- American Motors vehicles imported: Rambler Six, Rambler V8, Classic, Rebel, Ambassador, Matador, Javelin, Pacer (locally converted to RHD), Gremlin (locally converted to RHD)

== Legacy of divisions and facilities ==
=== Former brands and divisions ===
During its history, American Motors bought or created, then later sold and divested itself of several specialized divisions, some of which continue to exist today:

Kelvinator, the subdivision of Nash-Kelvinator, was sold by American Motors in 1968 to White Consolidated Industries and subsequently became part of Electrolux. The Kelvinator Company is still in business.

Jeep is a brand under Stellantis. It was a brand of the Fiat Chrysler Automobiles until January 16, 2021. Many Jeep models retained the mechanical specifications and styling cues developed by American Motors well into the 1990s or even into the first decade of the 2000s.

AM General is now owned by KPS Capital Partners. It was organized as an LLC in August 2004.

Wheel Horse Products Division is now owned by the Toro Company.

Beijing Jeep was established by American Motors in 1984 to produce Jeeps for the burgeoning Chinese market; the joint venture was inherited by Chrysler and is currently owned by Mercedes-Benz Group, which renamed it Beijing Benz. American Motors' trials with the venture were the subject of a book on the venture, "Beijing Jeep", by James Mann.

=== Facilities ===
American Motors World Headquarters (1954–1975) was located at 14250 Plymouth Road in Detroit and was widely known as the Plymouth Road Office Center (PROC). In 1975, American Motors moved its headquarters from the facility on Plymouth Road to a newly constructed building on Northwestern Highway in Southfield, Michigan, known as the American Center.

The initial building was built during 1926–27 by the Electric Refrigeration Corporation (subsequently Nash-Kelvinator) with design by Amedeo Leoni, industrial layout by Wallace McKenzie, and tower enclosure and industrial units by William E. Kapp of SHG. The original 600,000 sq ft (56,000 m^{2}) three-story factory and four-story administration building had been headquarters to Nash-Kelvinator from 1937 until 1954, as well as a factory for refrigerators, electric ranges, and commercial refrigeration—as well as airplane propellers for the U.S. military effort during World War II.

During World War II, the U.S. War Department contracted with Nash-Kelvinator to produce 900 Sikorsky R-6 model helicopters. As part of that contract, a 4.5 acres (1.8 ha) site north of the factory was used as the smallest airport in the world as a flight testing base. Nash-Kelvinator produced about 50 R-6s a month during the war. When the contract was terminated at the war's end, 262 helicopters had been constructed.

During Chrysler's occupancy of the complex, it was known as Jeep and (Dodge) Truck Engineering (JTE), including facilities for body-on-frame work as well as testing facilities and labs. The buildings included 1,500,000 square feet (140,000 m^{2}), approximately one-third devoted to engineering and computer functions.

As of 2007, Chrysler employed over 1,600 people at the complex, moving those operations in mid-2009 to the Chrysler Technology Center. The property was put up for sale by Chrysler in early 2010. It was bought by a local man who gutted the building for scrap and left it in a dilapidated state before losing it to foreclosure. The abandoned building was in possession of the city of Detroit and officials were considering if the industrial site would be more marketable if the building was torn down. In 2018, the Wayne County Commission approved a land swap that included a new jail complex for the county as well as a potential revival for the old American Motors building.

- American Center – American Motors' corporate headquarters in Southfield, Michigan, is still standing, still open, and still called "American Center". The original "American Center" signage at the top of the building remained until 2005. However, the American Motors logo has been removed. The signage has since been changed to Charter One. The 25-story building is rented to several organizations and companies as office space. After the Chrysler acquisition, Chrysler Financial occupied as much as 175,000 square feet (16,300 m^{2}) of the building.
- Toledo South Assembly Plants – Torn down by Chrysler in 2007. Until it was demolished, most of the signage outside the factories was still visible, and there were areas where Chrysler painted over the American Motors logo.
- Toledo Forge – Torn down by Chrysler in 2007.
- Brampton (formerly Bramalea) Assembly and Satellite Stamping Plants – Still in use by Chrysler. American Motors designed this US$260 million (US$805,733,504 in 2025 dollars), 2,500,000-square-foot (230,000 m^{2}) plant, which was operational by 1986. This plant was designed and built by American Motors for the specific purpose of building the Eagle Premier. Like the older Brampton plant, this factory was also part of American Motors (Canada) Ltd., and with the Chrysler buyout in 1987, it became part of Chrysler Canada Limited. The plant built the LX vehicles: the Chrysler 300, the Dodge Charger, and the Dodge Challenger.
- Kenosha "Main" Plant – Portions of the Kenosha Main Plant (later Chrysler's Kenosha Engine plant with some new additions) at 52nd Street and 30th Avenue continued to be run by Chrysler as an engine-production factory. This plant closed in October 2010 as part of Chrysler LLC's Chapter 11 bankruptcy procedure which resulted from the automotive industry crisis. Demolition of the plant began in early December 2012.
- Canadian Fabricated Products Ltd. – An American Motors division (part of American Motors of Canada) in Stratford, Ontario; established in 1971 and sold post-buyout by Chrysler in 1994; produced automotive interior trim.
- Guelph Products – An American Motors division (also part of American Motors of Canada) in Guelph, Ontario; opened in 1987 and subsequently sold by Chrysler in early 1993; the operation supplied molded plastic components to the Brampton Assembly Plant.
- Coleman Products Corporation – An American Motors subsidiary in Coleman, Wisconsin. Manufactured automotive wiring harnesses for American Motors and other automakers.
- Evart Products Co. – An American Motors subsidiary in Evart, Michigan. The plant was established in 1953 with 25 workers and eventually expanded to over 1,200, becoming Osceola County's largest employer. This factory manufactured injection molded plastic parts (notably, grilles) for American Motors (supplying 90% of in-house needs), as well as for other automakers. In 1966, Products Wire Harness was built. After Chrysler purchased American Motors, Collins & Aikman took over the factory.
- Mercury Plastics Co. – Mercury Plastics operated a plant at 34501 Harper Ave., Mt. Clemens, Michigan. The company was acquired in 1973 for 611,111 shares of American Motors stock. The company produced plastic parts for American Motors, as well as for uses in other industries.
- Windsor Plastics Co. – Windsor Plastics, 601 North Congress Avenue, Evansville, Indiana, was acquired in 1970. The division produced plastic parts for American Motors and other industries. The company was sold to Guardian Industries in 1982 and underwent a name change to Guardian Automotive Trim, Inc. It is still in operation. The original factory in Evansville continues to manufacture plastic parts for the OEM and aftermarket automotive industries. Items manufactured include grilles, bezels, and other parts.
- The American Motors Proving Grounds – The former 300 acres (1.2 km^{2}; 0.47 sq mi) American Motors Proving Grounds in Burlington, Wisconsin, had initially been Nash's test track and subsequently became Jeep's test facilities (after American Motors acquired Kaiser Jeep in the 1970s). The grounds were disused after Chrysler's takeover of American Motors in 1987. Subsequently, they became the engineering and test facility for MGA Research. The company rents out this proving grounds to the National Highway Traffic Safety Administration (NHTSA), for "ride-and-drive" events by automakers, as well as for movies and commercials.
- Axle tooling equipment – Sold in 1985 to Dana Holding Corporation, and they named the AMC-15 axles as Dana 35. Dana manufactured the AMC-20 axles for AM General's Hummer H1. The company also continues to produce the AMC-15 axle; however, they have been upgraded from American Motors' original design with multiple variations (including front axle designs).
- Holmes Foundry, Ltd. – American Motors' block-casting foundry was a major American Motors factory now obliterated. Holmes had its main office and foundry at 200 Exmouth Street, Sarnia, Ontario, Canada. Holmes was established in 1918 by J. S. Blunt and was called Holmes Blunt Limited. In the early years, Ford Motor Company contracted the plant for a steady supply of engine casting blocks. This factory had a local reputation as a dirty, dangerous workplace. The company had three divisions, all operating on one site at the edge of Sarnia. Beginning in 1962, American Motors contracted with Holmes Foundry to supply American Motors with cylinder block castings. American Motors acquired 25% interest in the foundry in January 1966. In July 1970, American Motors acquired 100% of Holmes Foundry through an exchange of shares, making it a wholly owned subsidiary. However, it was not until October 1981 that Holmes Foundry finally became a division of American Motors of Canada. As part of its acquisition of American Motors in 1987, Chrysler Corporation took ownership of the Holmes facility and its manufacturing business but closed the operation on September 16, 1988. The industrial facilities were cleaned of their environmental contaminants in 2005 in preparation for a new highway interchange to be built on the site.
- Kenosha "Lakefront" (Kenosha, Wisconsin) Plant – The American Motors plant in downtown Kenosha along Lake Michigan was razed, and after reclamation, the land was used for new development. At the company's inception in 1954, the plant covered 3,195,000 sq ft (296,800 m^{2}) and, together with the Milwaukee plant, had an annual production capacity of 350,000 cars. In 1977, the factory was used for the car-production scenes for the movie The Betsy.
- Milwaukee Body (Milwaukee, Wisconsin) Plant – American Motors inherited a 1,600,000 sq ft (150,000 m^{2}) body plant in Milwaukee from Nash. The plant had been the main body plant for the Seaman Body Corporation, which did a lot of business assembling bodies of various designs with Nash and other makers. Nash had purchased half of this company in 1919 and took over the remaining half in 1936. For American Motors, the plant was sometimes a problem. For example, in late 1961, George Romney stormed through the plant and threatened to close it and eliminate its 9,000 jobs due to labor problems. The plant survived until the Chrysler buyout. Chrysler later decided to dispose of the factory. Upon closure, the site was named a Superfund site. The factory was demolished, and the site was rehabilitated and redeveloped.
- Danforth Ave (Toronto, Ontario) Plant – Inherited from Nash. This plant was purchased by Nash from Ford of Canada in 1946. The first Canadian-built Nash rolled off the line in April 1950. Upon the formation of American Motors in 1954, the plant assembled 1955 Nash and Hudson Ramblers (2 and 4-door sedans), as well as Nash Canadian Statesman and Hudson Wasp (4-door sedans). In 1956, the plant continued to assemble the Nash and Hudson Rambler (4-door sedans and wagons) and the Nash Canadian Statesman (4-door sedan), but the Hudson Wasp was imported. That same year, American Motors (Canada) Limited was formed – taking over Nash Motors of Canada Limited and Hudson Motors of Canada Limited. In 1957, American Motors assembled the Rambler Six and Rambler Rebel V8 at the Danforth plant. American Motors closed the plant in July 1957 and imported Ramblers into Canada until 1961. The structure remains today as the Shoppers World Danforth Lowe's store.
- Tilbury, Ontario Assembly Plant – Another plant American Motors inherited from the 1954 merger, this one via Hudson. Specifically, it was a contract with CHATCO Steel Products, which owned the plant. American Motors ceased Hudson production at the Tilbury plant in 1955.
- Brampton Assembly Plant – American Motors opened a plant in 1960 in Brampton, Ontario, Canada. It was part of American Motors of Canada. Rambler Drive, a small street just west of this plant, still exists and leads into a residential subdivision built in the 1960s. In 1987, with the Chrysler buyout, the division and the plant were absorbed, becoming part of Chrysler Canada Limited. The plant was closed in 1994 and sold to Wal-Mart for use as their Canadian warehouse. This plant/warehouse was demolished in 2004 and redeveloped in 2007, with multiple smaller commercial buildings now onsite; a new Lowes Home Improvement Warehouse now takes up the most extensive section of this commercial development. Note that this is a separate facility from the current Brampton (formerly Bramalea) Assembly and Satellite Stamping Plants nearby.
- South Charleston Stamping Plant – A South Charleston, West Virginia, facility. While American Motors leased it, the plant stamped steel automotive parts. American Motors announced it would expand productive capacity in 1974 when automobile sales were not increasing. Most of the stamping work for AMC cars was performed by suppliers. The automaker aimed to integrate body panel stamping into its manufacturing system. The initial phase of development for the plant called for four press lines until 1977, but a fifth line was added to the operation late summer of 1976. The facility also incorporated AMC's international operations by importing steel from Belgium and shipping body parts to assembly plants in Canada and Mexico, as well as to its Milwaukee and Kenosha factories. Parts for the Gremlin, Hornet, and Pacer were produced in West Virginia. Some of the new equipment installed by AMC was financed by industrial revenue bonds issued by Kanawha County with the debt to be retired through the lease payments from AMC. In 1978, Volkswagen of America purchased the plant. The sale generated an undisclosed amount of cash for AMC after posting a $46 million loss for 1977 and the agreement will be for VW continue to supply stampings to AMC after taking over the plant in January 1978. The facility supplied stampings for the Volkswagen Westmoreland Assembly Plant but subsequently VW sold the plant when it ceased production at Westmoreland in 1988. It was purchased by Park Corporation of Cleveland, Ohio. In October 2006, Union Stamping and Assembly declared bankruptcy. The current owner of the facility is Gestamp. The plant is used to design and make metal components for vehicles. In 2023, the company announced an investment of $69.5 million over two years to create 100 jobs and make metal parts for electric vehicles. West Virginia government provided a $7.5 million incentive.

=== Former subsidiaries and affiliates ===
- AM General
- Arab American Vehicles
- Beijing Jeep
- Shinjin Jeep Motors
- Vehículos Automotores Mexicanos
- American Motors Sales Corp.
- American Motors Realty Corp.
- American Motors Leasing Corp.
- Evart Production Co.
- Coleman Products Co.
- American Motors Pan American Corp.
- Jeep Corp.
- McDonald Molding, Inc.
- Mercury Plastics Co.
- Rantoul Products, Inc.
- American Motors (Canada) Ltd.
- Rambler Motors (A.M.C.) Ltd. (United Kingdom)
- American Motors Corporation de Venezuela, C.A.
- American Motors Financial Corp.
- Jeep Australia Pty. Ltd.
- Jeep de Venezuela S.A.

== Earlier use of the name ==
The era of 1900 until 1925 saw various corporations, in several U.S. states, use similar "American" names, such as American Motor Carriage Company (Ohio, 1902–1903), American Automobile Manufacturing Company (Indiana, 1911–1912), and American Motors Incorporated (New York, 1919–1920). In 1916, an earlier "American Motors Corporation", apparently unrelated to the more famous later corporation of the same name, was formed in Newark, New Jersey, with Louis Chevrolet as vice president and chief engineer. By 1918, it was producing cars in a plant at Plainfield, New Jersey. In 1923, it merged with the Bessemer Motor Truck Company of Pennsylvania into Bessemer–American Motors Corporation, which lasted less than a year before merging with the Winther and Northway companies into Amalgamated Motors. The latter company ceased soon after.

== Later reuse of the trademark ==
A new company was formed in Palmdale, California, in 2001. Registration for the American Motors trademarks was filed in 2001 by this California-based firm. The company's website specifically claimed no affiliation to the previous American Motors but used American Motors' history and logos on its website. The website is now dead, and the company's claims to American Motors' trademarks expired in 2005.

The new Chrysler LLC holds a live registration for the name "American Motors", which was applied for in 2005. The "AMC" wordmark, complete with "A-mark" graphic logo, as was originally used in 1970 and through the late-1980s, was registered and published for comment by Chrysler as of 2010.

== Passenger cars ==
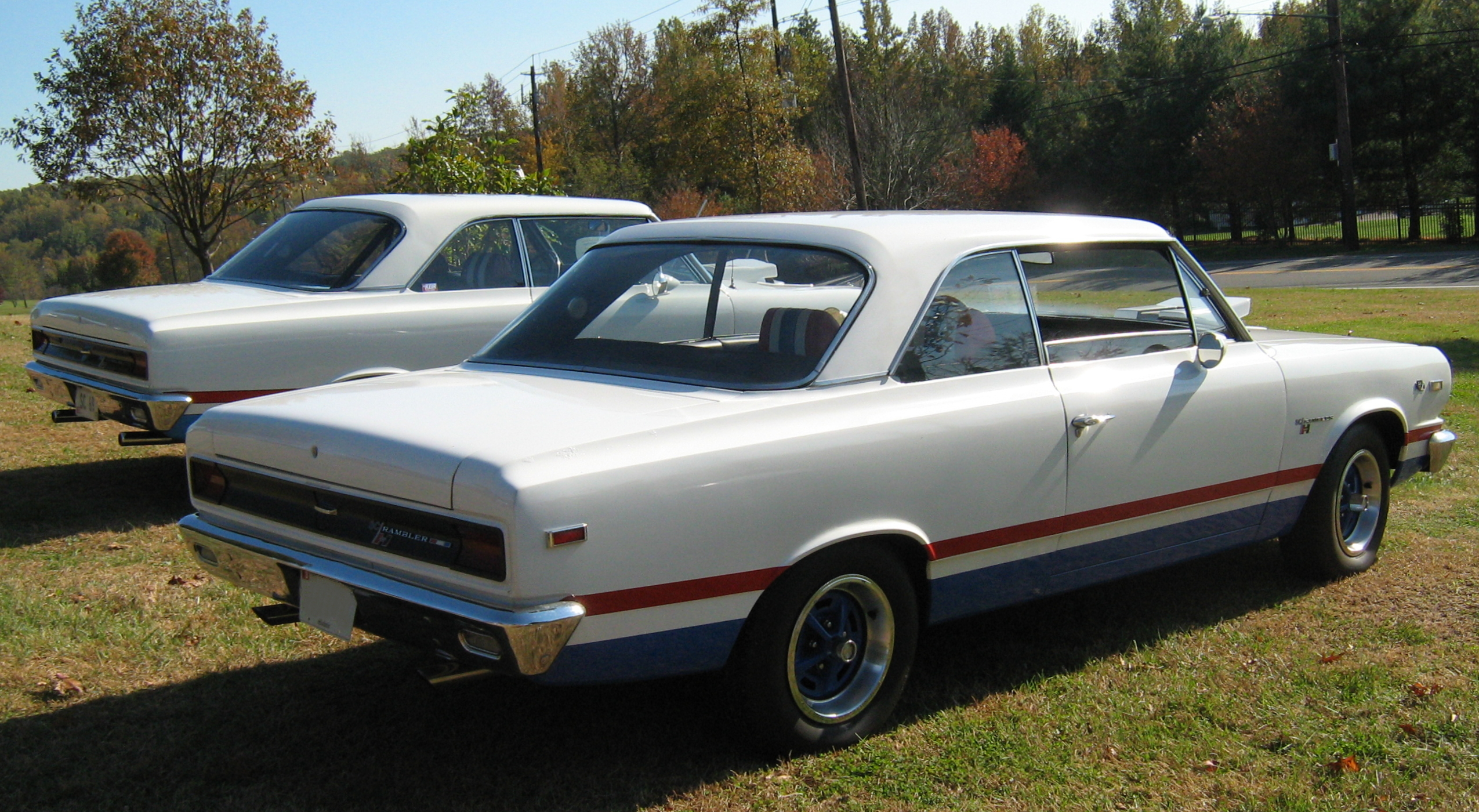
1969 SC/Rambler

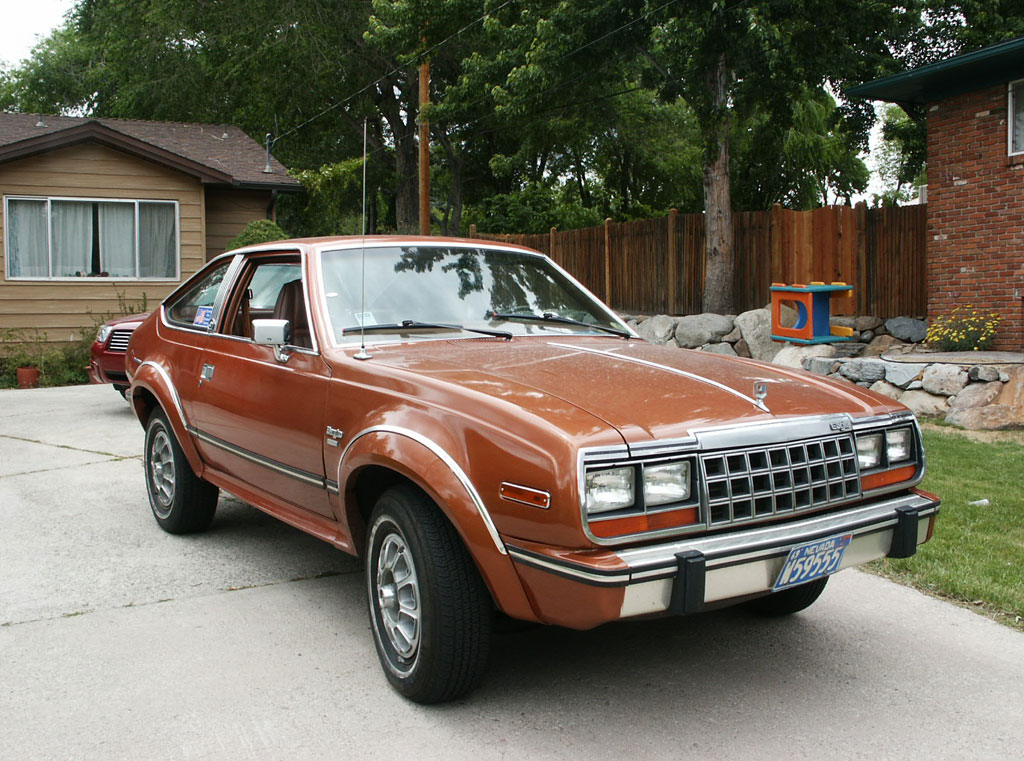
1982 Eagle SX/4

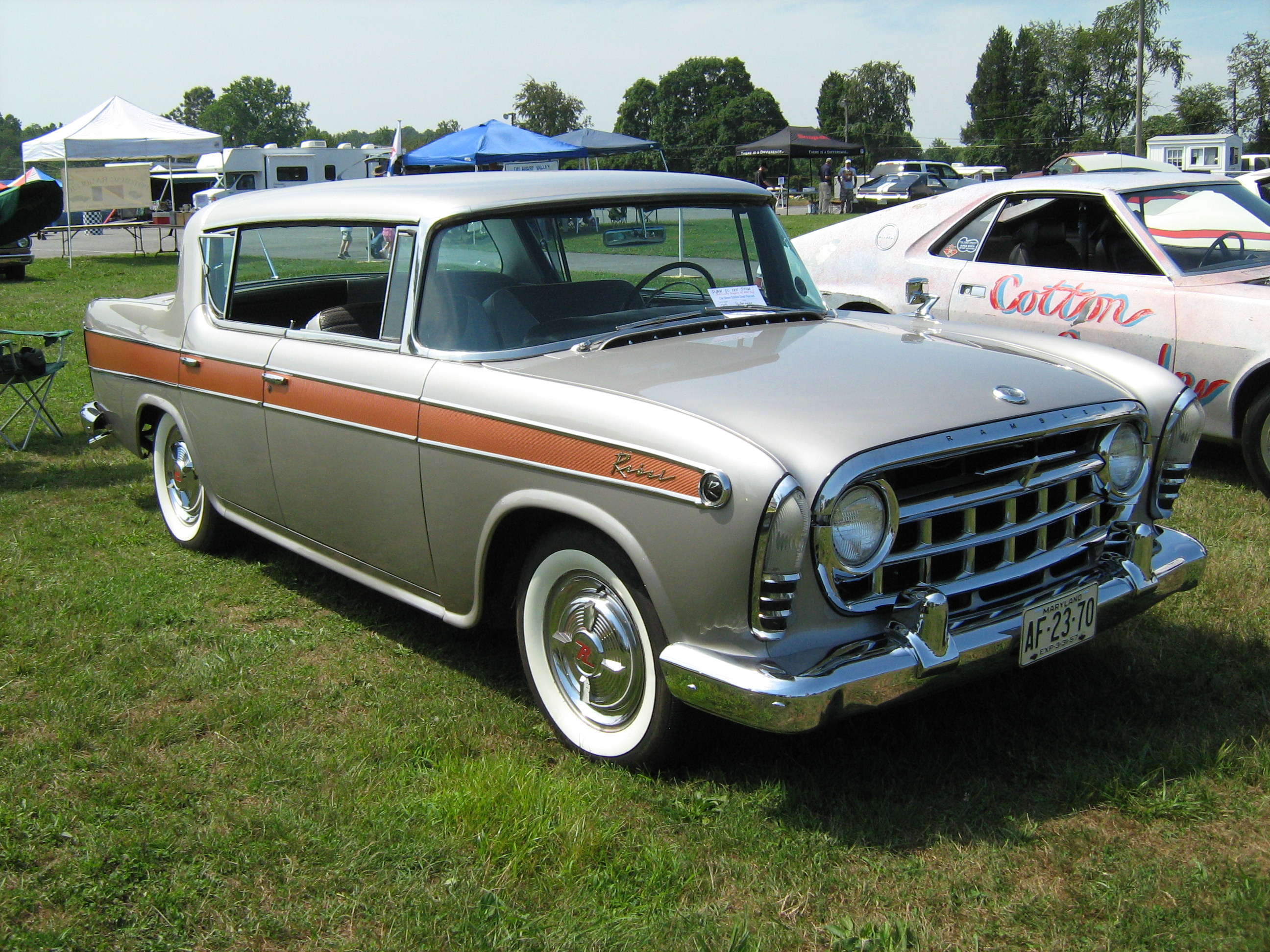
1957 Rambler Rebel

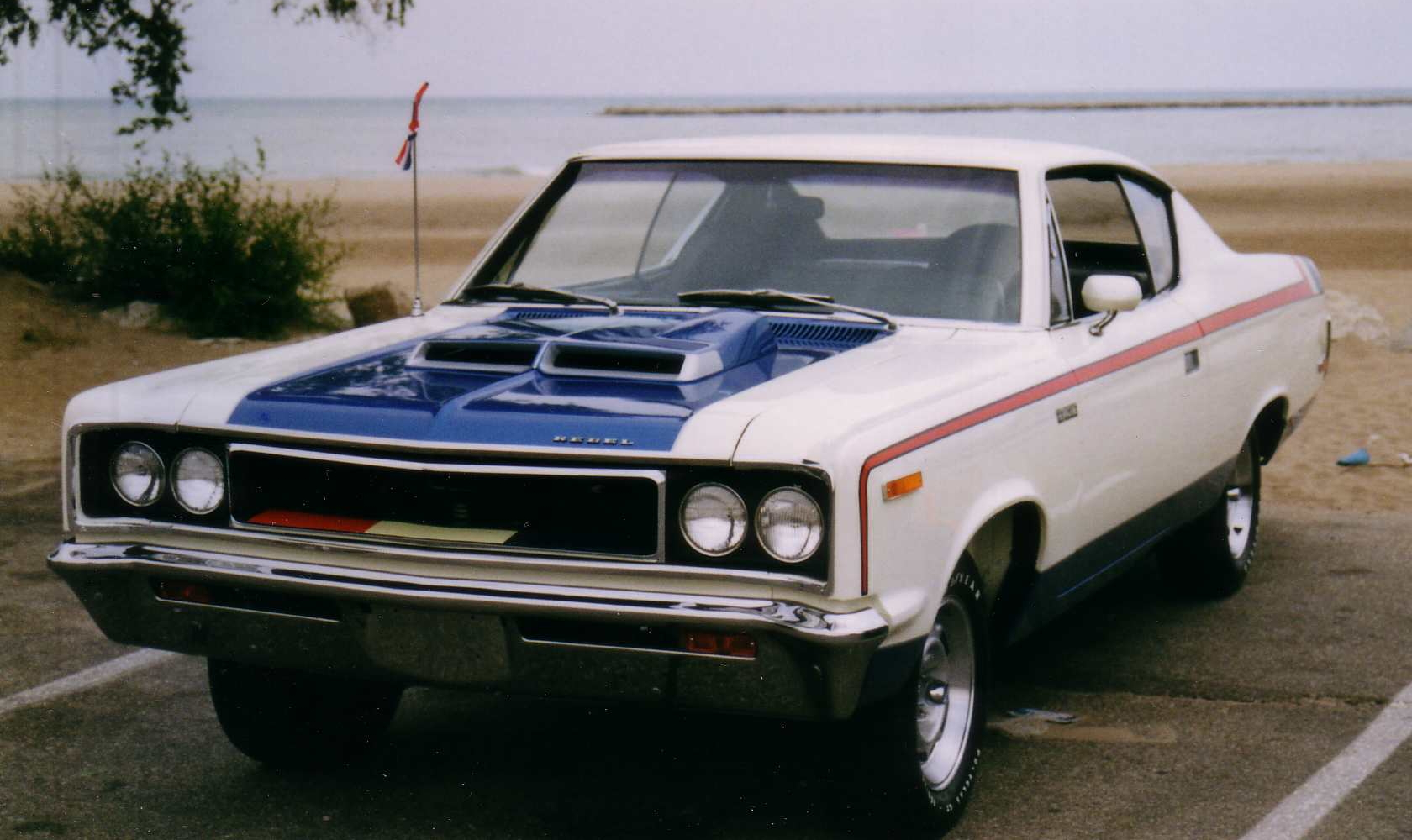
1970 The Machine

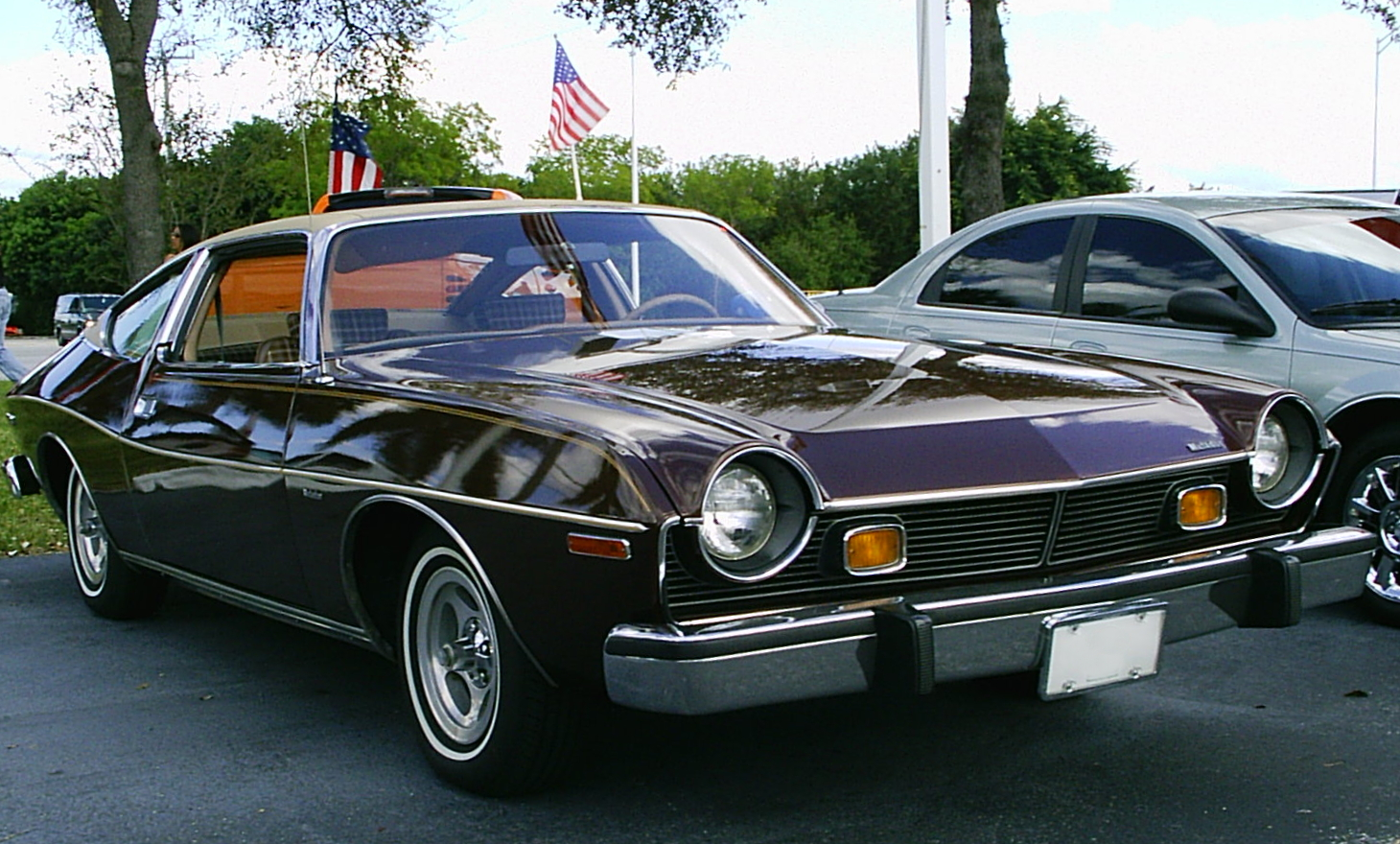
1976 Matador coupe

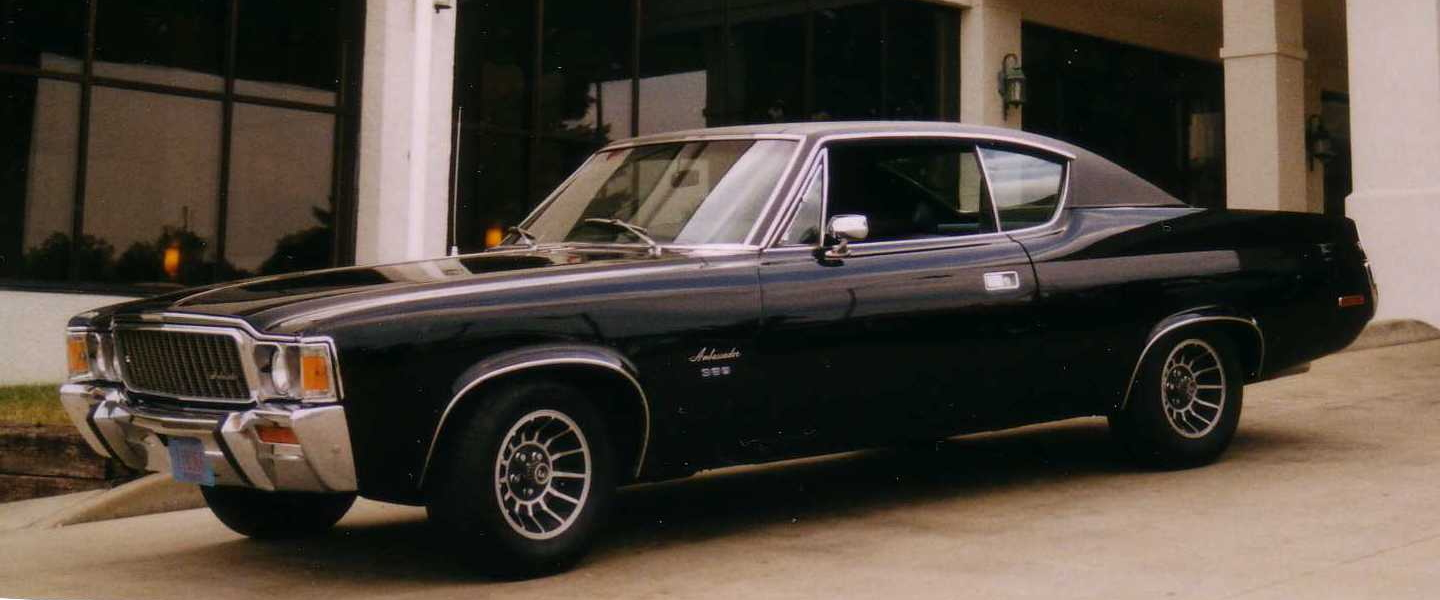
1971 Ambassador

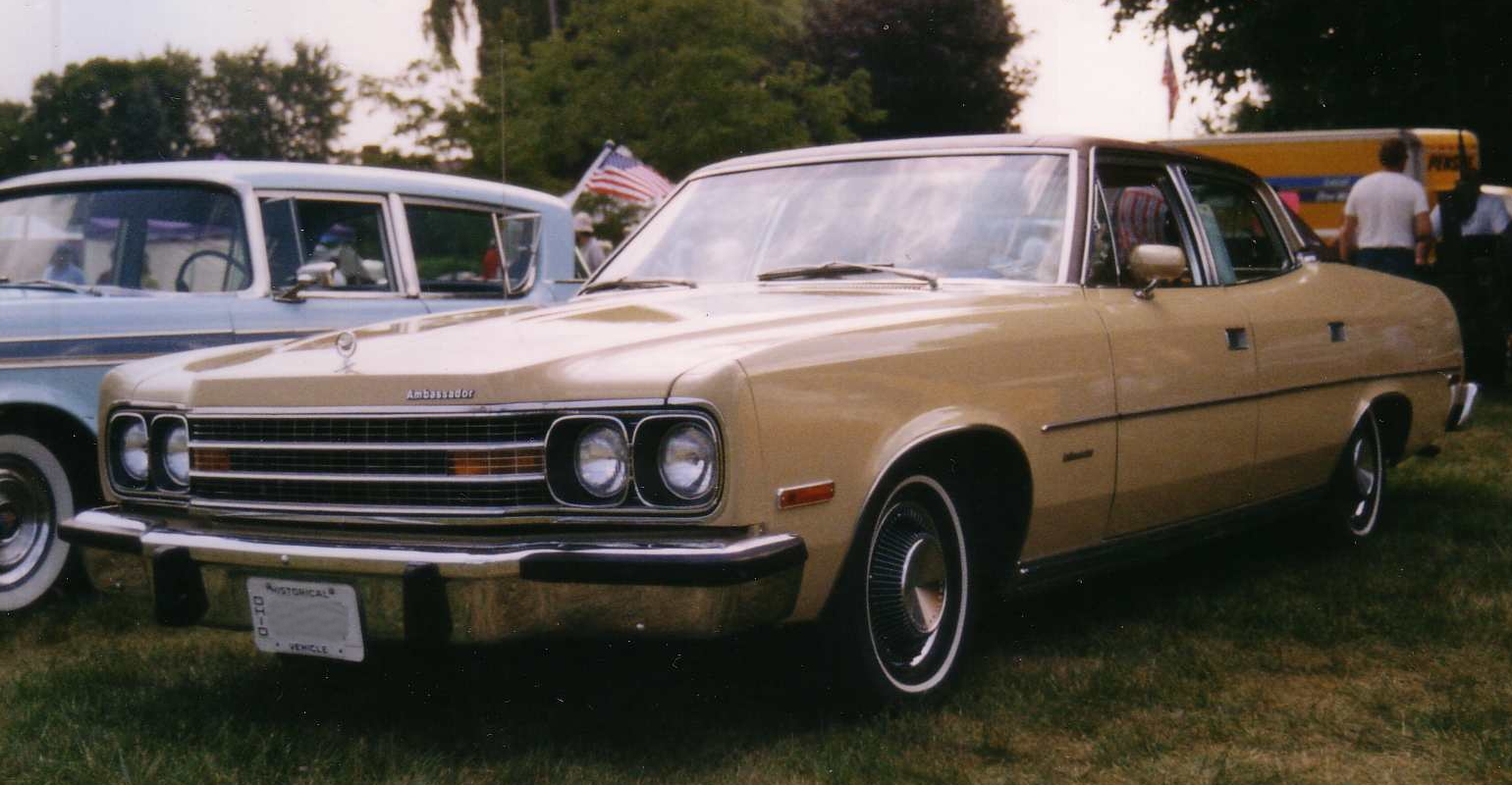
1974 Ambassador

Subcompact

- 1955–1962: Metropolitan*
- 1970–1978: AMC Gremlin**
- 1979–1983: AMC Spirit
- 1981–1983: AMC Eagle (SX/4 and Kammback)
- 1983–1987: Renault Alliance – based on the Renault 9.
- 1984–1987: Renault Encore – based on the Renault 11.
- 1987 only: Renault GTA – based on the Renault 9.

* – The Metropolitan was introduced by Nash in 1954.
** – The Gremlin was the company's first modern subcompact.

Compact

- 1955–1956: Nash/Hudson Rambler
- 1956–1957: Rambler Six/Rambler Rebel
- 1958–1969: Rambler American
- 1970–1977: AMC Hornet
- 1975–1980: AMC Pacer
- 1978–1983: AMC Concord
- 1988–1989: Eagle Medallion

Mid-size

- 1958–1960: Rambler Six/Rambler Rebel
- 1961–1966: Rambler Classic
- 1958–1964: Rambler Ambassador (1958–1962 also known as "Ambassador by Rambler")
- 1965–1966: Rambler/AMC Marlin
- 1967–1970: Rambler/AMC Rebel
- 1971–1973: AMC Matador

Full-size

- 1955–1956: Hudson Wasp
- 1955–1956: Nash Statesman
- 1955–1957: Hudson Hornet
- 1955–1957: Nash Ambassador
- 1965–1974: Rambler/AMC Ambassador
- 1967: AMC Marlin
- 1974–1978: AMC Matador (sedan and wagon)
- 1988–1992: Eagle Premier

Pony car / Muscle car

- 1968–1970: AMC AMX
- 1968–1974: AMC Javelin

Crossover

- 1980–1988: AMC Eagle

== Engines ==
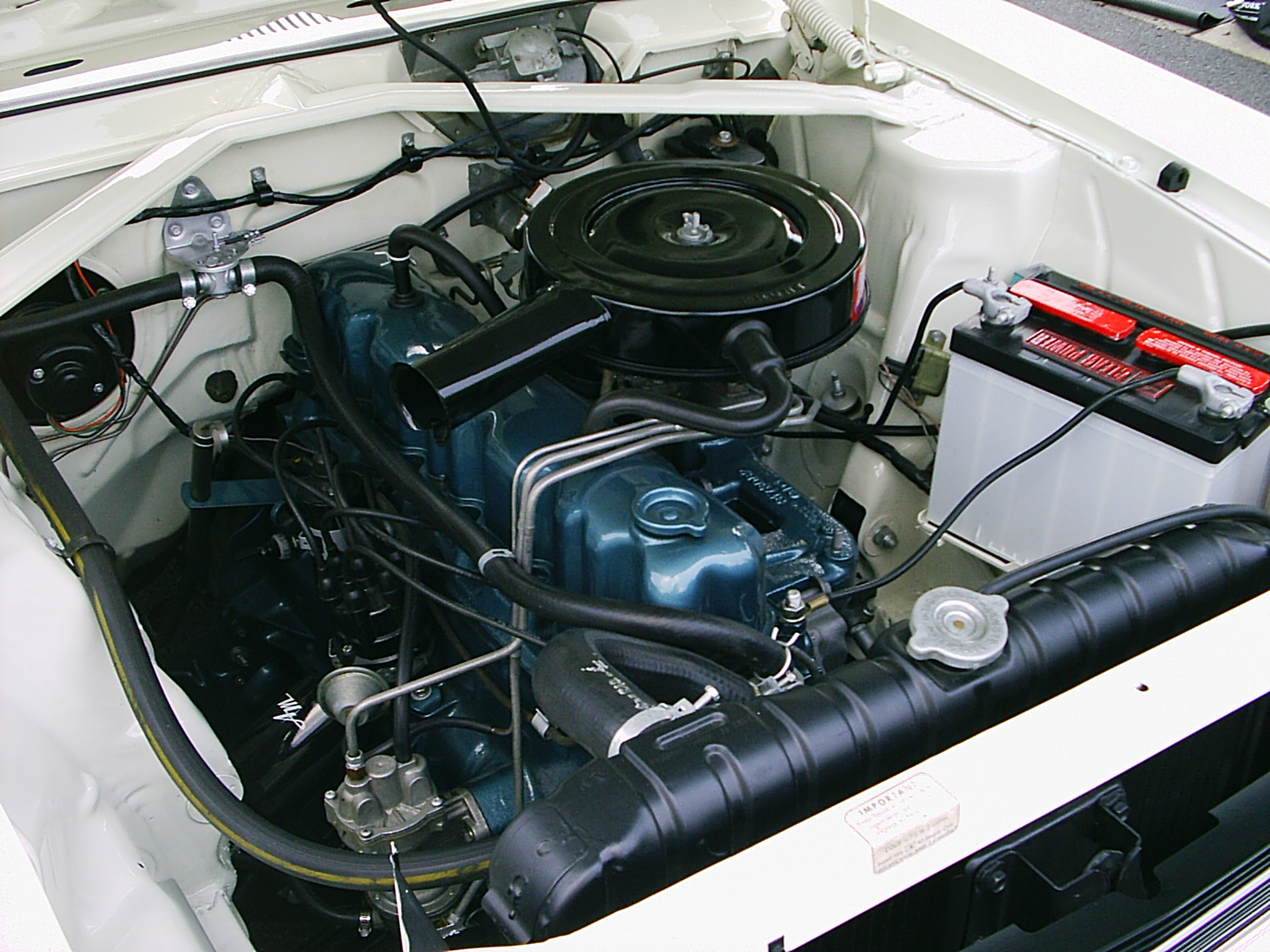
199 six-cylinder

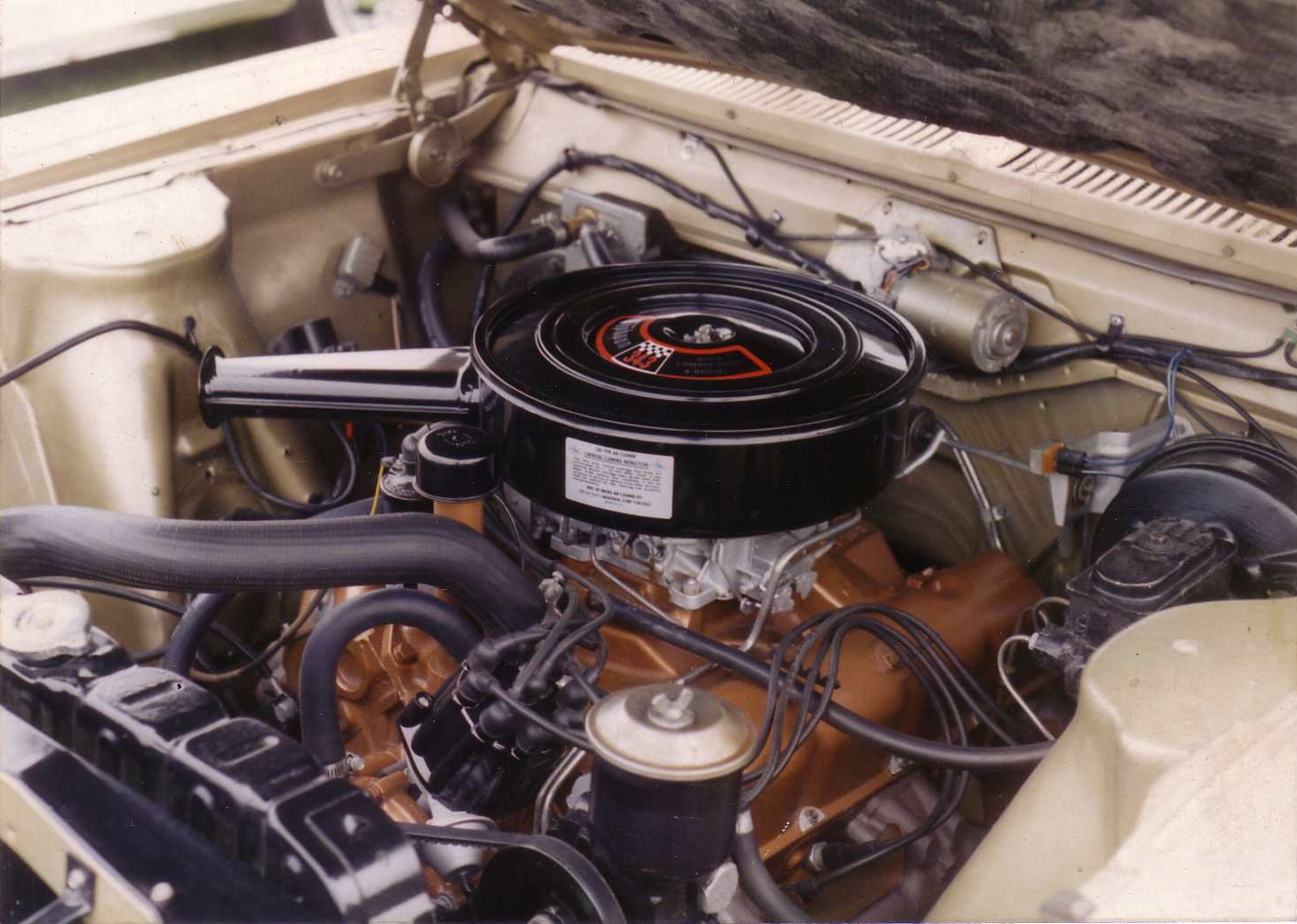
343 4-bbl V8

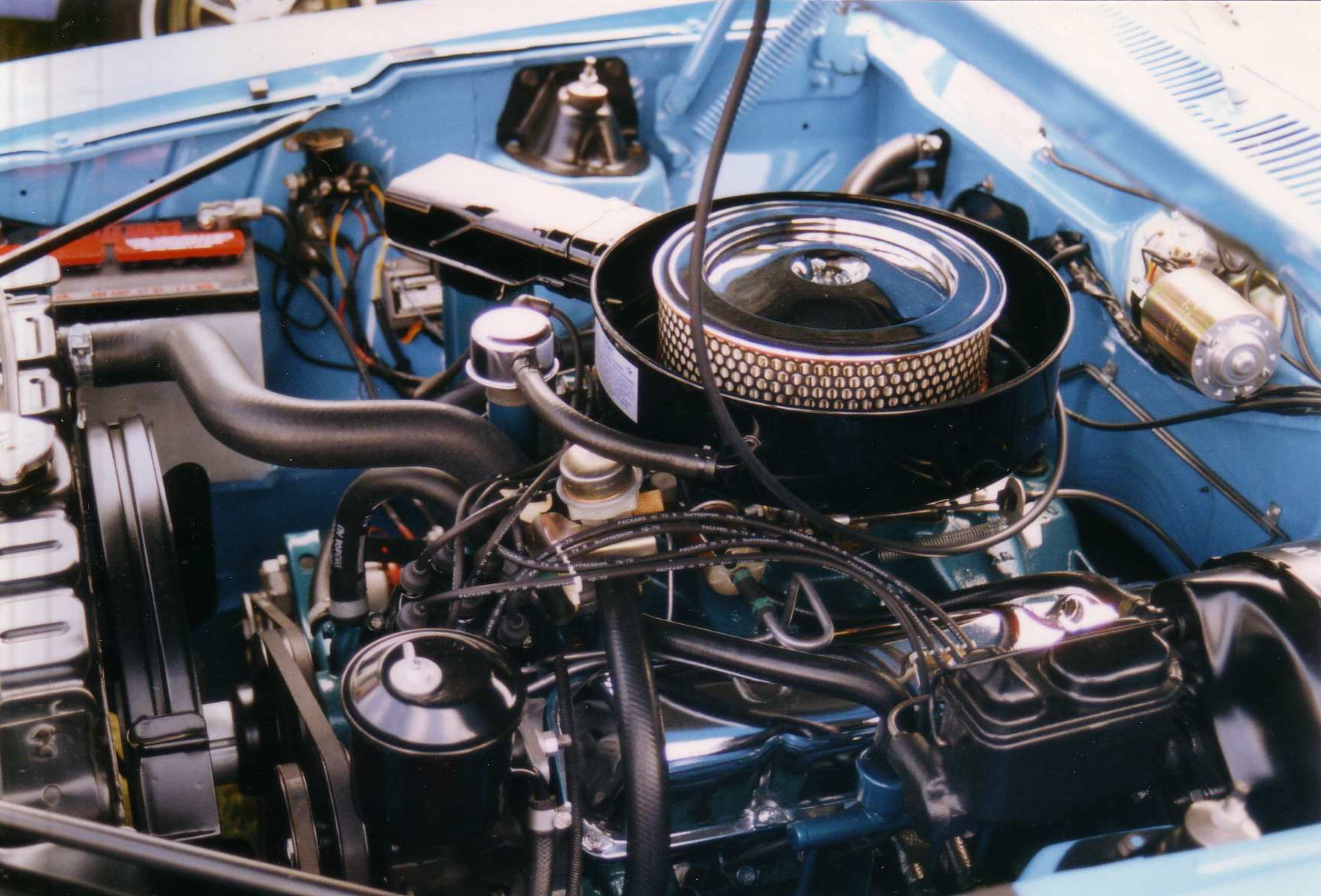
390 Go Pac V8

- 1954–1956:
  - 184 cu in (3.0 L) Nash I6 (Rambler)
  - 196 cu in (3.2 L) Nash L head I6 (Rambler/AMC I6)
  - 252 cu in (4.1 L) Nash I6
  - 320 cu in (5.2 L) Packard built V8
  - 352 cu in (5.8 L) Packard built V8 (Used only 1956)
- 1956–1966:
  - 196 cu in (3.2 L) Rambler I6/AMC I6 (L head and OHV version-ended 1965)
  - 199 cu in (3.3 L) Typhoon Six I6 (Starting in 1966)
  - 232 cu in (3.8 L) Typhoon Six I6 (Beginning in 1964)
  - 250 cu in (4.1 L) AMC V8 (Ending in 1961)
  - 287 cu in (4.7 L) AMC V8 (Beginning in 1963)
  - 327 cu in (5.4 L) AMC V8 (Also used by Kaiser Jeep 1965–1967)
- 1967–1970:
  - 199 cu in (3.3 L) Typhoon Six I6
  - 232 cu in (3.8 L) Typhoon Six I6
  - 290 cu in (4.8 L) AMC V8 (Ending in 1969)
  - 304 cu in (5.0 L) AMC V8 (Beginning in 1970)
  - 343 cu in (5.6 L) AMC V8 (Ending in 1969)
  - 360 cu in (5.9 L) AMC V8 (Beginning in 1970)
  - 390 cu in (6.4 L) AMC V8
- 1971–1980:
  - 121 cu in (2.0 L) AMC I4 ^{1}
  - 232 cu in (3.8 L) AMC I6
  - 258 cu in (4.2 L) AMC I6
  - 304 cu in (5.0 L) AMC V8
  - 360 cu in (5.9 L) AMC V8 (Ending in 1978 for automobiles and through 1991 in Jeeps)
  - 401 cu in (6.6 L) AMC V8 (Ending in 1974 as a regular production order in automobiles; was available in fleet/police use until at least 1975. In 1975, 89 units were installed in Matadors; 4 coupes and 85 sedans-wagons. Available in full-size Jeeps through 1979, also used by International Harvester in 1974 in 1200 series pickups and the Travelall during a strike at International Harvester, though IH called the engine a 400 CID.)
- 1980–1983:
  - 151 cu in (2.5 L) Pontiac Iron Duke I4
  - 258 cu in (4.2 L) AMC I6
- 1984–1986:
  - 2.5 litres (150 cu in) AMC I4
  - 258 cu in (4.2 L) AMC I6
- 1987:
  - 2.5 litres (150 cu in) AMC I4
  - 258 cu in (4.2 L) AMC I6
  - 4.0 litres (242 cu in) AMC I6
- 1988–1989:
  - 2.5 litres (150 cu in) AMC I4
  - 258 cu in (4.2 L) AMC I6
  - 3.0 litres (183 cu in) PRV V6

Also: Kaiser Jeeps used the AMC 327, Buick 225 ("Dauntless V6"), Buick 350 ("Dauntless V8"), and Willys 134 I4 ("Hurricane"). The downsized Jeep XJ Cherokee/Wagoneer used the Chevrolet 2.8 L V6 in 1983–1984.

American Motors contracted with Volkswagen to buy tooling for the Audi 2.0 L OHC I4. Major parts (block, crankshaft, head assembly) were initially purchased from Audi and shipped to the U.S., where American Motors accomplished final assembly at a plant explicitly purchased for the production of this engine. Sales never reached numbers to justify taking over total production. American Motors made several changes to the engine. By contractual agreement, they were prevented from using the Volkswagen or Audi names in association with the American Motors assembled version.

== Collectibility ==
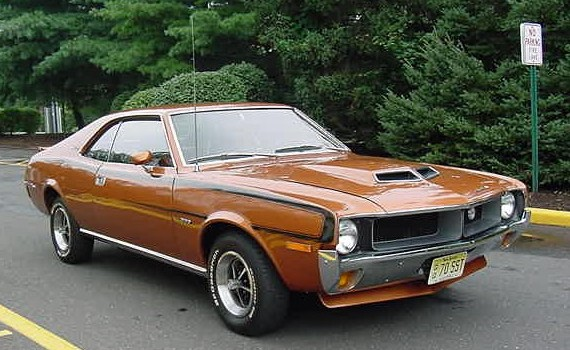
Javelin with "Go" package

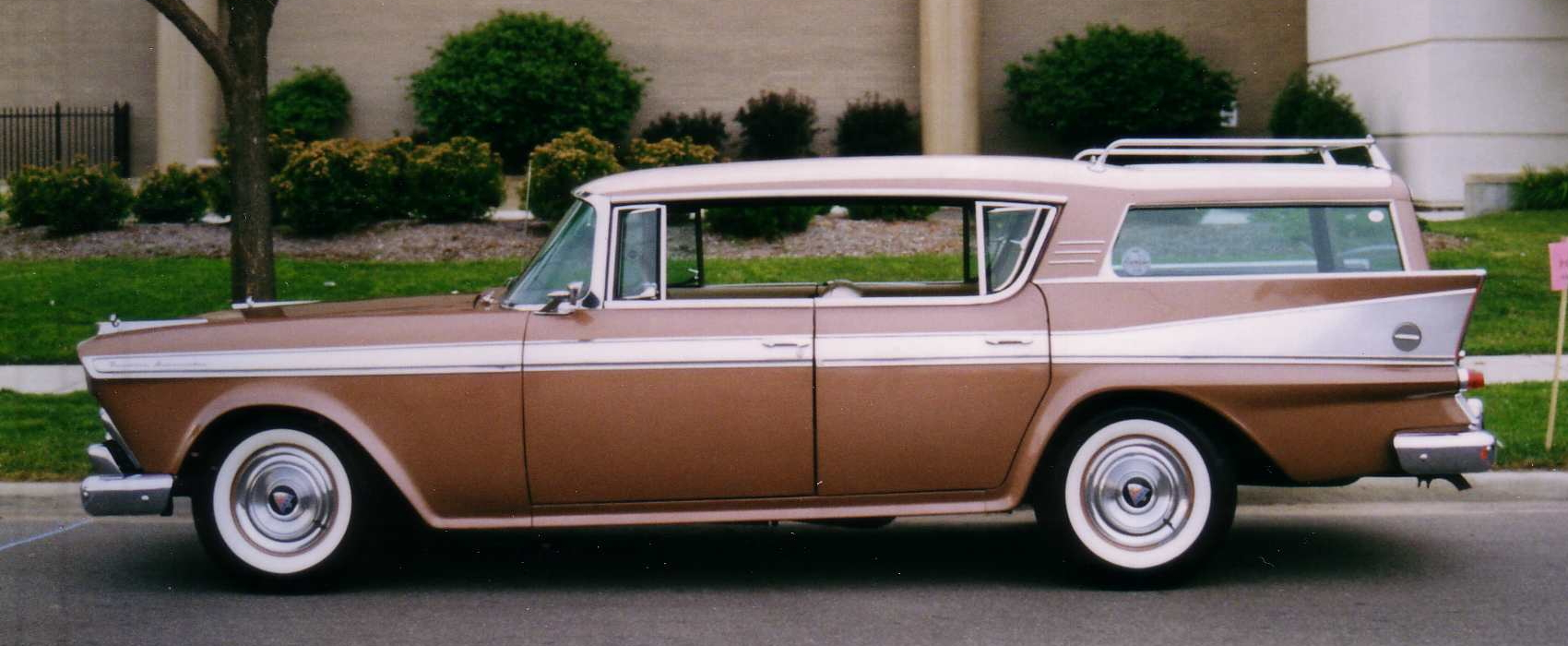
Ambassador hardtop wagon

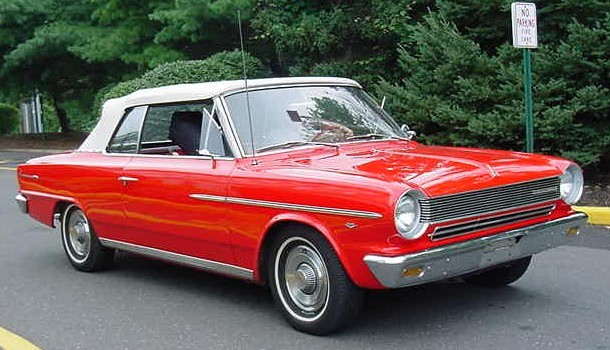
Rambler American convertible

American Motors models historically regarded by hobbyists as particularly "collectible" include the Javelin, AMX, and performance specials such as the 1957 Rambler Rebel, 1965–67 Marlin, 1969 Hurst SC/Rambler, 1970 Rebel Machine, and 1971 Hornet SC/360. These models enjoyed limited popularity when new, resulting in low production figures. In January 2007, the AMC AMX was "really taking off in the muscle car market" according to the editors of Hemmings Classic Car, and it had "left its mark among AMC collectors' minds as a great alternative" to higher-priced Hemi-powered muscle cars.

The early Javelin (1968–70) stands out from the Ford, General Motors, and Chrysler pony cars. Car expert Jack Nerad noted in a 2007 article "several fully restored AMX models" listed for sale at "little more than half the price of a comparable Buick Gran Sport, Chevrolet Chevelle, Olds 4-4-2 or Pontiac GTO" in support of the author's opinion that the 1971–74 Javelin was "clearly an outstanding alternative muscle car for the enthusiast on a budget."

According to James C. Mays, automotive historian and author of The Savvy Guide to Buying Collector Cars at Auction, the "Wow! Factor" is an important and measurable pleasure to an owner whether their car is driven or sits in a climate-controlled garage. His "Wow! Factor" includes examples of a bright red 1969 AMX that, according to its owner, "is just a fast Rambler", but draws more people at events than the more prestigious Ferraris and Lamborghinis, as well as a "million-dollar moment" when a Rambler owner was serenaded with the "Beep Beep" song by The Playmates while fueling at a travel plaza. Moreover, the author's collector car, a 1969 Ambassador station wagon, made friends as strangers came to greet and host him as if "long lost kin". Mays points out the ready availability of parts for American Motors engines and his experiences in having service done on Ramblers without being charged for the work in exchange for the experience of driving a "sassy Rambler" (a 1966 American convertible) and having pictures taken with it.

Other American Motors models, once somewhat ignored by the hobby, are now considered "future collectibles". Examples include the 1959 Ambassador 4-door hardtop station wagon, of which only 578 were produced, and the Jeep Scrambler CJ8, a combined pickup truck-Jeep, of which only a few thousand were made.

Hemmings Classic Car magazine included the 1969–70 Rebel SST and the 1974–78 Matador coupe in their 2008 list of "dollar-for-pound (weight)" cars that could be bought in show-quality condition for a comparatively modest outlay. The writer also noted that "most of AMC's '70s lineup" qualified for inclusion on the list.

The AMC Gremlin is described as having "a cult-like following" in today's collectible car market. The Gremlin shares components with some other American Motors models, making its repair and restoration relatively inexpensive compared with other "historic cars".

The AMC Pacer increased in value according to a Pacer owner who is the CEO of a major insurance provider for collector car owners.

There are active Rambler and American Motors car clubs in the U.S. and elsewhere (examples in External Links).

=== Hot Rod magazine revival April Fool's joke ===
In April 2008, Hot Rod magazine released an article claiming that American Motors was in the process of being revived. The vehicles in the works were to be the AMX, Matador, Ambassador, Pacer, and Gremlin. It was a popular article, illustrated with drawings of the concept cars entering production and accompanied by plentiful information. However, it was later revealed as an April Fools' joke.

== See also ==
- Amitron and Electron – Experimental battery-powered city cars designed by American Motors.
- AMC and Jeep transmissions
- AMC 20
- Amco, American Motors, Inc. of New York City, active from 1917 until 1922.

== Bibliography ==
- Lutz, Robert A. (1999). Guts: The Seven Laws of Business That Made Chrysler the World's Hottest Car Company. John Wiley & Sons. ISBN 978-0-471-35765-0.
- Mays, James C. (2006). The Savvy Guide to Buying Collector Cars at Auction. Indy-Tech Publishing. ISBN 978-0-7906-1322-2.
