= Jeep Comanche =

Pickup truck variant, produced 1986–1992

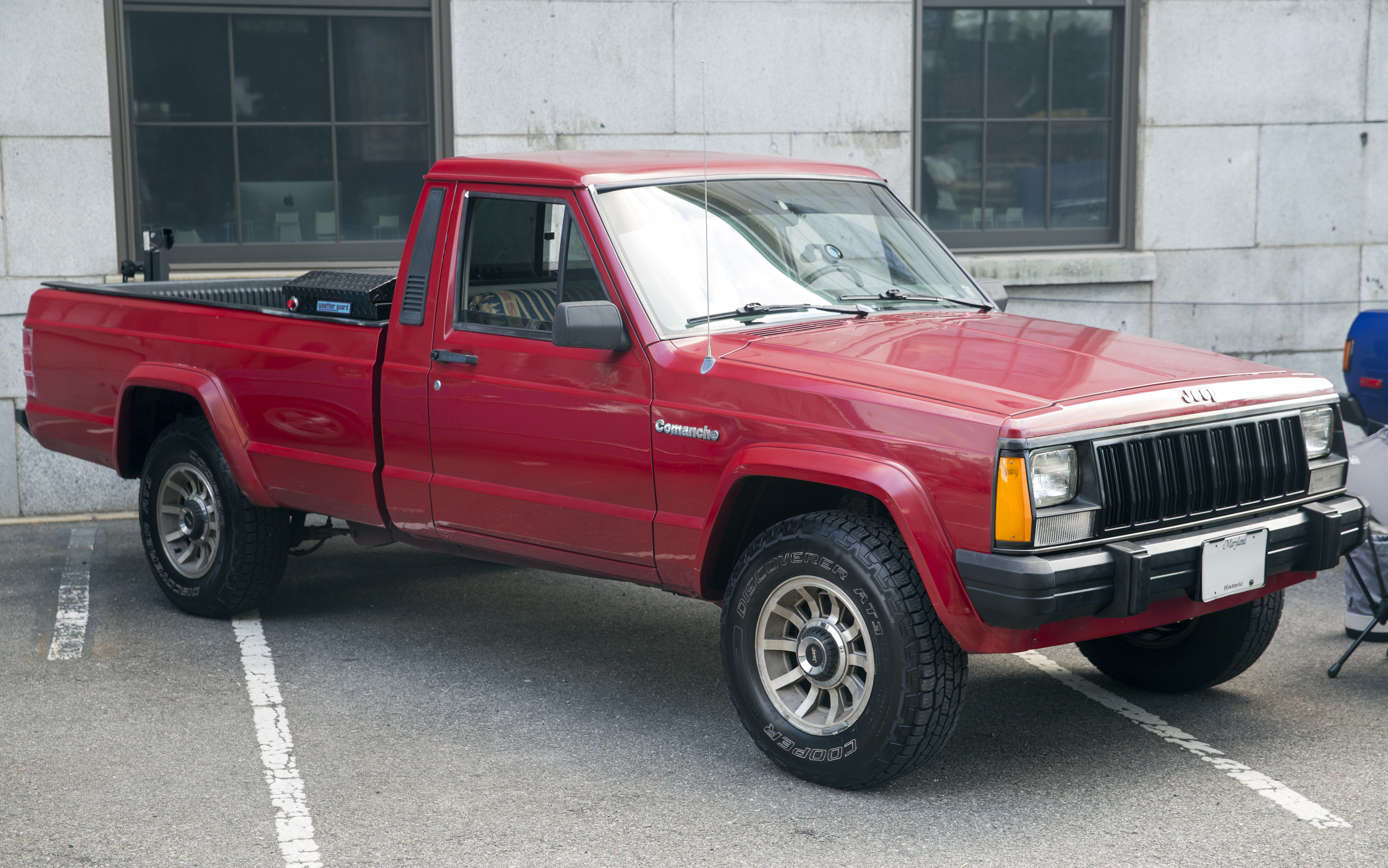

Overview
- Manufacturer: Jeep (Note: American Motors (1985–1988); Chrysler Corporation (1988–1992))
- Production: 1985–1992
- Model years: 1986–1992

Body and chassis
- Class: Compact pickup truck
- Body style: 2-door truck
- Layout: Front engine, rear-wheel and four-wheel drive
- Related: Jeep Cherokee

Powertrain
- Engine: gasoline: 2.5 L AMC 150 I4; 2.8 L GM LR2 V6; 4.0 L AMC 242 I6; diesel: 2.1 L Renault J8S turbo I4
- Transmission: 4-speed Aisin AX-4 manual 5-speed Aisin AX-5 manual 5-speed Peugeot BA-10/5 manual 5-speed Aisin AX-15 manual 3-speed A904 automatic 4-speed Aisin AW-4 automatic

Dimensions
- Wheelbase: 113 in (2,870 mm) (6' bed); 119.9 in (3,045 mm) (7' bed)
- Length: 179.2 in (4,552 mm) (6' bed); 194.0 in (4,928 mm) (7' bed)
- Width: 71.7 in (1,821 mm)
- Height: 64.7 in (1,643 mm)

Chronology
- Predecessor: Jeep CJ-8 (Scrambler); Jeep CJ-10; Jeep Gladiator (SJ)
- Successor: Jeep Gladiator (JT)

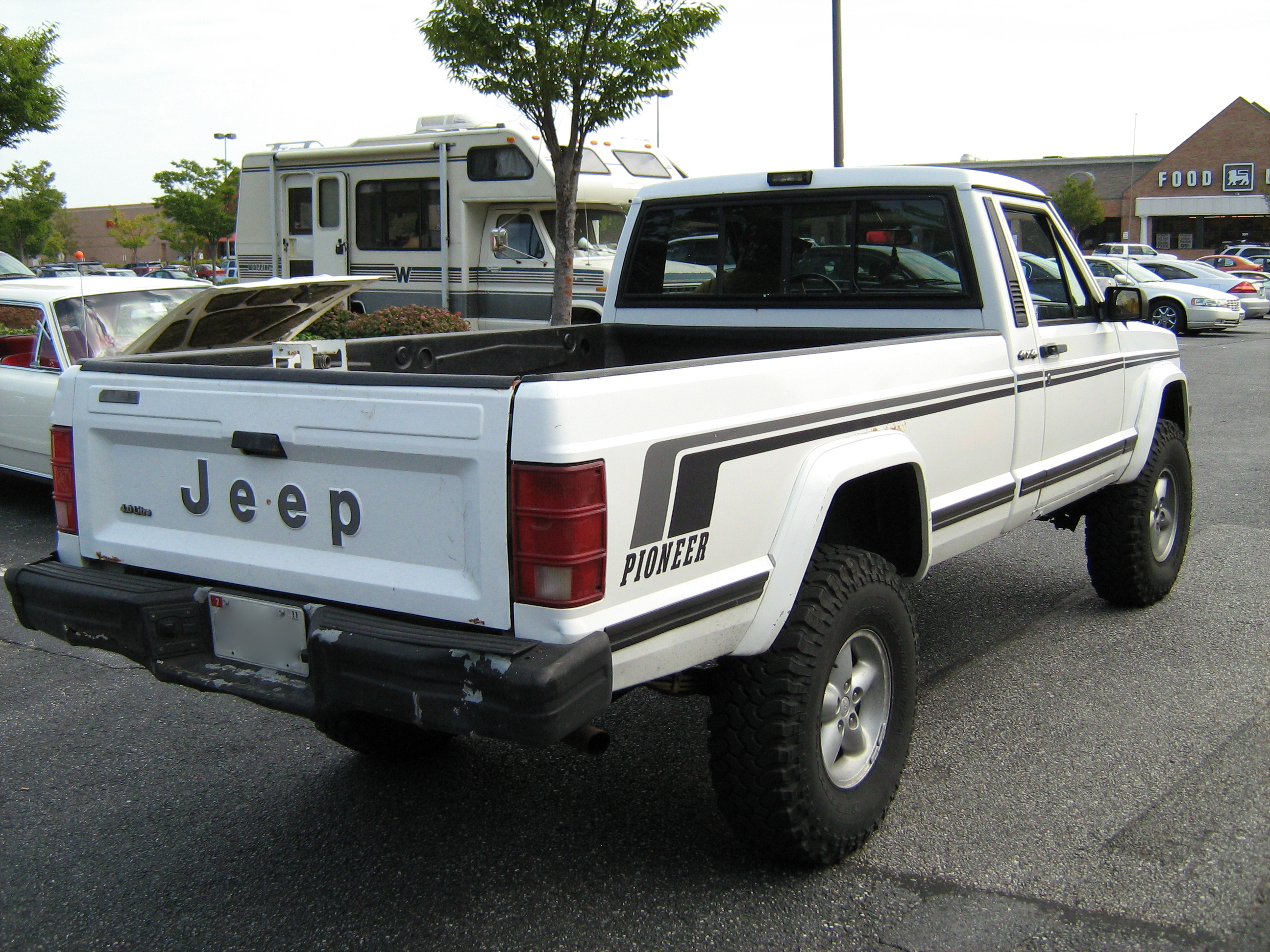
Jeep Comanche Pioneer

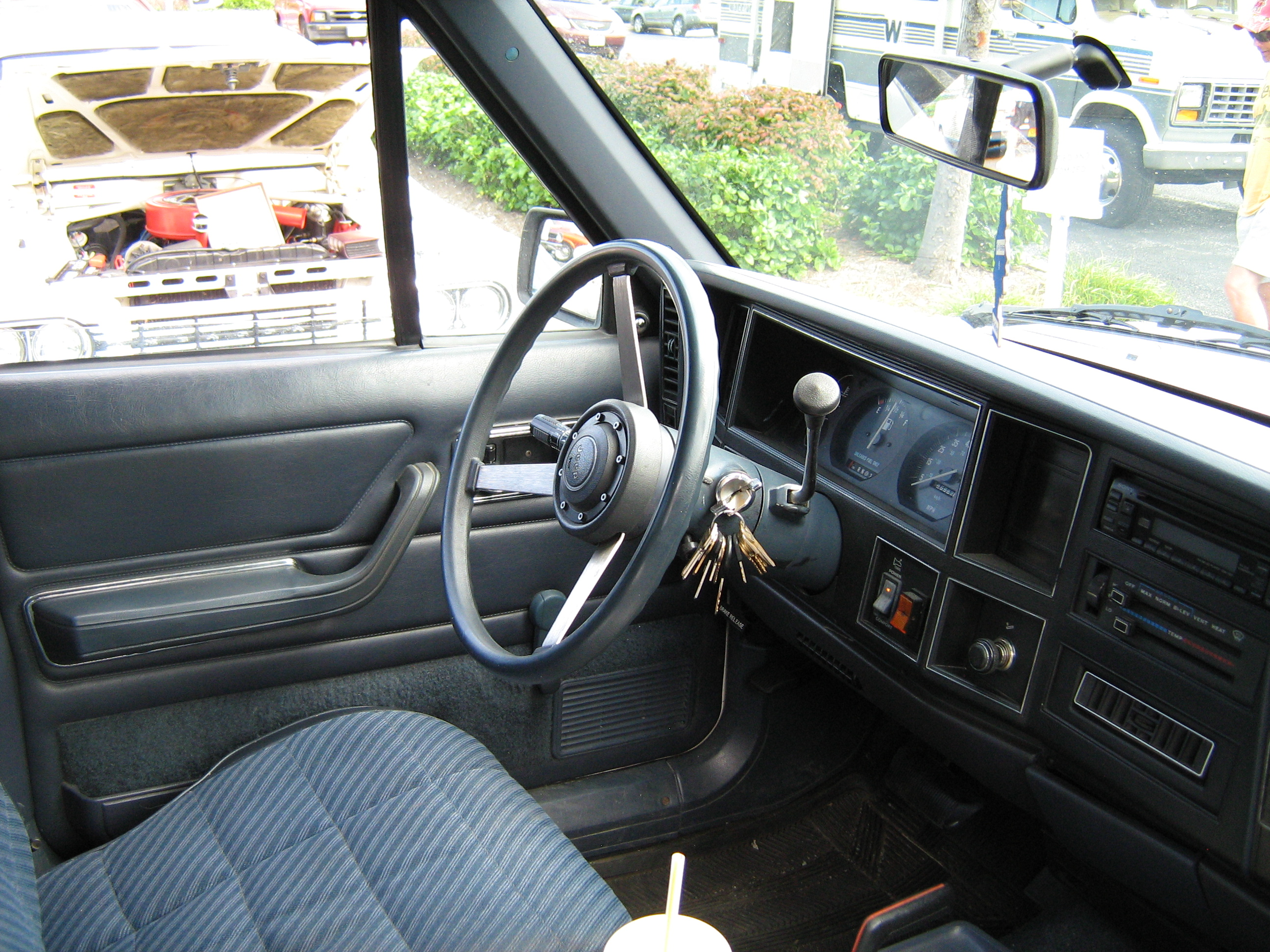
Jeep Comanche Pioneer interior

The Jeep Comanche (designated MJ) is a compact pickup truck variant of the Cherokee compact SUV (1984–2001) manufactured and marketed by Jeep from 1986 to 1992 in rear wheel (RWD) and four-wheel drive (4WD) models as well as two cargo bed lengths: six-foot (1.83 meters) and seven-foot (2.13 meters).

== Introduction ==
During the mid-1980s, according to AMC chairman W. Paul Tippett Jr. "People are finding trucks a reasonable and sophisticated alternative to cars." To satisfy the demand and to compete with Japanese competitors, both AMC and Chrysler were preparing compact pickups for the 1986 and 1987 model years (respectively). Also at this time the financial health of AMC was poor and the automaker needed cash as it was preparing a new line of midsize sedans (the Eagle Premier) scheduled to be produced at a factory being built in Canada (Brampton Assembly), but the best thing the company had going for it was its popular line of Jeeps and introducing a compact Jeep pickup truck in the fall of 1985 was expected to help.

The Jeep Comanche was introduced in mid-August 1985, at a lavish event staged at the ballroom of the MGM Grand Hotel and Casino (currently Bally's Las Vegas) for AMC's over 1,500 North American dealers. American Motors included Chinese officials as part of the negotiations establishing Beijing Jeep (now Beijing Benz). The goal was to produce and sell Comanches in China through this joint venture.

The new trucks were unveiled by Jose Dedeurwaerder, an engineer and international business executive with 23 years of experience with Renault, who had just been appointed as AMC's new president. The base price of the two-wheel drive model was $7,049 (adjusted only for inflation equal to US$21,101 in 2025 dollars), making it the lowest priced Jeep model for the 1986 model year.

== Design ==
American Motors' Jeep designers based the Comanche MJ body, styling, engineering, and powertrain on the XJ Cherokee, which had been introduced for the 1984 model year. The Comanche had a somewhat more conventional body-on-frame design behind the cab and a removable cargo box, but retained the unibody construction of the Cherokee in the front half of the vehicle.

Two cargo bed lengths were used; one for the seven-foot long-bed model, which appeared first in 1986, and a second, shorter version for the six-foot cargo bed, which debuted for the 1987 model year. Unlike other pickups of the time that used C-channel frames, the Comanche's frame design (called a "Uniframe" by Jeep) under the cargo bed was fully boxed, with a large X structure centered over the rear axle. For strength, the rails were over eight inches deep (top to bottom), much deeper than conventional midsize truck frames (1983 Jeep J-10 full-size truck frame is 6.75 inches at the deepest point). This structure was pioneered by AMC for the 1971 "Cowboy" compact pickup prototype.

From 1986 to 1987, the Jeep Comanche grille had ten slots in a similar configuration to the 1984-1987 Cherokee XJ, while from 1988 to 1992, this configuration changed to eight slots to match with the SUV. A new "4x4" badge, similar to those found on the Cherokee and Wagoneer models, was affixed to the upper rear of the cargo box on all the four-wheel drive models.

After the Chrysler buyout of American Motors for $1.5 billion on March 9, 1987, designed to capture "the highly profitable Jeep vehicles ... and 1,400 additional dealers", the Jeep Comanche, like the similar Cherokee, received only minor changes. These were primarily to improve reliability and parts interchangeability with other Chrysler-built vehicles.

== Suspension ==
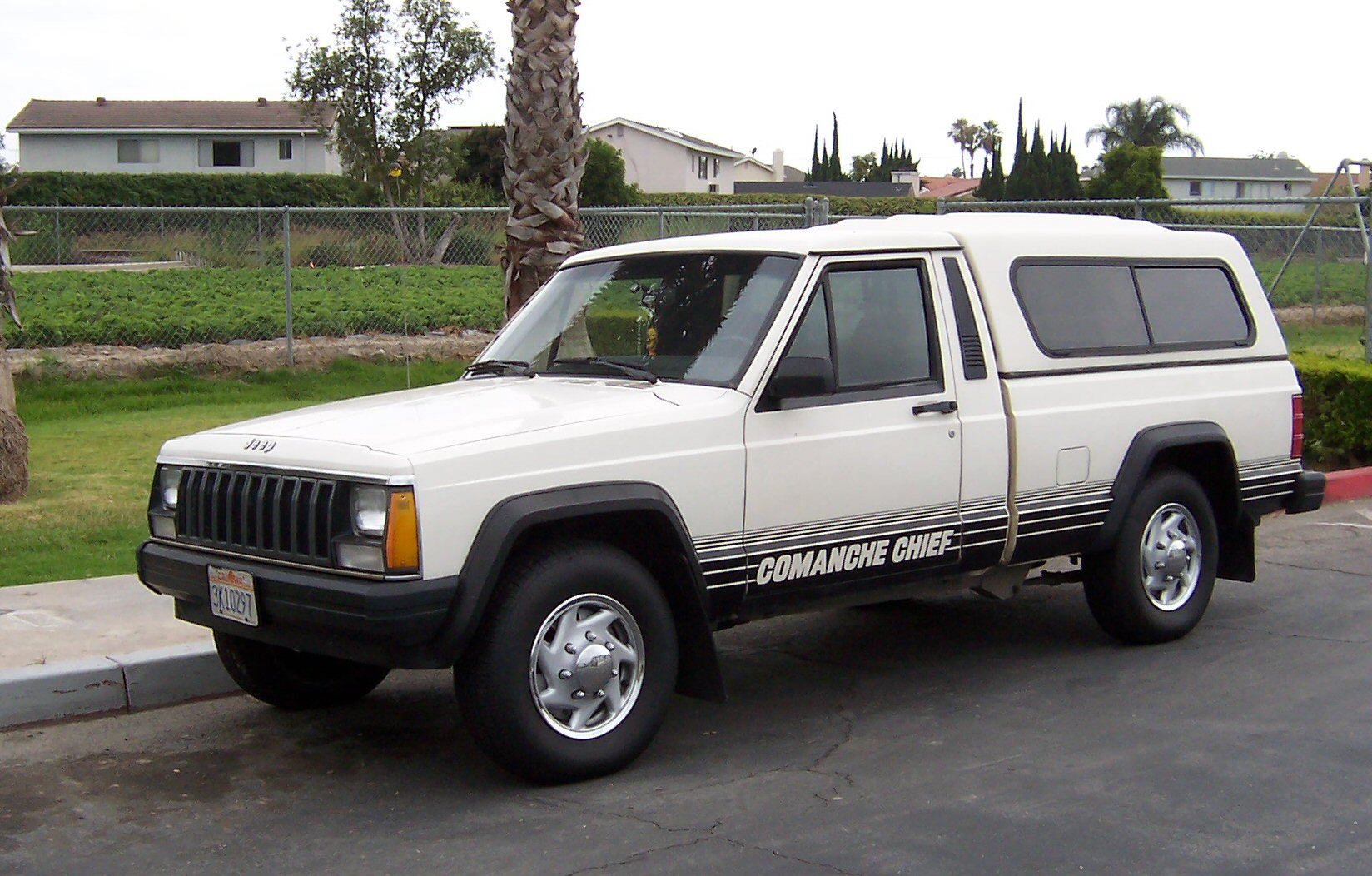
Jeep Comanche Chief with aftermarket modifications

The Comanche used the XJ Cherokee's "Quadralink" front suspension, with coil springs and upper/lower control arms on a solid axle. It was argued that the coil springs allowed for greater ride comfort and axle articulation during off-road excursions. A track bar (Panhard rod) is used to keep the axle centered under the truck. Modified versions of this same basic suspension system were later used on the 1993–2004 Grand Cherokee, 1997 and newer TJ Wranglers, and 1994 and newer Dodge Rams.

For the rear suspension, the truck used leaf springs that are considerably longer than the Cherokee's, which give Comanches good load-carrying capacity without creating a hard ride. The standard rear axle was the same Dana 35 used in the Cherokee, except that the Comanche mounted the leaf springs underneath the axle, as do most other trucks, and the Cherokee mounted them on top of the axle. There was also a heavy-duty Metric Ton package for the long-bed models. The package included heavier-duty leaf springs and wheels, larger tires, and upgraded the rear axle to a Dana 44, which increased the stock payload (cargo) capacity from 1,400 to 2,205 pounds (635 to 1,000 kg), well above that of any other mid-size truck. The Metric Ton Comanche's payload rating was higher than that of many full-size pickups.

== Powertrain ==
The inaugural 1986 model year Comanches could be equipped with one of three engines: AMC's 2.5 L four-cylinder as standard, with General Motors' 2.8 L V6 or Renault's 2.1 L I4 turbo diesel available as options. In base trim, the four-cylinder engine was backed by a four-speed manual transmission, with either a five-speed manual or three-speed TorqueFlite A904 automatic built by Chrysler as an option. The V6 engine was available with either the five-speed manual or the automatic, while the turbodiesel was only available with the five-speed.

The V6 was the same engine used in the competing Chevrolet S-10, and equipped with a two-barrel Rochester carburetor instead of the four-cylinder's electronic throttle-body fuel injection system. The optional six-cylinder was slightly less powerful than the standard four. The V6 thus offered little performance advantage over the base engine while penalizing the owner with poorer fuel economy. In the truck's second year on the market, the V6 was replaced by AMC's new fuel-injected 4.0 L straight-six that developed 173 hp (129 kW; 175 PS) and 220 lb⋅ft (298 N⋅m): 50% more power and 47% more torque than the previous V6. The new six-cylinder was also more fuel-efficient. The performance of the base 2.5 L engine was also improved with a new air intake, raising peak output to 121 hp and 141 lb⋅ft. The slow-selling turbodiesel option was dropped during the model year.

Concurrent with the introduction of the new straight-six, a new four-speed automatic built by Aisin-Warner replaced the former Chrysler three-speed. The 30-40LE featured electronic controls with a switch on the dashboard allowing the driver to choose between two performance modes: "Power", in which the transmission downshifts more quickly and upshifts at higher rpm during hard acceleration, and "Comfort", in which the upshifts are made at lower engine speeds to conserve fuel and reduce engine noise and vibration.

In 1988 output of the 4.0 L engine was improved slightly to 177 hp and 224 lb⋅ft.

Chrysler purchased AMC in 1987, and by the 1991 model year, adapted their own engine control electronics to replace the original Renix systems used with the 2.5 L and 4.0 L engines. Power and torque in both engines improved as a result, with the four-cylinder having an additional 9 hp and 8 lb⋅ft and the six-cylinder improving by 1 lb⋅ft and 13 hp. The 4.0 L was badged "High Output" thereafter. As a result of the power improvements, the Aisin-Warner automatic transmission's output shaft was changed from 21 splines to 23, and the "Power-Comfort" switch was deleted. The four-cylinder was no longer available with the automatic in 1991 and 1992.

During the production life of the Comanche, six different transmissions were offered, manufactured by Aisin, Chrysler, and Peugeot. Chrysler provided the aforementioned TorqueFlite 904 three-speed automatic in 1986 models. In addition to the aforementioned 30-40LE four-speed automatic Aisin also provided the AX-4 (four-speed), AX-5, and AX-15 (five-speed overdrive) manual transmissions. The AX-15 was phased in midway through the 1989 model year to replace the Peugeot BA10/5 five-speed that had been used behind the 4.0 L engine from its introduction in 1987.

Comanches were available in either two or four-wheel-drive, with solid axles front and rear (two-wheel-drive Comanches used a simple beam axle with otherwise the same front suspension as four-wheel-drive models). Transfer cases were built by New Process Gear, and the Comanche was available with either part-time "Command-Trac" or full-time "Selec-Trac" systems. In 1986, Command-Trac transfer cases were model NP207, and Selec-Trac were NP228, both with a 2.61:1 low gear ratios. In 1987, the NP207 was replaced with the NP231, and the NP228 was replaced with the NP242, both with 2.72:1 low gears. These remained the same through the rest of the Comanche's production.

=== Engines ===
Name	Displacement	Layout	Fuel	Power	Torque	Notes	Years
2.5 Litre	2464 cc (150 CID)	I4, OHV	Gasoline	117 hp (87 kW) at 5,000 rpm	135 lb⋅ft (183 N⋅m) at 3,250 rpm	Renix TBI	1986
2.5 Litre	2464 cc (150 CID)	I4, OHV	Gasoline	121 hp (90 kW) at 5,000 rpm	141 lb⋅ft (191 N⋅m) at 3,500 rpm	Renix TBI	1987–1990
2.5 Litre	2464 cc (150 CID)	I4, OHV	Gasoline	130 hp (97 kW) at 5,250 rpm	149 lb⋅ft (202 N⋅m) at 3,250 rpm	Chrysler MPI	1991–1992
2.8 L V6	2838 cc (173 CID)	V6, OHV	Gasoline	115 hp (86 kW) at 4,800 rpm	150 lb⋅ft (200 N⋅m) at 2,100 rpm	Chevrolet LR2	1986
2.1 L TurboDiesel	2068 cc (126 CID)	I4, SOHC	Diesel	85 hp (63 kW) at 3,750 rpm	132 lb⋅ft (179 N⋅m) at 2,750 rpm	Renault J8S	1986–1987
4.0 Litre	3964 cc (242 CID)	I6, OHV	Gasoline	173 hp (129 kW) at 4,500 rpm	220 lb⋅ft (300 N⋅m) at 2,500 rpm	Renix MPI	1987
4.0 Litre	3964 cc (242 CID)	I6, OHV	Gasoline	177 hp (132 kW) at 4,500 rpm	224 lb⋅ft (304 N⋅m) at 2,500 rpm	Renix MPI	1988–1990
4.0 Litre	3964 cc (242 CID)	I6, OHV	Gasoline	190 hp (142 kW) at 4,750 rpm	225 lb⋅ft (305 N⋅m) at 3,950 rpm	Chrysler MPI, "High Output"	1991–1992

=== Transmissions ===
Name	Type	Engine	Years
Aisin AX-4	Manual, 4-speed	2.5 Litre	1986–1992
Aisin AX-5	Manual, 5-speed	2.5 Litre	1986–1992
Aisin AX-5	Manual, 5-speed	2.8 L V6	1986
Aisin AX-5	Manual, 5-speed	2.1 L TurboDiesel	1986–1987
TorqueFlite A904	Automatic, 3-speed	2.5 Litre	1986
TorqueFlite A904	Automatic, 3-speed	2.8 L V6	1986
Aisin-Warner 30-40LE (AW-4)	Automatic, 4-speed	2.5 Litre	1987–1990
Aisin-Warner 30-40LE (AW-4)	Automatic, 4-speed	4.0 Litre	1987–1992
Peugeot BA10/5	Manual, 5-speed	4.0 Litre	1987–1989 (March 9)
Aisin AX-15	Manual, 5-speed	4.0 Litre	1989 (March 10) –1992

== Trims ==
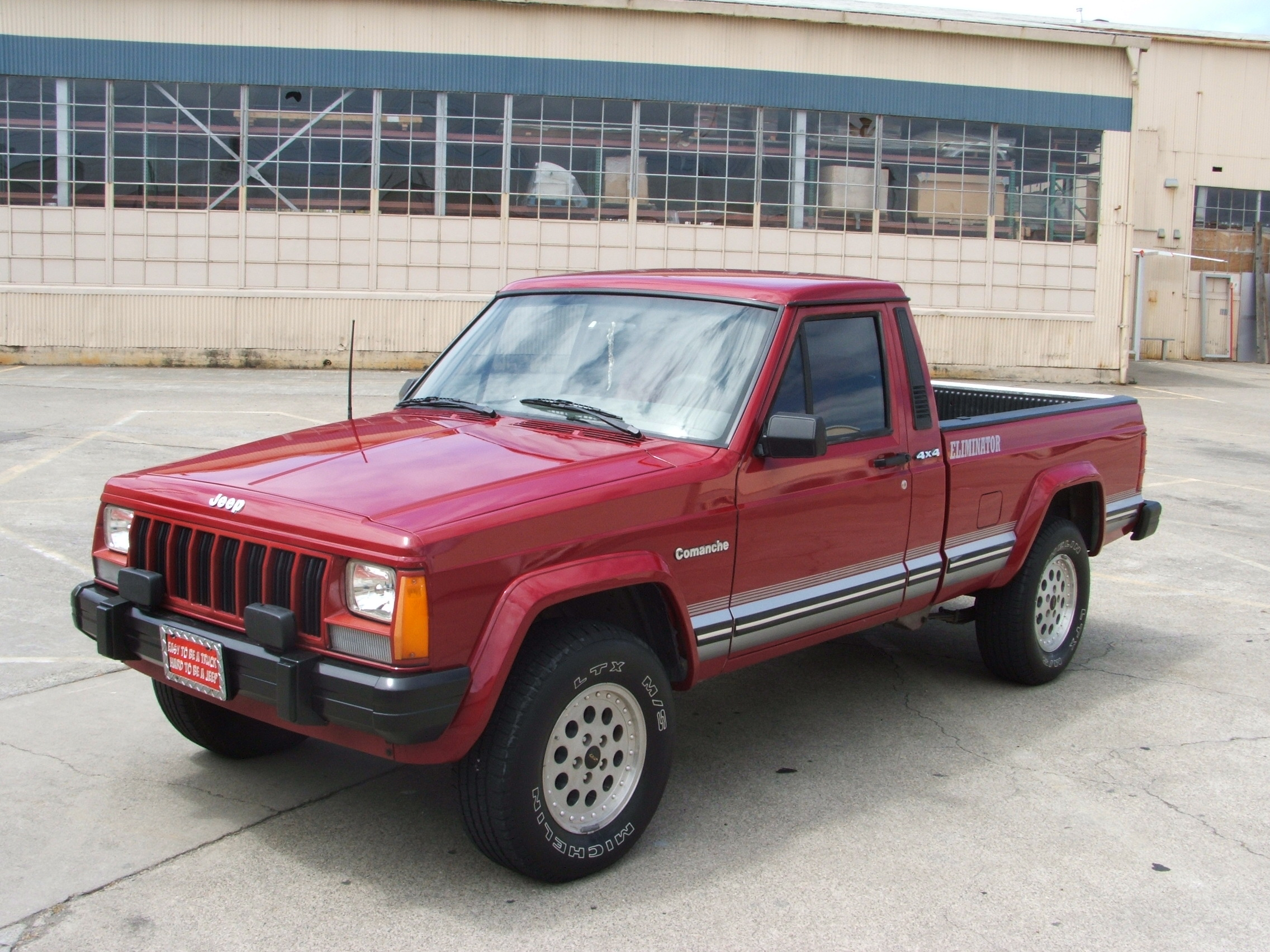
1990 Jeep Comanche Eliminator

By model year availability:

- 1986 - Custom - The most basic Comanche trim that could be ordered.
- 1986 - X - One of the more "basic" trims of the Comanche.
- 1986 - XLS - A "step-up" version of the more "basic" Comanche trims.
- 1987-1992 - Base (SporTruck) - Became the most basic trim of the Comanche after 1986.
- 1988- Olympic Edition - Based on the Pioneer trim to commemorate the 1988 Summer Olympics and Team U.S.A. .
- 1987-1988 - Chief - Added more standard equipment to the base-level Comanche trims.
- 1987-1990 - Laredo - The top-of-the-line and most "up-level" trim on the Comanche.
- 1987-1992 - Pioneer - A "step-up" version of the base Comanche trim.
- 1988-1992 - Eliminator - The "sporty" Comanche trim.

== Phaseout and aborted name revival ==
The decision to phase out the Jeep Comanche "came from a combination of two factors— low sales and Chrysler's attempts to make the Jeep brand fit into the Chrysler hierarchy of Plymouth, Dodge, and Chrysler models" with Jeep housing SUVs and Dodge making trucks.

As sales dropped, the Comanche was planned for discontinuation. In 1990, the National Council of Jeep-Eagle dealers asked Chrysler to discontinue the Comanche, and allow them to sell a version of the Dodge Dakota pickup.

The company decided to cease production of the Comanche on June 12, 1992, after only a few thousand more trucks rolled off the Toledo, Ohio, assembly line. A total of 190,446 Comanches were made during their production run.

Following the discontinuation of the Comanche, the Dodge Ramcharger would be dropped outside of Mexico shortly afterwards as part of Chrysler's plans to have Dodge sell pickup trucks and Jeep sell SUVs. Despite that, Dodge would later re-enter the SUV field with the Dodge Durango in 1998 at the height of the initial SUV boom and at one point would offer three SUVs or crossovers (Durango, Journey and Nitro, the latter being a rebadged version of the Jeep Liberty (KK)) while Jeep didn't offer any pickup trucks. Dodge itself would stop offering pickup trucks in 2011 when the Ram Trucks brand was spun off from Dodge, taking the Dodge Ram and Dakota with it.

Jeep re-entered the pickup truck market in early 2019 with the Wrangler-based Jeep Gladiator. Jeep actually considered reviving the Comanche name alongside Gladiator and most commonly Scrambler, as well as simply using a new name, before deciding on Gladiator, feeling it fits that truck the best; sensitivity to the Native Americans (specifically the Comanche tribe) and much less brand recognition compared to Jeep's decades-long use of "Cherokee" for the Jeep Cherokee and Grand Cherokee also likely played factors. The new Gladiator will serve as a 27-year-later replacement for the Comanche in Jeep's pickup truck line.

Production numbers (these numbers are per Calendar year, not Model year):

Year	Numbers
1985	29,245
1986	33,386
1987	43,070
1988	43,718
1989	25,311
1990	9,576
1991	5,188
1992	952
