= Jeep-Eagle =

Division of Chrysler

- Type: Division
- Industry: Automotive
- Predecessor: American Motors
- Founded: 1987
- Defunct: 1997; 29 years ago
- Headquarters: Detroit, U.S.
- Key people: Joseph E. Cappy
- Products: Automobiles
- Brands: Jeep; Eagle
- Parent: Chrysler

Jeep-Eagle was the name of the automobile sales division created by the Chrysler Corporation after the US$2 billion takeover of American Motors Corporation (AMC) in 1987. The division marketed a variety of vehicles until 1997.

The division focused on the commercialisation of Jeep and Eagle brands of vehicles.

== History ==
The formation of the Jeep-Eagle Division in 1987 represented a strategic change in American automotive history. This involved organizing the assets, products, and operations of American Motors Corporation (AMC) following its acquisition by Chrysler Corporation. The Jeep-Eagle division was a strategic move by Chrysler designed to integrate AMC's valuable assets, primarily the highly successful Jeep brand, into its extensive corporate structure while steering through regulatory and market realities.

The first group vice president was Joseph E. Cappy, who previously held the post of AMC president and chief executive officer. Cappy's leadership was instrumental in overseeing the absorption and restructuring of AMC's legacy. The core responsibilities of the Jeep-Eagle Division were multifaceted: it was tasked with the continued promotion, sales, and product engineering for the popular Jeep line, rebranded models under the Eagle marque, and the remaining four-wheel-drive AMC Eagle. This integration was a method to bring nearly 1,200 AMC dealers into Chrysler's expansive distribution network, simultaneously requiring them to "meet stronger quality standards" set by the new corporate owner.

Creating the Jeep-Eagle Division was a direct response to prevailing state franchise laws that presented a significant hurdle to a seamless merger because guaranteed automobile dealership profitability and survival at the expense of efficiency and profits for the automakers. These laws effectively prevented Chrysler from folding the AMC dealer network into its already established Chrysler-Plymouth or Dodge franchise systems. Similarly, these state laws prohibited the sale of existing Chrysler-branded products through the newly acquired AMC dealerships. Consequently, the new Jeep-Eagle Division provided Chrysler with a distinct, third dealer organization, allowing it to preserve the unique identity and distribution channels of the Jeep and Eagle brands while gradually integrating them into its overall sales strategy. This complex maneuver allowed Chrysler to strategically expand its market reach, particularly in the burgeoning SUV segment dominated by Jeep, without immediately disrupting its existing dealer relationships or running afoul of franchise regulations.

Over time, Chrysler terminated or renegotiated the franchise agreements with each former AMC dealership, ultimately discontinued the Eagle brand, and integrated the remaining dealers into Chrysler's distribution system.

=== Eagle ===
Upon completion of the merger, Chrysler rebranded the Renault Medallion under the Eagle marque and discontinued the Renault Alliance, Encore, and GTA models. AMC's dealers continued to market and service the popular Jeep light-truck brand. They also were responsible for selling the new Eagle Premier, which Renault and AMC had been working on since 1982 and were originally planning on releasing in 1987 before the merger. The four-door sedan was manufactured at the new AMC plant in Canada from September 1987 (for the 1988 model year) until December 1991 (for the 1992 model year). Upon its release, the Eagle Premier was described as "a world-class car" by automotive journalists and was praised for its "... incredible 122 cubic feet of interior room..." along with "European handling." A review in the October 1987 issue of Popular Mechanics magazine praised its "...state-of-the-art electronics..."

The newly established Jeep-Eagle Division business strategy was to increase Jeep production and focus more money on marketing. From 1988, the new "Eagle marketing umbrella" also marketed versions of vehicles produced by Diamond-Star Motors.

Chrysler hoped to make Jeep-Eagle their "specialty division," selling products distinctly different from the K-car-based products. The Eagle passenger cars were supposed to try to capture import buyers. However, they evolved from the innovative, full-sized Premier and the imported mid-sized Medallion into a hodgepodge of cars developed between Chrysler and Mitsubishi.

The Eagle Summit, a rebadged second-generation Mitsubishi Mirage, joined the Dodge Colt and Plymouth Colt starting in 1989 as Chrysler wound down the assembly of its subcompact Plymouth Horizon and Dodge Omni twins and to replace the Renault Alliance discontinued in 1987. In Canada the Summit range were sold as the Eagle Vista. The Eagle Summit line continued through the extent of the Mirage's fourth generation, which ended in 1996.

Using their own designs and the AMC/Renault Eagle Premier platform, Chrysler released the Eagle Vision and almost-identical (first-generation) Chrysler Concorde in 1992. The Vision was built until 1997 and was exported to Europe as the Chrysler Vision. The sedan model earned itself Automobile Magazine's Automobile of the Year in 1993. The Vision ultimately became the only Eagle-brand model to be wholly designed and built in-house by Chrysler.

Chrysler made a good-faith effort to give the Eagle brand an identity by offering an all wheel drive (AWD) Eagle Talon, basically a badge engineered Mitsubishi Eclipse AWD, however sales were hindered by marketing missteps.

=== Jeep ===
The Jeep half of the division, however, remained the better-known and more popular brand. Chrysler latched on to the Jeep heritage and advertisements featured Lee Iacocca assured that after Chrysler took over AMC, that "we won't fool around with an American institution. Jeep will stay Jeep. That's a promise." Many of the long-established AMC/Jeep dealers considered the new Eagle line of passenger cars to be less profitable than their Jeep business. American Motors had phased out domestic-built rear-wheel-drive passenger cars after 1983 and their Japanese front-wheel-drive imports did not achieve sales successes. Thus, AMC/Jeep dealer sales and service expertise was focused on the four-wheel drive Jeeps and AMC's Eagle AWD models.

Chrysler marketed the SJ Jeep Grand Wagoneer until 1991, leaving it almost entirely unaltered from the final American Motors rendition before the buyout. The Jeep Comanche pickup truck remained until 1992, the Jeep Wrangler (YJ) was produced until 1995, while the Jeep Cherokee (XJ) remained until 2001 in the United States. Although it was not introduced until 1993, the Jeep Grand Cherokee was initially an American Motors-developed vehicle. Subsequent Jeep models were designed, engineered and built by Chrysler for Jeep-Eagle until Chrysler's acquisition by Daimler-Benz in 1998.

=== End of the brand ===
The objective of the Eagle Division was to target consumers that "are young, independent-minded, educated and affluent-baby boomers and their younger brothers and sisters, Generation X." However, Eagle customers purchased similar Dodge, Plymouth, or Chrysler vehicles; thus, according to the automaker, the decline in Eagle models no longer justified the investment required to maintaining the brand. Although Chrysler had planned to redesign the Eagle Vision for 1999, production continued only into September 1997. The model was later marketed as the Chrysler 300M as the decision to drop the Eagle brand was already made.

Jeep became a stand-alone division when the Eagle brand was retired shortly after Chrysler's merger with Daimler-Benz in 1998, and efforts were made to merge the Chrysler and Jeep brands as one sales unit. Dealers with only the Chrysler franchise did not have a sport utility vehicle (SUV) to sell. Incorporating the Jeep line allowed them to compete in this popular market segment. While adding Jeep vehicles to Chrysler cars helped individual dealerships, it also eliminated the need to continue the Eagle brand.

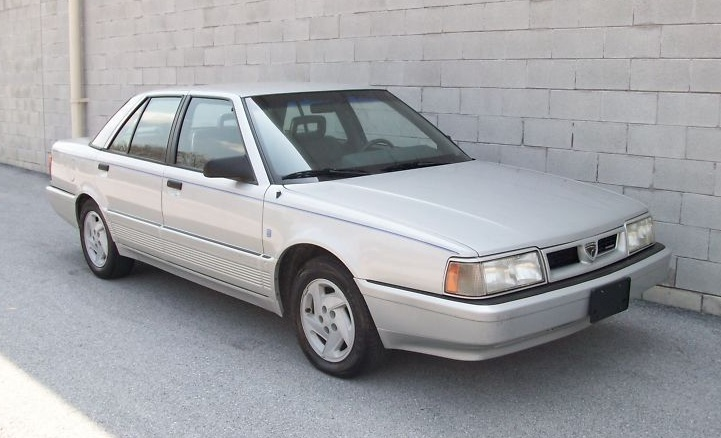
1992 Eagle Premier ES Limited

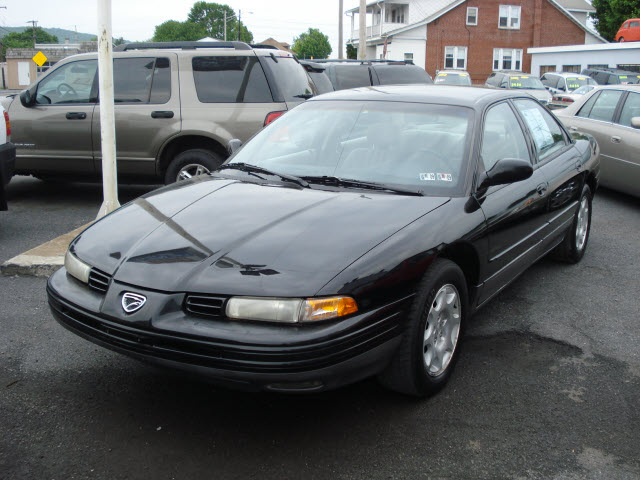
1995 Eagle Vision TSi sedan

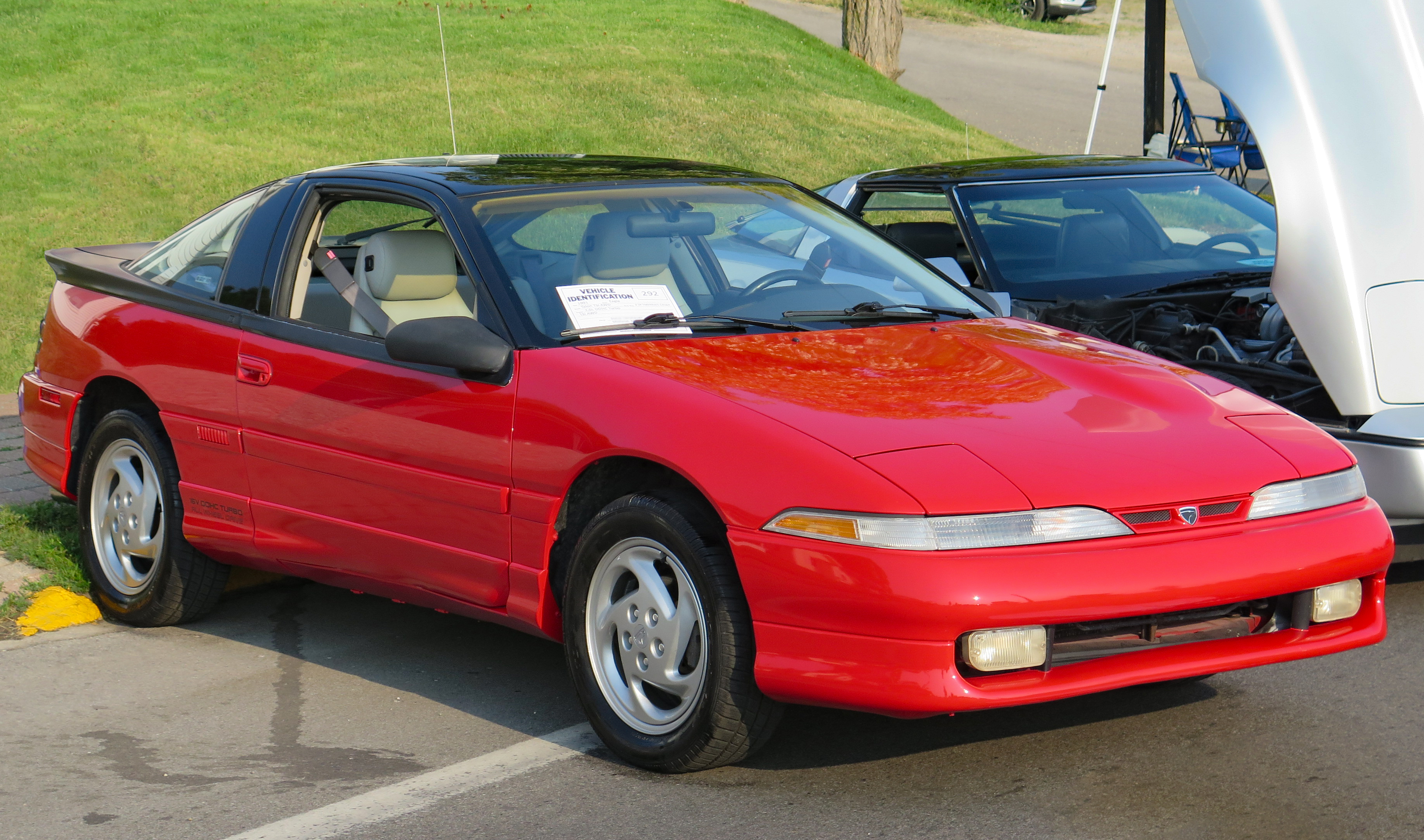
1991 Eagle Talon (Mitsubishi Eclipse)

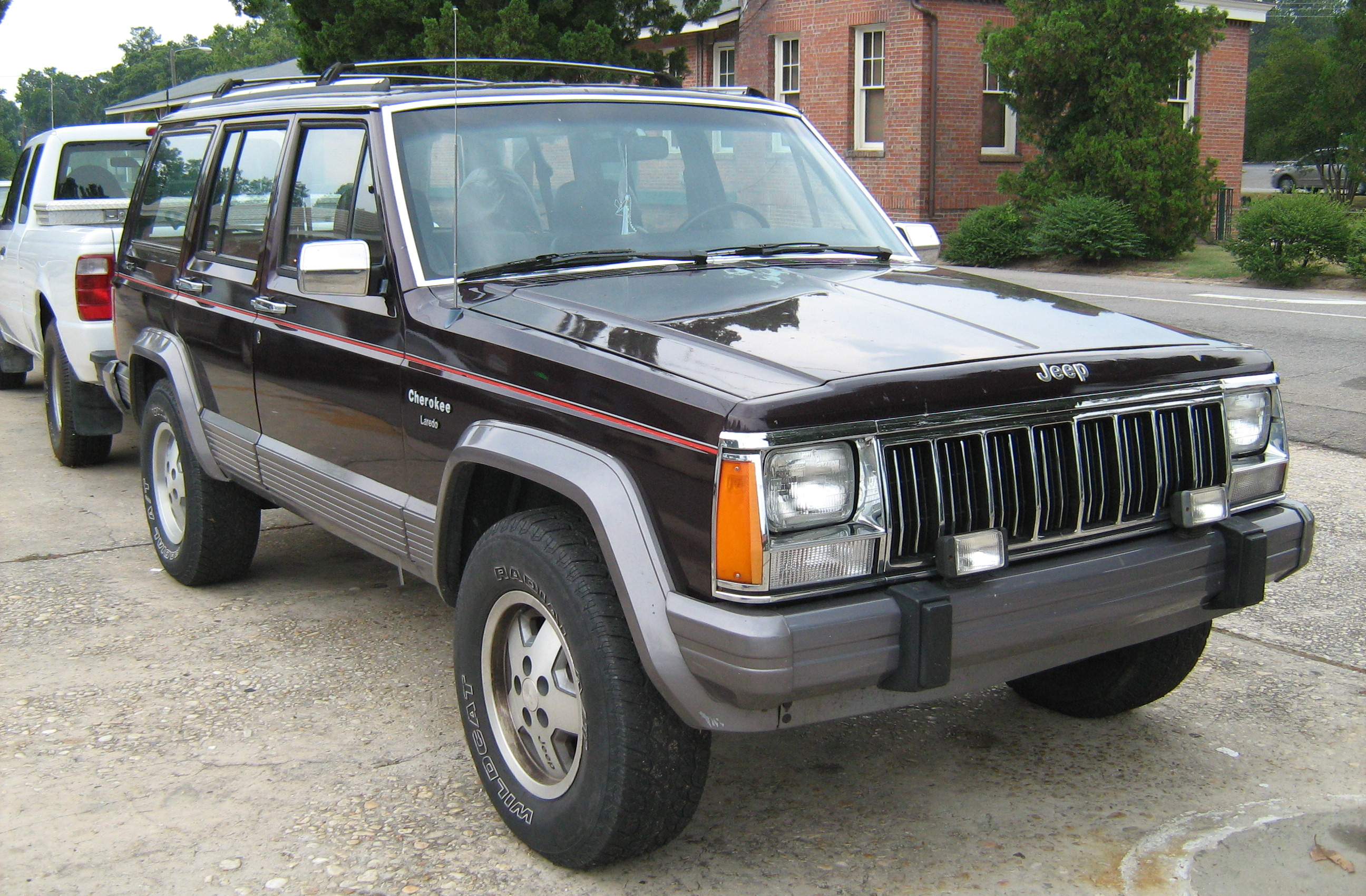
1992 Jeep Cherokee XJ Laredo
