= Jose Dedeurwaerder =

Belgian businessman (1932–2023)

- Born: Jose Joseph Dedeurwaerder; 31 December 1932; Brussels, Belgium
- Died: 11 November 2023 (aged 90); Córdoba, Argentina
- Occupation: CEO of American Motors and Interbrew
- Years active: 1958–1995
- Spouse: Nelly Antoinette Clemens (m. 1959; death 2006)
- Children: 1

Jose Joseph Dedeurwaerder (31 December 1932 – 11 November 2023) was a Belgian business executive who was chief executive officer of American Motors Corporation and Interbrew.

== Background ==
Dedeurwaerder was born in Brussels on 31 December 1932, to Louis and Philippine (Paternot) Dedeurwaerder. On May 15, 1954, he married Nelly Antoinette Clemens. They had one daughter.

== Career ==
=== Renault ===
Dedeurwaerder joined Renault in 1958 as manufacturing director at the Vilvoorde Renault Factory. From 1967 to 1973, he was the industrial director for Renault Argentina. He then spent the next three years as the chief executive officer of Renault México. In 1976, he became the director of stamping and assembly at the Douai Renault Factory.

=== American Motors ===
On 16 December 1980, Renault became the principal owner of American Motors. The following September, Dedeurwaerder joined AMC as executive vice president for manufacturing. In 1982, Gerald C. Meyers stepped down as chairman and CEO of American Motors. Meyers was replaced by president W. Paul Tippett Jr., who in turn was succeeded by Dedeurwaerder. On 28 September 1984, Dedeurwaerder was promoted to CEO, with Tippett remaining on as chairman. On 25 February 1985, AMC announced its first full-year profit since 1979. The success was short-lived as on July 31, 1985, AMC announced that it has received a $50 million loan from Renault following a second-quarter loss of $70.4 million. In January 1986, Dedeurwaerder was named Renault's executive vice president of worldwide sales and marketing. He remained president and CEO, and chairman of the executive committee at AMC until March 23, 1986, when he was succeeded in the former two roles by Joseph E. Cappy. On 17 November 1986, Renault chairman Georges Besse was assassinated by a member of a French far-left extremist group, Action Directe. Dedeurwaerder was mentioned as a possible successor, but the company instead went with Raymond Levy, who wanted to divest Renault of its investment in American Motors. On 9 March 1987, Chrysler purchased Renault's share in American Motors, plus all the remaining shares, for about $1.5 billion ($4,250,878,735 in 2025 dollars).

=== Interbrew ===
Dedeurwaerder left Renault in January 1988. That September, he joined the of executive committee Interbrew, a new brewing company formed by the merger of Brouwerij Artois and Piedboeuf Brewery, with the plan that he would succeed chief executive officer Andre de Spoelberch by the end of the year. During his tenure with Interbrew, Dedeurwaerder clashed with the families who owned the company over international expansion. Dedeurwaerder wanted to make acquisitions that would turn the company into a global player like Heineken N.V. or Guinness Brewery. In contrast, the board of directors wanted to focus on Interbrew's existing markets. Dedeurwaerder left Interbrew in February 1993.

== Later life and death ==
After leaving Interbrew, Dedeurwaerder moved to a 130-acre horse ranch in Montgomery, Texas. From 1993 to 1995, he was the president of Modern Engineering – an automotive engineering firm owned by CDI Corporation.

Dedeurwaerder died in Córdoba, Argentina, on 11 November 2023, at the age of 90.

Business positions
Preceded by W. Paul Tippett Jr.	President of the American Motors Corporation; 1982–1986	Succeeded by Joseph E. Cappy
Preceded by W. Paul Tippett Jr.	CEO of the American Motors Corporation; 1984–1986	Succeeded by Joseph E. Cappy
Preceded by Andre de Spoelberch	CEO of Interbrew; 1988–1993	Succeeded by Hans Meerlo
