= Joseph E. Cappy =

American businessman

- Born: Joseph E. Capizzi; May 13, 1934 (age 92); Chicago, Illinois, U.S.
- Education: University of Wisconsin–Madison
- Occupation: Former CEO of American Motors and Dollar Thrifty Automotive Group
- Years active: 1956–2003
- Spouse: Carol Fedderly (m. 1954; death 1989) Patricia Duffy Harper (m. 1990)
- Children: 4

Joseph E. Cappy (born May 13, 1934) is an American business executive who was the final president and chief executive officer of American Motors Corporation and the first president and CEO of the Dollar Thrifty Automotive Group.

== Early life ==
Cappy was born on May 13, 1934, in Chicago to George Antoinetta (Mele) Cappy. The family was of Italian descent and changed their surname from Capizzi to Cappy, which his father felt was more "business-like". George Cappy worked in the retail business in Chicago until 1948, when he purchased a small department store in Wisconsin Dells, Wisconsin. Cappy graduated from Wisconsin Dells High School in 1952 and received a degree in marketing and accounting from the University of Wisconsin–Madison in 1956. He was a member of the UW-Madison Reserve Officers' Training Corps and served six months of active duty at Fort Eustis followed by seven-and-a-half years in the United States Army Reserve.

== Career ==
=== Ford ===
Cappy joined Ford Motor Company in 1956 as an accountant for the Edsel brand. After the Edsel division folded, he was marketing plans manager of custom cars and light trucks. From 1969 to 1971, Cappy was Ford's Detroit district general field sales manager. He next worked as a special recreational vehicles projects manager and was a recreational products sales manager from 1972 to 1973. Cappy then spent a year on the marketing staff of the sales planning office. From 1974 to 1977, he was Ford's district sales manager in Louisville, Kentucky. He then moved to the marketing department of the Lincoln–Mercury division, where he became general marketing manager in 1980.

=== American Motors Corporation ===
In 1982, he joined the American Motors Corporation as vice president of marketing. In 1985, he was promoted to executive vice president of operations, which put him in charge of manufacturing and supply. He was elected to the company's board of directors later that same year.

On March 23, 1986, Cappy was named president and chief executive officer of American Motors. On March 9, 1987, Chrysler purchased AMC for about $1.5 billion ($4,250,878,735 in 2025 dollars).

=== Chrysler ===
Cappy joined Chrysler following the sale as group vice president of the Jeep-Eagle division. In 1989, he was named Chrysler's vice president of brand development. The following year he became the company's vice president of international operations.

=== Dollar Thrifty Automotive Group ===
As part of a corporate reshuffling following the retirement of Chrysler CEO Lee Iacocca, Cappy became the head of the company's car rental subsidiaries, which included Thrifty Car Rental and Dollar Rent A Car, and its defense and electronics operation, Chrysler Technologies. In 1997, Chrysler spun off its car rental subsidiary into a separate company - the Dollar Thrifty Automotive Group. Cappy was chairman and CEO of Dollar Thrifty until his retirement in 2003.

== Personal life ==
Cappy's first wife, Carol, died in 1989 at the age of 54. On March 10, 1990, he married Patricia Duffy Harper in Detroit. In 1994, the Cappys moved to Tulsa, Oklahoma after Chrysler relocated its car rental operations there. From 2000 to 2005, Cappy was a member of the Oklahoma State Regents for Higher Education.

Business positions
Preceded by Jose Dedeurwaerder	President and CEO of the American Motors Corporation; 1986–1987	Succeeded by Position eliminated
Preceded by Position created	President and CEO of the Dollar Thrifty Automotive Group; 1997–2003	Succeeded by Gary L. Paxton
