= Eagle Premier =

Car produced by American Motors Corporation and Chrysler

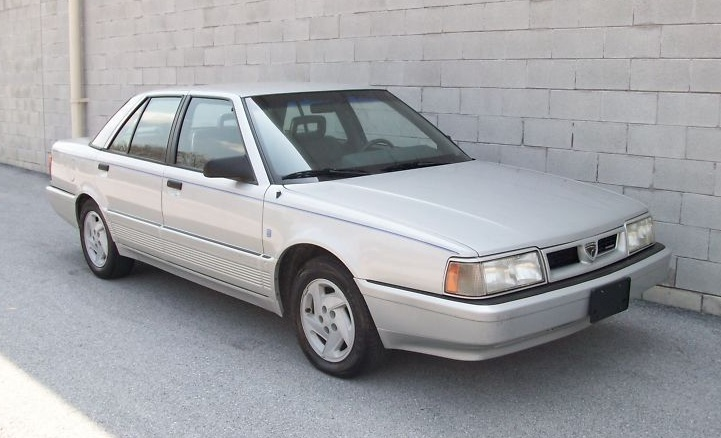
- 1992 Eagle Premier ES Limited

Overview
- Manufacturer: AMC/Renault; (before September 1987); Chrysler (Eagle); (after September 1987)
- Also called: AMC Premier; Dodge Monaco; Renault Premier (never sold)
- Production: September 1987 – 17 December 1991
- Model years: 1988–1992
- Assembly: Canada: Brampton, Ontario (Brampton Assembly)
- Designer: Giorgetto Giugiaro at Italdesign; Dick Teague

Body and chassis
- Class: Executive car (E)
- Body style: 4-door sedan
- Layout: Longitudinal front-engine, front-wheel drive
- Platform: Chrysler B-body
- Related: Dodge Monaco; Renault 25

Powertrain
- Engine: 2.5 L AMC I4; 3.0 L PRV V6
- Transmission: 4-speed Audi AR-4 automatic; 4-speed ZF 4HP18FL automatic

Dimensions
- Wheelbase: 106.0 in (2,692 mm)
- Length: 192.8 in (4,897 mm)
- Width: 70.0 in (1,778 mm)
- Height: 53.3 in (1,354 mm)
- Curb weight: 2,991–3,068 lb (1,357–1,392 kg)

Chronology
- Predecessor: AMC Matador
- Successor: Eagle Vision

The Eagle Premier is a full-size executive car that was developed by American Motors Corporation (AMC) during the 1980s through its partnership with Renault. This model was manufactured in the then-brand-new Brampton Assembly in Canada.

Chrysler Corporation bought the rights to the Premier when it acquired Renault's outstanding shares in AMC in 1987, and began selling the car under the new Eagle marque.

The four-door sedan was manufactured from September 1987 (for the 1988 model year) until December 1991 (for the 1992 model year). A rebadged variant was also marketed as the Dodge Monaco from 1990 until 1992. The Premier was exported to Japan where it was marketed as a Chrysler.

== Design ==
In 1982 American Motors and Renault, a major shareholder in AMC since 1979, began work on a new downsized full-size front-drive passenger car, code-named X-58, for introduction in late 1986. A companion two-door coupe, code named "X-59", was to debut for the 1988 model year. These two body styles were to be the first full-size cars sold by AMC since the 1978 AMC Matador to re-position the automaker with a broader product offering in the marketplace. The strategy was to expand AMC's reliance on sub-compact cars (which were the Alliance and Encore) as demand was increasing for larger, "family-size" cars such as the Chevrolet Celebrity and the new Ford Taurus.

Rather than engineer a completely new chassis for the Premier, the then-new Renault 25's monocoque underpinnings were used as a basis and adapted for the new product. Using the Renault 25 chassis the suspension was derived from the Renault Medallion (Renault 21). The suspension consists of a four-wheel fully independent system with MacPherson struts at the front wheels with a stabilizer bar while the rear wheels feature forward-angled gas-filled shock absorbers and the suspension setup has four torsion bars mounted across the car with two acting as springs and two as sway bars.

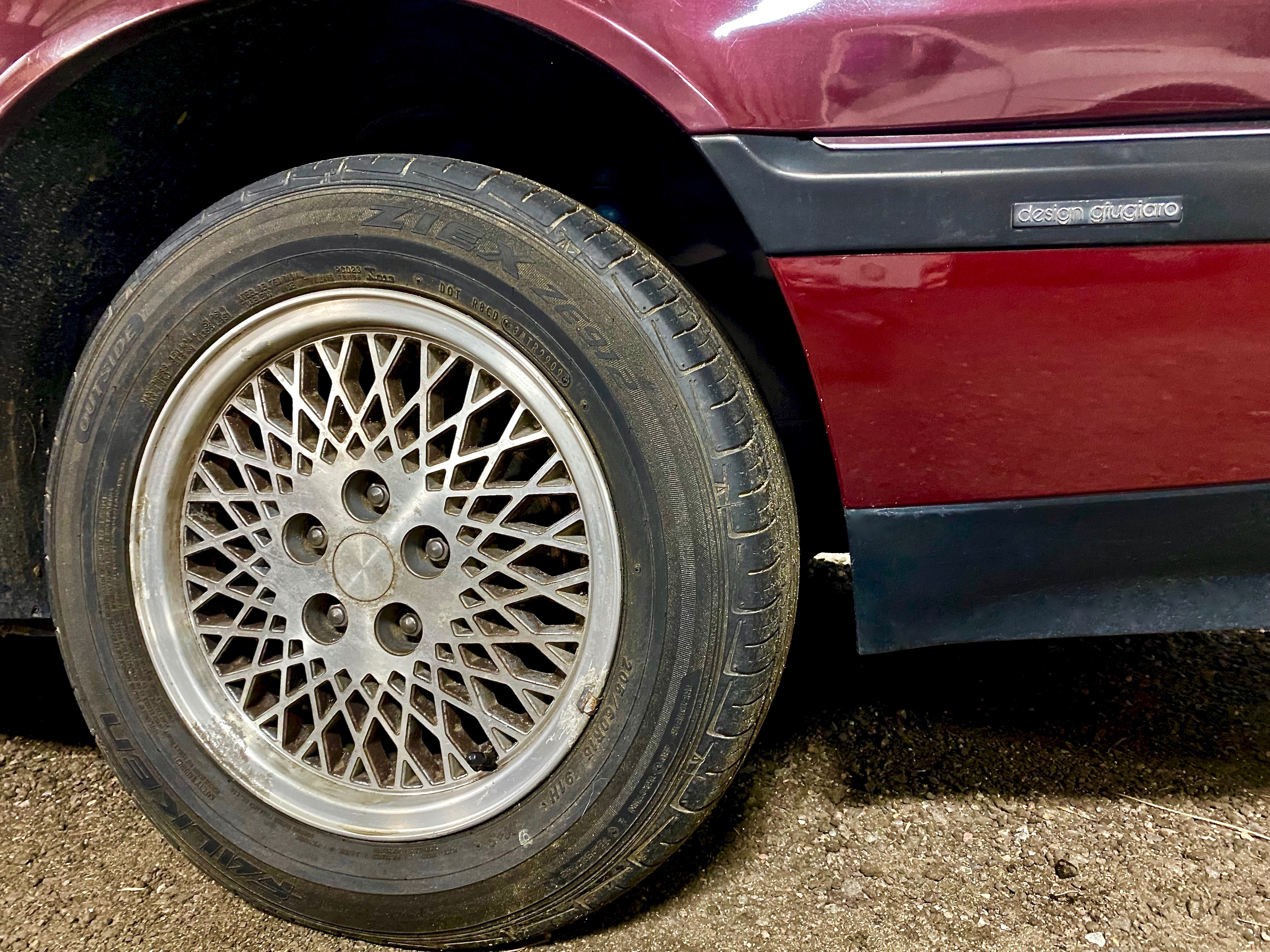
The "design giugiaro" badges on the front bumper sides

The exterior by Giorgetto Giugiaro's Italdesign was picked over other concepts generated by AMC's styling department and other independent firms. The Premier's body's drag coefficient of 0.31 is slightly lower (more efficient) than that of the 1986 Ford Taurus that was well known for its aerodynamic shape. The Premier's body was finished using a baked enamel clearcoat for all the available colors. The body was covered by a seven-year, 100,000-mile (160,934 km) warranty. The car's trunk capacity was also large, offering 16.4 cu ft (464 L) of cargo space.

The Eagle also featured new technology to improve the luminous efficiency of its headlamp system, afford greater styling freedom, and have a rectangular frontal aspect. The 1988 Eagle Premier was one of the first cars featuring Valeo headlamps with nonparabolic, complex-surface reflector headlamps with optic lenses.

Stretched in all dimensions, the Premier provided more interior room than any of its contemporaries. The interior was an all-new design by AMC's in-house staff under the direction of Dick Teague. It also included features that were considered unique at the time. The instrument panel featured "a heavy dose of electronics", with all driver controls housed within a fingertip distance from the steering wheel. This included a dash-mounted gear selector that has been described reminiscent of the 1955 Chrysler PowerFlite transmission shifter. The Premier features a metal lever at the end of which was a grip handle: if the gear selector shifted downward in the traditional fashion, the lever dropped into the dash pod in which it was mounted.

The climate controls used an unusual up-down button that cycled through the different heating modes, indicated by an array of lights. All of these controls were housed in a control panel on the right side of the steering column. On the left side of the column, another control contained the light and windshield wiper controls. The turn signal control was also electronic returning to its centered position immediately after a driver signaled a turn, and a gong indicated its cancellation after completing a turn. The optional cruise control was built into the leather-wrapped steering wheel. Other features included intermittent wipers, as well as automatic variable-speed that adjusted wiper speed to the amount of water that hit the windshield; with less moisture, the slower they would move, but increasing their action if a passing truck splashed the windshield with a large amount of water. Another exclusive was the computer controlled automatic temperature control climate system that did not run the interior blower fan until the heater core became warm, thus enhancing passenger comfort.

Standard on all Premiers was an electronically controlled AM/FM stereo sound system. It had an exclusive feature of being a "self-diagnosing" radio. A premium speaker system was standard on the ES models. Successive years featured more sophisticated entertainment units that included a seven band equalizer with memory functions, an advanced cassette deck with music search functionality, and a CD player.

For the initial launch, there was a choice of two powertrains. Eschewing the Renault 25's French-built four-cylinder engines, the base Premier LX trim featured a standard 2.5 L AMC four-cylinder engine. Featuring electronically controlled throttle-body fuel injection, it developed a peak power output of 111 hp (83 kW; 113 PS) and 142 lb⋅ft (193 N⋅m) of torque at 2500 rpm. This engine was coupled to a new electronically controlled four-speed automatic gearbox, developed by ZF Friedrichshafen. Fuel economy for the base model was EPA estimated at 22 mpg_{‑US} (11 L/100 km; 26 mpg_{‑imp}) in the city and 31 mpg_{‑US} (7.6 L/100 km; 37 mpg_{‑imp}) on the highway, giving it a 527-mile (848 km) cruising range with the 17 US gal (64 L; 14 imp gal) gas tank. It is unclear as to whether any four cylinder models were actually produced and sold though.

Optional in the LX and standard in ES models was a 3.0 L version of the Peugeot-Renault-Volvo (PRV) V6 engine, fitted with multiple port fuel injection, producing peak power and torque figures of 150 hp (112 kW; 152 PS) at 5000 rpm and 171 lb⋅ft (232 N⋅m) at 3750 rpm. Fuel efficiency of the V6 was rated at 18 mpg_{‑US} (13 L/100 km; 22 mpg_{‑imp}) for the city and 27 mpg_{‑US} (8.7 L/100 km; 32 mpg_{‑imp}) on the highway. Factory acceleration estimates from standstill to 60 miles per hour (97 km/h) were 11.5 seconds with the four-cylinder, and 10 seconds with the six. The Premier's powertrains were covered by a 7-year, 70,000-mile (112,654 km) warranty, which was longer than offered by any of the competitors at the time.

Developed by AMC, which was "the Big Three's little sister ... with almost no resources, and fighting a vastly superior enemy", Bob Lutz, then a vice president at Chrysler, wrote that the Premier sedan was one of the "impressive succession of new products" that Chrysler gained from acquiring the small automaker. The Eagle Premier replaced the so-called Liberty car that Chrysler had been developing as the basis of its future cars for many years, but was experiencing problems with this major project.

The Eagle Premier was described as "a world-class car" by automotive journalists, in addition to its international origins with an Italian design and Canadian assembly. "Considered by some the most sophisticated car in Chrysler's lineup", the Eagle Premier offers an "incredible 122 cubic feet of interior room; almost unheard of for a mid-sized passenger car" along with "European handling". The Premier was "final offspring of the AMC-Renault marriage" and the new car entered the marketplace "well endowed in just about every department. It has the most powerful conventional engines in its field, state-of-the-art electronics with a first-ever feature, and is made in the newest assembly plant in the world." Road test by Car and Driver magazine described the new "Euro-sedan" as competitive, a "pleasant surprise," "with a dash of weirdness," and concluded that "it's a sure bet to scare hell out of its competition."

== Model years ==
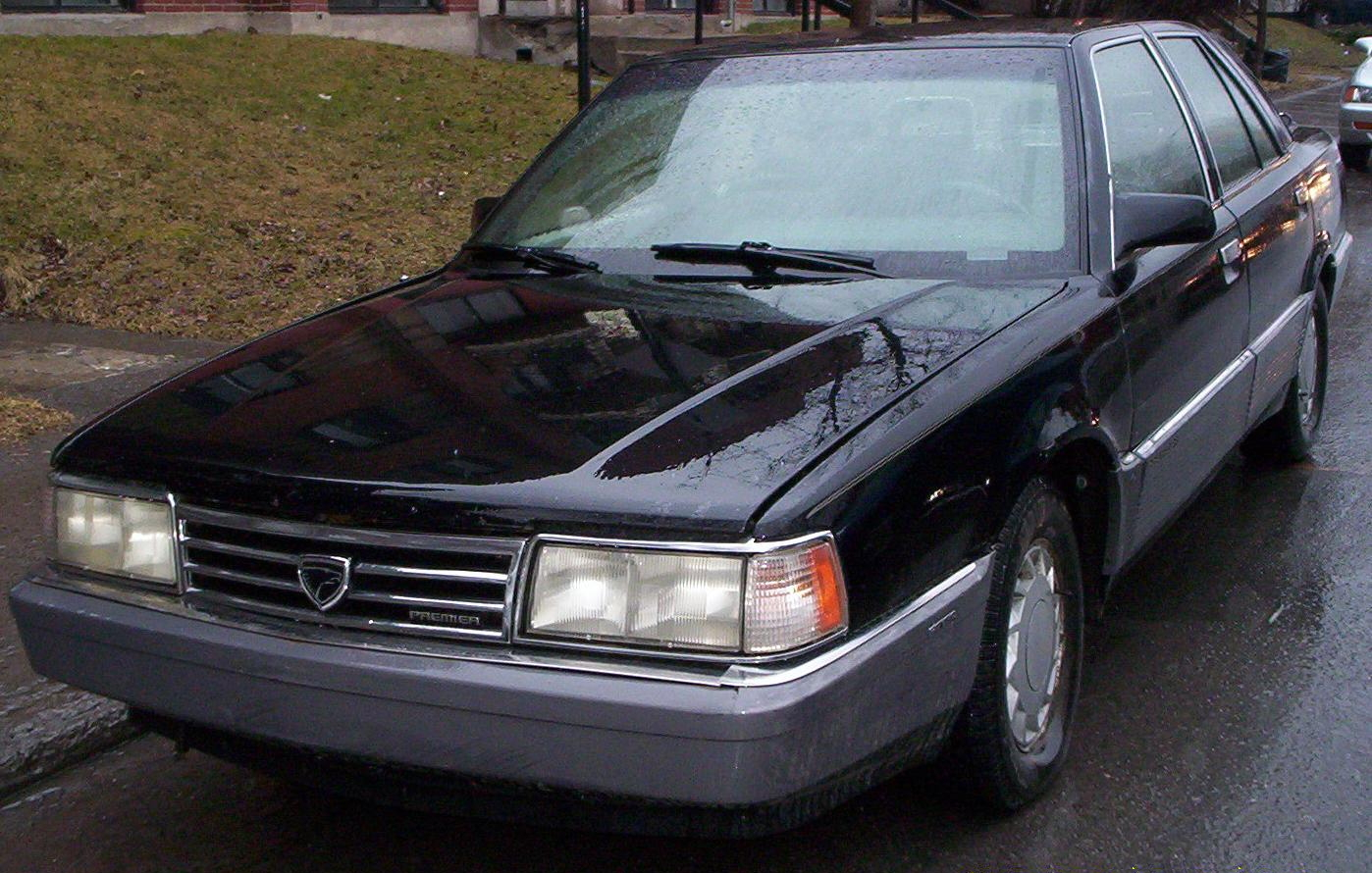
Eagle Premier

=== 1988 ===
The Eagle Premier was launched in January 1988, with the first production models rolling off the assembly line on 28 September 1987. Although the car is sometimes referred to as a Renault Premier, this car was never marketed anywhere in the world as a Renault. Pre-production prototypes left the factory with Renault emblems on their grille and wheel covers, but had an Eagle nameplate on the trunk lids. The Eagle marketing department had to indicate this difference in its dealer information brochures and videos. Before its January 1988 launch, all pre-production cars had the Renault emblem removed from the grille and steering column horn hub pad. Depending on which stereo system was ordered, one would find either a Renault or Eagle emblem in the car through 1989 on the stereo. It was to have been the first body style in a series of three, along with a four-door station wagon and a two-door coupe. After Chrysler purchased Renault's stake (46%) in AMC and all other outstanding stock (54%), the wagon and coupe body styles were canceled as was a planned Premier DL model featuring a five-speed manual gearbox.

The interior of the LX featured standard six-passenger seating, with reclining 55/45 split front bench seats along with a rear seat that included a fold-down center armrest. Map pockets were standard in the front seatbacks. The standard four-speed automatic transmissions were operated using a column shifter. The ES models included lower bodyside cladding, a firmer suspension, and larger "touring" tires, as well as individual front bucket seats with adjustable see-through headrests and a full-length console with center armrest. The ES models had seating for five adults. The front bucket seats were optional in the LX, and a console-mounted gear shift was optional in both the LX and ES.

The Premier was highlighted in Chrysler's broad product line as being "shaped right" in its being the most aerodynamic sedan built in North America and offering "an American car with European sophistication and handling."

=== 1989 ===
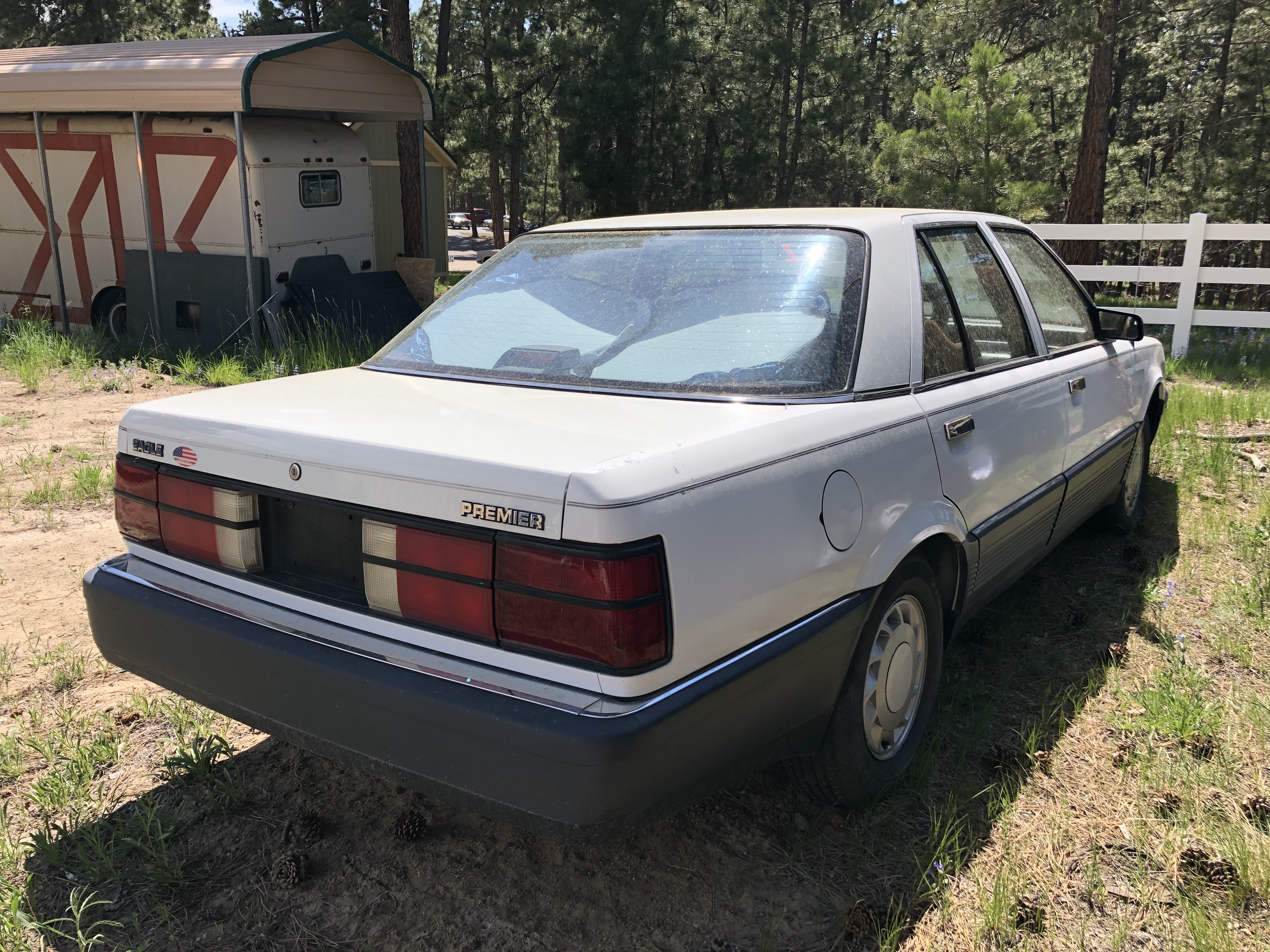
1989 Eagle Premier

The second model year the Premier saw almost no other changes except for the addition of cruise control and the mid-year introduction of an ES Limited model featuring monochromatic paint and body-colored trim. The list of standard features was expanded or enhanced such as eight premium "Accusound by Jensen" speakers becoming standard on ES models.

Marketing focused on "the swift reflexes of eagles" describing the Premier's fully independent suspension components to be sure-footed and athletic to "inspire driver confidence" in addition to the car's exclusive seven-year, 70,000-mile protection plan.

The "sporty" two-door companion model that was announced by Iacocca for this model year to "get the Eagle soaring" with new products and a "brand personality that's unique ...and exciting... and upscale" was not released.

==== Exports to Japan ====
During 1989 sales in the Japanese market began as the Chrysler Premier ES. Available in one version and included the 3.0 L V6 engine and four-speed automatic transmission. The maximum power was 150 PS (110 kW). While branded as a Chrysler and given the model code E6U, the Eagle badging remained unchanged from the North American model. The only visible changes were indicator lights on the front fenders and the incorporation of amber turn signals into the rear lights to meet local requirements. Marketing of the special model ended during 1990.

=== 1990 ===
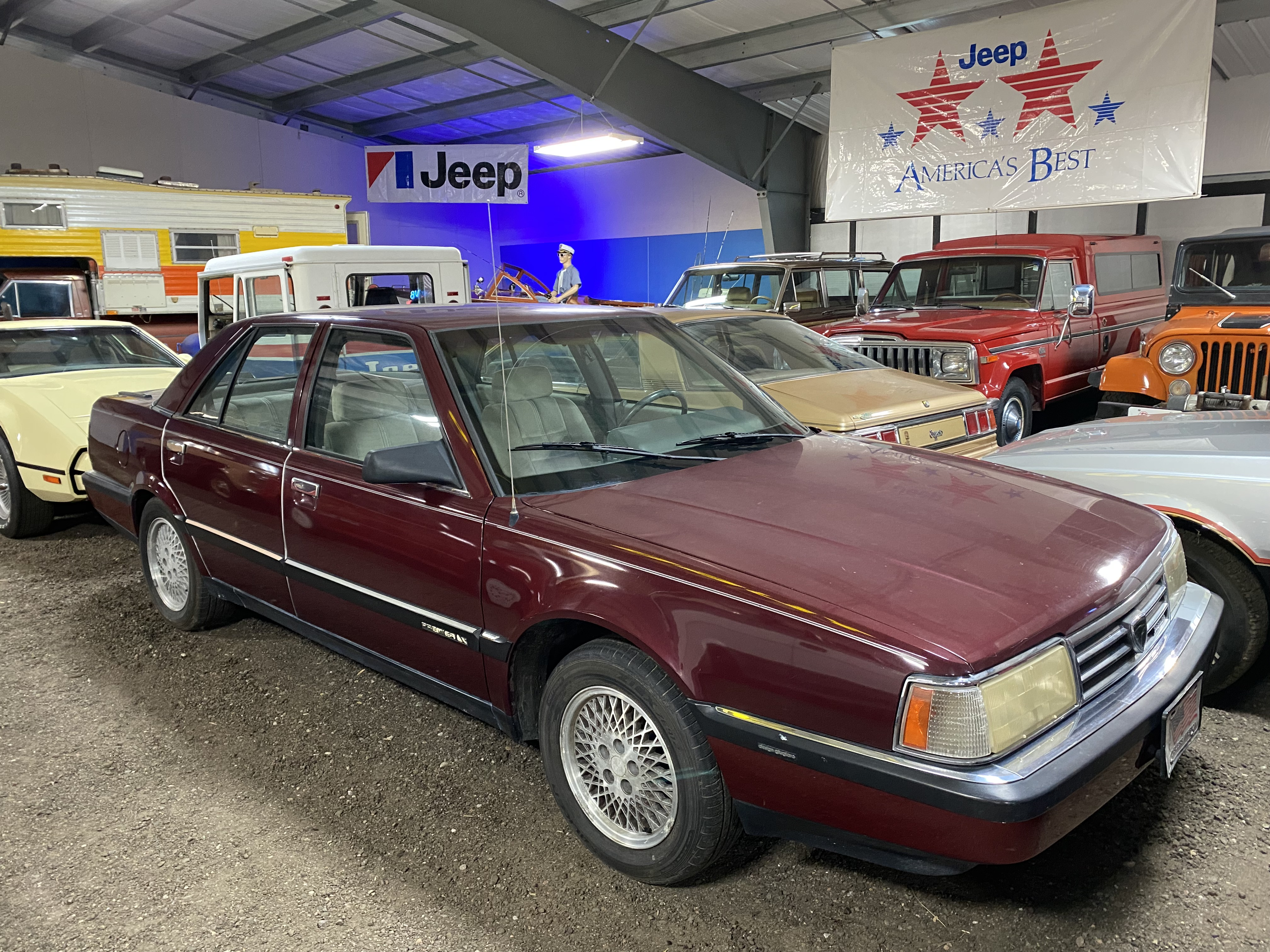
1990 Eagle Premier LX

In 1990 the Premier was substantially reengineered. Standard were four-wheel disc brakes and a stainless steel exhaust system. The electrical system was replaced with standard Chrysler parts that proved to be more reliable than the original Renix system. The exterior was changed slightly, the Design Giugiaro badges being removed from the front fenders as a result. The fuel crisis period was fading and most buyers selected the V6 engine. The four-cylinder engine was officially dropped from the lineup, with the V6 remaining as the sole engine.

A badge engineered version of the Premier was added using a familiar Chrysler name, the Dodge Monaco, a moniker that was first used by Dodge in 1965 and last used in 1978 on a full-size, rear-drive sedan.

Because of its design "as up-to-date as anything in the mid-sized market," the Premier now became the foundation for Chrysler's next generation of automobiles.

The automatic transmission shifter was relocated to the floor center console.

=== 1991 ===
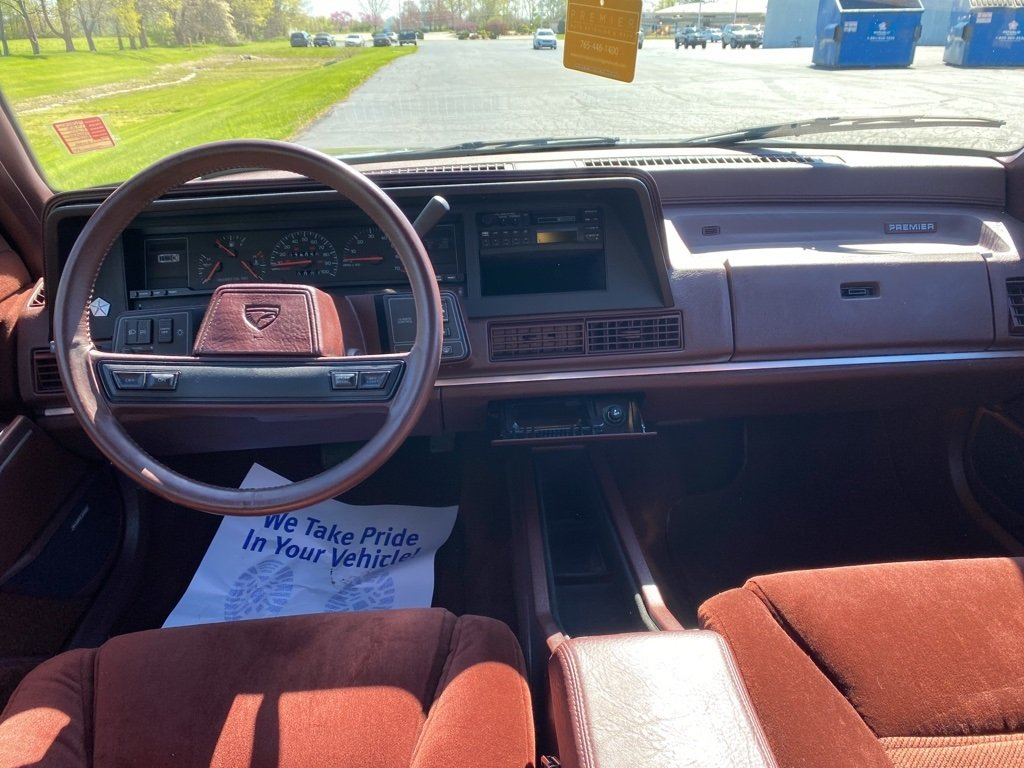
1988 Eagle Premier interior

The 1991 model year had little news for the Premier except for a new anti-lock braking system (ABS) that was also available on the Canadian-built Dodge Monaco twin. The new safety feature came standard on the ES Limited and was optional on other models. The Limited model received a new front grille and rear tail lamp assemblies.

The marketplace saw a downturn and all automakers began offering incentives to move inventory. At the beginning of the year, supplies of the Eagle Premier climbed up to 222 days and Chrysler gave a $1,000 discount to dealers on the invoice price, a $1,500 rebate to purchasers, and a $2,000 incentive to the dealer per car after their fourth sale. An ES Limited model listing for $19,978 was only $15,478 after the marketing incentives. By the end of the year, Jeep-Eagle dealers had low inventories of Premiers – with only 28 days supply – compared to 119 days for overstocked cars such as the Chevrolet Caprice.

=== 1992 ===
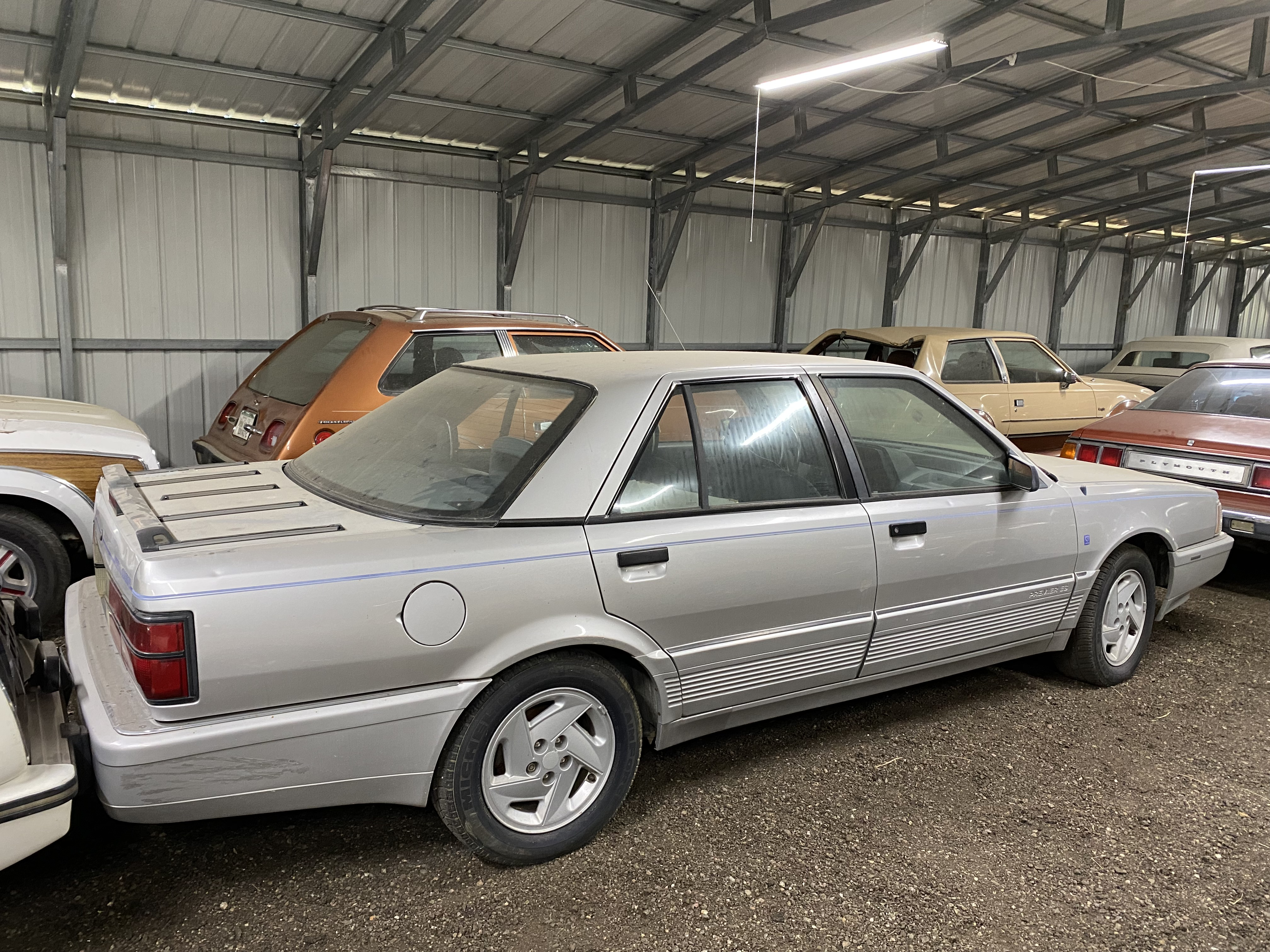
1992 Eagle Premier ES

The Eagle Premier and its badge engineered variant, the Dodge Monaco, continued mostly unchanged for 1992, except every model received the grille and tail lamps that were only on the Limited in 1991. Chrysler also announced it would be the Premier's final year as the automaker prepared to launch all its new LH models in the Bramalea assembly plant. Bramalea ended Dodge Monaco and Eagle Premier output on 17 December 1991.

Production Figures:

Eagle Premier Production Figures
| Year: | Units produced: |
|---|---|
| 1988 | 45,546 |
| 1989 | 41,349 |
| 1990 | 14,243 |
| 1991 | 11,634 |
| 1992 | 4,730 |
| Total: | 117,502 |

== Legacy ==
The Eagle brand targeted consumers that would not typically consider purchasing an American sedan, "but would have instead sought out a Volvo or an Audi." The "upscale" Premier was the flagship of the new Eagle division at Chrysler and in the same class "as cars like the Audi 5000, ... roomy, understated and elegantly turned out."

Popular Science, in a four-car road test, considered the Premier one of the sportiest sedans (by measure of road holding and drive precision) available on the American market. The fully independent suspension on all the wheels made for better ride quality and handling characteristics, as did the rack and pinion steering design. "The Premier was for its size, the lightest car that Chrysler built at the time [with a shipping weight of 2,999 lb (1,360 kg)], the stiffest (torsionally), and the best riding almost 8.7 in (221 mm) of wheel travel vs. 4.5 for the K-cars that underpinned every Chrysler car then available. It benefited from decades of Renault experience with front-wheel-drive, and a good example will still impress even today." The engineering levels achieved in the Premier are arguably the most refined in a sedan that was then produced by AMC or Chrysler.

The original projections were to have annual production of 150,000 Premiers. Magna International had signed a contract in 1986 to supply body panels for the Premiers. As a result, the automotive supplier received $10 million in grants from the governments of both Canada and Ontario to expand the metal stamping plant in Milton, Ontario. However, the Premier did not achieve its sales targets, with calendar year production for 1989 only reaching 32,720 examples.

Critics have argued that Chrysler did not properly market the Premier, having confused its intended market. ES models were compared directly with the Audi 80, Acura Legend, and similar 'import' sedans, while LX models were aimed at a lower-tier market competing against the Ford Taurus and GM A-platform cars (Buick Century, Chevrolet Celebrity, Oldsmobile Cutlass Ciera). Chrysler also ended up with six different brands after the purchase of AMC, just one less than GM, which was four times as large an automaker. Not only could Chrysler not afford to properly promote and advertise each of its brands, but it also faced the legacy of failure by French cars in the United States.

The Premier carried many vestiges of AMC and Renault's engineering long after Chrysler acquired the car's design. For example, the vehicle identification number for the entire 1988 model year production retained AMC format. The AMC logo was featured on many of the car's components through to the end of production.

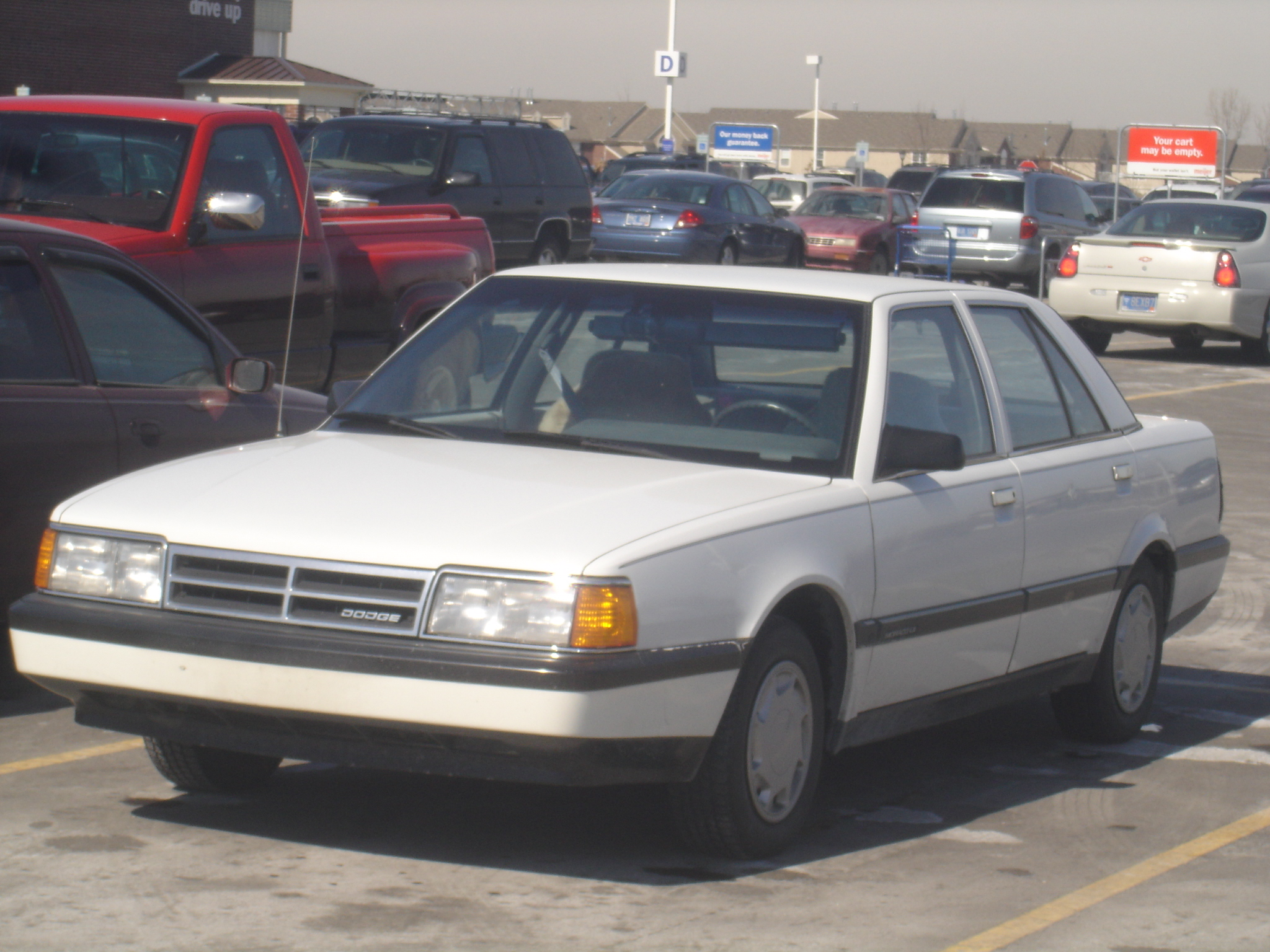
Dodge Monaco badge engineered variant

The introduction of a rebadged model named Dodge Monaco resulted from a contractual obligation to use 260,000 of the PRV engines over five years, a clause in the AMC buyout from Renault. The Monaco sold in low numbers, and both it and the Premier were canceled in 1992. There was little marketing support for the Premier by the Jeep-Eagle dealers themselves because they were focused on selling the highly successful and more profitable Jeep models. Furthermore, the decision to eventually combine Jeep-Eagle with Chrysler-Plymouth dealers called for the long-term corporate goal of phasing out the Eagle brand. There were 139,051 Premiers and Monacos built at Bramalea. Chrysler paid a penalty for every car not produced and V6 engine not purchased from Renault.

A new, "highly advanced" factory (called Bramalea Assembly) was built to manufacture the Premier at Bramalea. This was near an existing AMC plant in Brampton, Ontario, Canada. This state-of-the-art plant was opened in 1986 and was one of AMC's assets that interested Chrysler. It was renamed Brampton Assembly after the buyout. Brampton Assembly was retooled for the production of the Chrysler LH-cars that debuted in the autumn of 1992, including the Premier's replacement, the Vision, and the Vision's sister vehicles, the Dodge Intrepid and the Chrysler Concorde.

The Premier inspired many of the LH platform's design features. François Castaing, formerly AMC's Vice President of product engineering and development, became Chrysler's Vice President of vehicle engineering in 1988, and as a result, the Premier was the starting point for Chrysler's new LH sedans. Although the cab forward styling was quite different, the engines in the LH cars were mounted longitudinally, like the Premier. This was "a hallmark of Renault's front-wheel-drive designs" and unlike any other car built by Chrysler up to that time. The LH platform's dedicated transmission, the A606, was also quite similar in design to the electronically controlled automatic featured in four-cylinder Premiers. The Premier's body shell was used for LH prototype development mules, under which the LH drivetrain was tested.

Although only a four-door sedan, the Premier could be a "future classic" according to an automotive journalist, Dan Roth, as "one of the best American cars of the last 20 years, able to hold its own against luxury European marques, and being a caretaker of the last AMC car (Jeeps aren't cars!) would be a responsibility we'd relish."
