= Brampton Assembly =

Automobile factory

Brampton Assembly Plant
- Operated: 1986–2023
- Location: 2000 Williams Parkway East; Brampton, Ontario
- Coordinates: 43.752°N 79.718°W
- Industry: Automotive
- Products: Automobiles
- Employees: 3,045 (2022)
- Area: 269 acres (109 ha)
- Volume: 2,950,000 sq ft (274,064 m^{2})
- Owners: American Motors Corporation (1986–1987); Chrysler (1987–1998); DaimlerChrysler (1998–2007); Chrysler (2007–2014); Fiat Chrysler Automobiles (2014–2021); Stellantis (2021–2026); Roshel (2026– )

Brampton Assembly Plant is a factory located at 2000 Williams Parkway East, in the Bramalea, Ontario, area of Brampton, Canada. It was built to produce automobiles by American Motors Corporation (AMC) for US$260 million.

The manufacturing plant was specifically designed to build the Eagle Premier. Chrysler acquired AMC in 1987, and the factory later primarily assembled full-sized Chrysler automobiles. Over 7 million cars were built up to 2023 before the plant shut down for a retooling process needed for Jeep production. However, the company paused the plan in early 2025 due to changes in tariffs during the second Trump administration.

On 9 November 2026, Stellantis signed an agreement with defense contractor Roshel to sell the idled Brampton Assembly plant for use in advanced manufacturing.

The factory was originally opened as the "Bramalea Assembly" under American Motors. At the time, AMC had another, older facility in Brampton known as "Brampton Assembly", located at Kennedy Road and Steeles Avenue. It was built and operated from 1961 to 1992 by American Motors and later Chrysler, assembling AMC passenger cars and Jeep vehicles. After the older facility was shut down and sold off for warehouse use in 1992, Chrysler renamed the newer Bramalea Assembly as the Brampton Assembly.

== History ==
=== American Motors ===
In June 1984, American Motors Corporation (AMC) established an agreement with the governments of Ontario and Canada to build a new assembly plant. Both the national and provincial governments loaned AMC CA$100 million each to build the CA$764 million facility. The agreement also included a royalty to the government equal to 1% of the sales price of every vehicle produced at the facility.

The infrastructure builder EllisDon Construction completed the US$260 million (US$805,733,504 in 2025 dollars) plant and associated buildings. The factory was opened by AMC in 1986 as "Bramalea Assembly", a state-of-the-art robotics-based assembly facility with 2,950,000 sq ft (274,064 m^{2}) of floor space located on 269 acres (108.9 ha) specifically designed to produce the Eagle Premier.

The production line speed was initially about 400 cars per shift (54 jobs per hour) with only one shift scheduled. There were frequent layoffs at this new factory, while AMC's old Brampton plant, located at Kennedy Road, worked steadily to produce Jeep Wranglers.

=== Chrysler - Stellantis ===
This facility was acquired (along with the rest of AMC) by Chrysler in August 1987. The factory was ranked top in Chrysler's 1988 quality audit of cars produced in each of the automaker's plants.

Production of the Chrysler LH platform cars began in June 1992 and continued with the updated LH cars in 1997. Production switched to the rear-wheel drive Chrysler LX platform cars in January 2004. The retooling for the LX platform was described as "a low-budget effort", as Chrysler was experiencing some hardships at the time. Robots in the body shop were hand-me-downs from other plants. The paint shop was described to be the oldest FiatChrysler had in North America at that time.

The attached "Brampton Satellite Stamping", which opened in 1991, was built for the launch of the Chrysler LH platform. At that time, Brampton Assembly operated with three production shifts. The facility became the city of Brampton's largest employer in 1991.

On 19 July 2007, Chrysler Group announced an investment of US$1.2 billion in the Brampton plant for upgrades to produce the Chrysler 300 series, Dodge Magnum, and Dodge Charger, as well as a $500 million manufacturing investment to prepare for European-market LX platform product loading.

On 16 August 2007, the one-millionth LX rear-wheel-drive vehicle platform rolled-off Brampton Assembly's production line.

On 1 November 2007, Chrysler announced that it was ending the third shift in Brampton, with the loss of 1,000 direct jobs, and declared that production of the Dodge Magnum in Brampton would end in early 2008.

On 1 May 2009, both the Brampton Assembly and Windsor Assembly plants were shut down as a result of Chrysler's bankruptcy protection filing in the United States on 30 April 2009, affecting about 2,700 employees at the Brampton Assembly and 4,400 at the Windsor Assembly. A Chrysler parts plant in Etobicoke, Toronto operated until 10 May 2009, when it was closed down for 30 to 60 days, affecting 300 employees, while the company went through restructuring under court-ordered creditor protection.

After the reorganization, Chrysler announced the launch of new models of the 300 and Charger to be produced in the Brampton assembly plant, beginning in 2010.

The factory began production of the redesigned 2011 Chrysler 300 in January 2011. At this time, total employment was 2,871 (2,733 hourly; 138 salaried), working two shifts.

In 2012, employees at the Chrysler factories in Windsor and Brampton, Ontario ratified the CAW's labour agreement by an overwhelming majority, without any information from the automaker about plans for new products or investment at either plant. As of December 2012, the Brampton Assembly Plant was the single largest employer in Canada's 11th largest city.

In 2013, the car assembly operations with 3,400 workers were ranked the second largest private employer in Brampton according to the city's economic development office.

On 19 August 2014, the first Challenger SRT Hellcat (VIN #700001) rolled off the assembly line. It sold at the Barrett-Jackson auction in Las Vegas auction for $825,000 to benefit Opportunity Village, a non-profit charity for those with intellectual disabilities in the Las Vegas area. Rick Hendrick, owner of Hendrick Motorsports, bought the 707-hp "pony car" for his collection.

The plant earned "bronze status" in 2015 for its work in implementing "World Class Manufacturing" (WCM), a "methodology that focuses on eliminating waste, increasing productivity, and improving quality and safety in a systematic and organized way."

Fiat Chrysler Automobiles announced in May 2019 (during Donald Trump's first presidency) plans for investments in new and existing assembly plants in Michigan "after intense political pressure in the U.S. to increase domestic manufacturing." This strategy could be an opportunity for Canadian parts suppliers, but also mean cuts in production at FCA's facilities in Ontario that include Brampton Assembly. Although there is still demand for the models produced by Brampton Assembly, "the market has gone really soft for cars, especially for sedans" and future FCA products may not use the platform currently made for the Chrysler 300, Dodge Charger, and Dodge Challenger.

As of 2021, the facility may see a new generation of the LX platform or be converted to making batteries for the automaker, given its proximity to other Stellantis facilities. Because the property is in a rapidly expanding suburb of Toronto, the increasing traffic congestion impedes shipments, while the outright sale of the land would make it excellent for housing development.

In 2022, Stellantis announced a $2.8 billion (3.6 billion Canadian dollars) investment, thus preserving the futures of its Canadian operations in Windsor and Brampton assembly plants. This includes Brampton Assembly Plant making a transition to new "flexible architecture" for the company's electrification plans. Further changes were released that production of its new STLA Large platform cars will be in Windsor with Chrysler 300, Dodge Challenger and Dodge Charger assembly ending at Brampton in 2024." The Brampton plant will then undergo retooling and modernizing to be "flexible, multi-energy vehicle assembly facilities" to "produce the electric vehicles of the future."

During August 2023, Stellantis held an event for select visitors to provide a final tour of the Brampton Assembly Plant. This open house by invitation commemorated the "birthplace of automotive legends for decades" starting from 1986 and Chrysler's purchase of the factory in 1987. The facility will transform in 2024 with the production of flexible electrified automobile designs scheduled in 2025. Professional automotive journalists were able to order vehicles and see them being built.

The ratification of the contract with Stellantis by the Canadian Auto Workers calls for Brampton Assembly to be retooled for the next-generation Jeep Compass that has been built in Toluca, Mexico. Stellantis is planning a US$970 million (1.32 billion Canadian-dollar) investment so that Brampton can build cars with internal combustion engines as well as battery-electric vehicles. Plans are for the plant to start building the new Jeep Compass on a single shift in the fourth quarter of 2025.

The union agreement also includes the installation of air conditioning systems for the plant, a requirement that mandatory shift changes be announced by Wednesday of the week before the change, and also studying the possibility of having day-care on-site.

Stellantis paused retooling of the Brampton plant in February 2025, shortly after the second presidency of Donald Trump announced tariffs against Canadian goods, a decision that undermined trade under the United States–Mexico–Canada Agreement and disrupted the integrated auto industry supply chains.

On 15 October 2025, the new Stellantis CEO, Antonio Filosa, announced plans to invest $13 billion in the U.S. over the next four years, in response to tariff pressures from the U.S. government. The move left the Canadian assembly plant idle, sparked threats of legal action from Ottawa over broken funding commitments, and initiated discussions about a potential sale of the facility. Canadian Prime Minister Mark Carney recalled that the Jeep Compass was scheduled to be produced in Canada. Carney wrote that Canada expects Stellantis to fulfill the promises made to its employees at Brampton.

The facility has been inactive since December 2023 impacting over 2,200 laid-off workers. Plans for production of a new electric Jeep at Brampton were shifted to a factory in the United States as a result of U.S. tariffs. This was just one of the signals that the automaker was considering a departure from the facility, with another was decision to sell 32 acres (12.9 ha) of property.

Stellantis told Unifor in August 2026 it is "seriously evaluating" full closure and sale of Brampton Assembly as well as negotiations with a potential buyer. The union representing the workers described the decision to be the first for an automaker put both scraping the site and selling it instead of continuing keeping it unresolved. Canadian officials described the erratic U.S. government trade strategies, continuing tariff threats, and potential U.S.-focused incentives as problematic.

Stellantis signed an agreement on 9 November 2026 with defense contractor Roshel to sell the idled Brampton facility and associated equipment for an undisclosed amount.

=== Former products ===
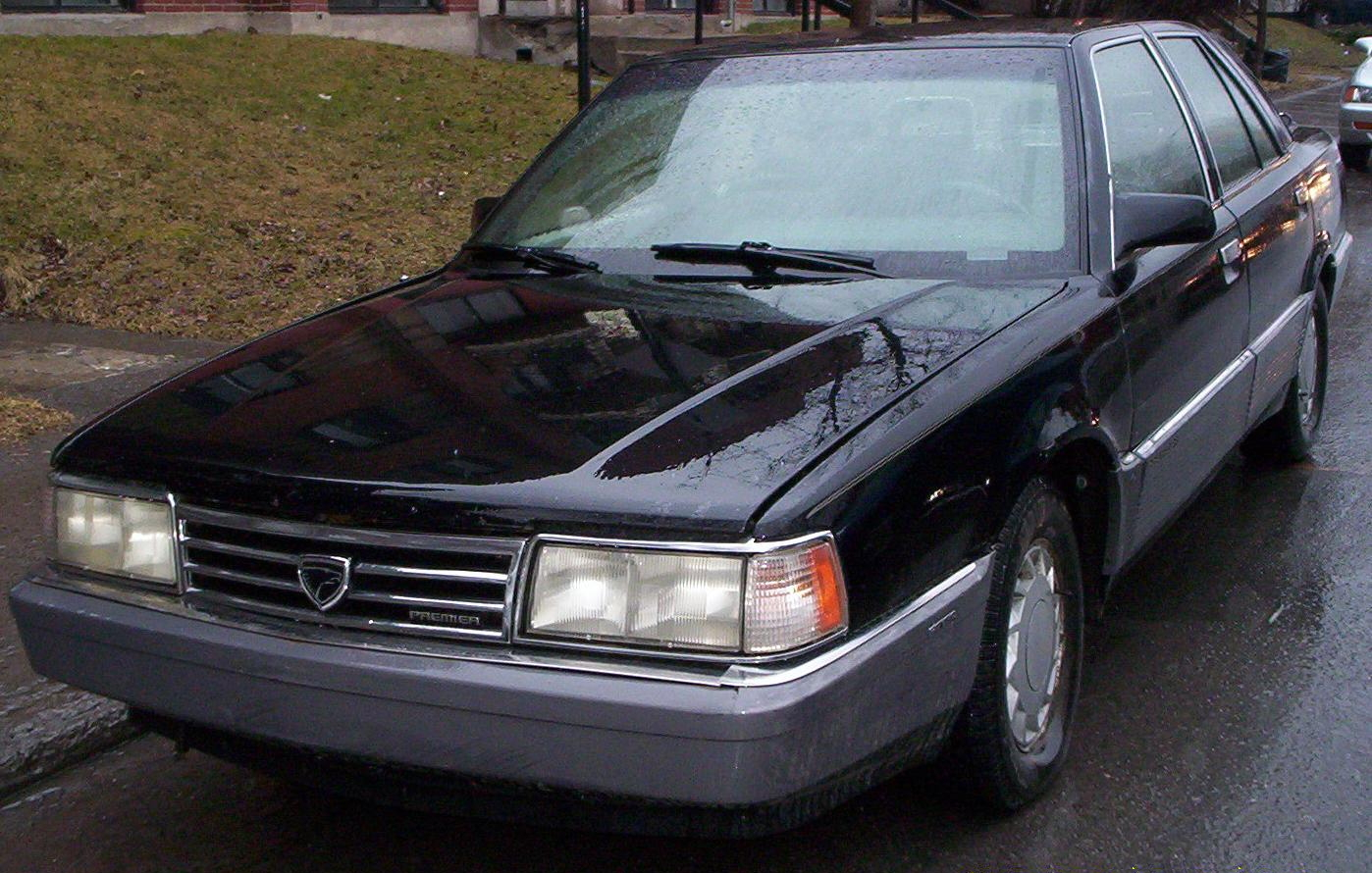
Eagle Premier

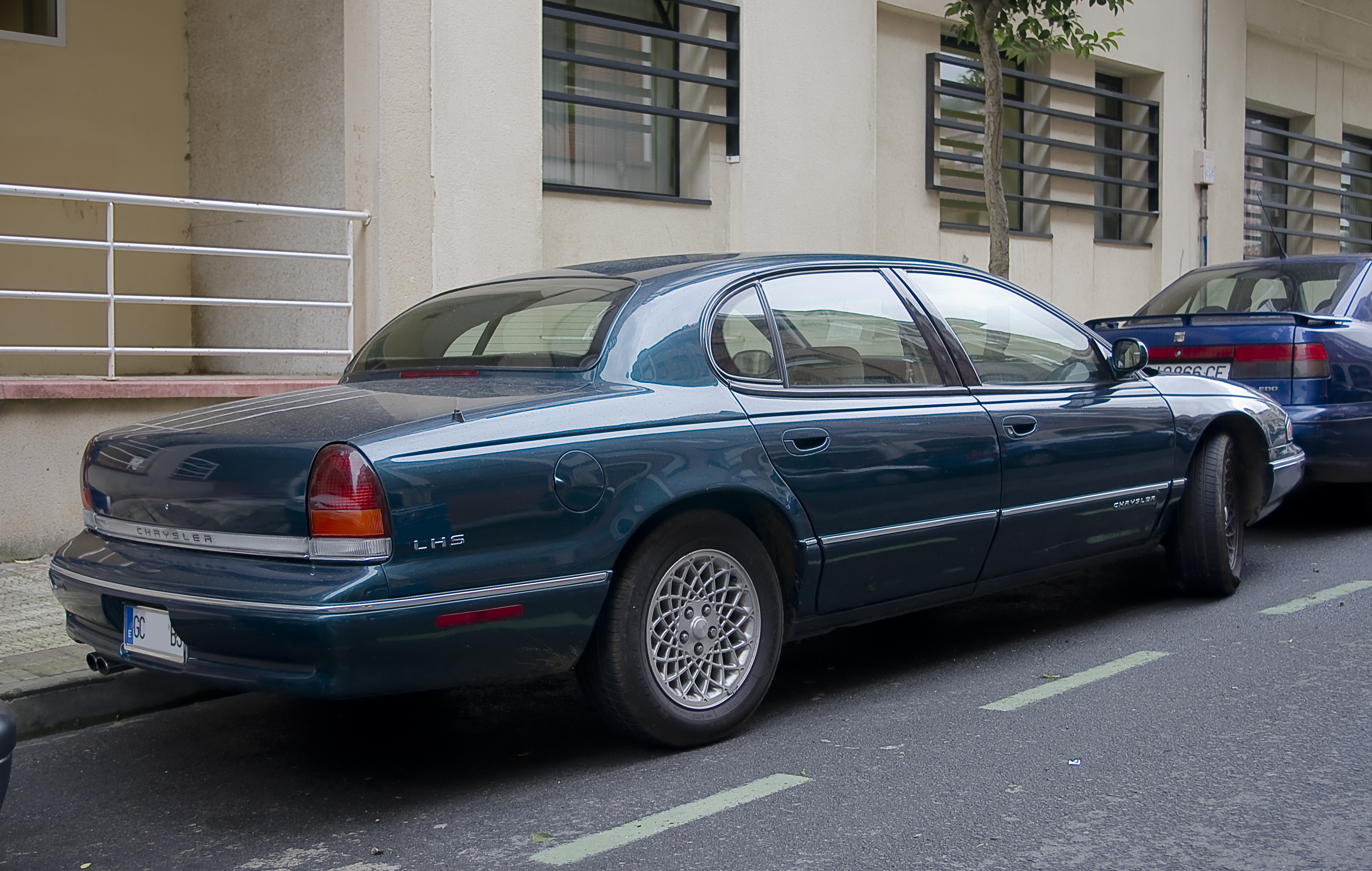
1994 Chrysler LHS

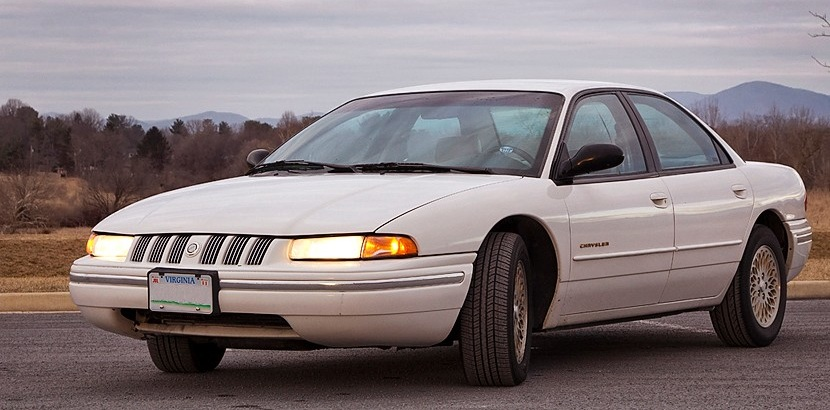
1996 Chrysler Concorde

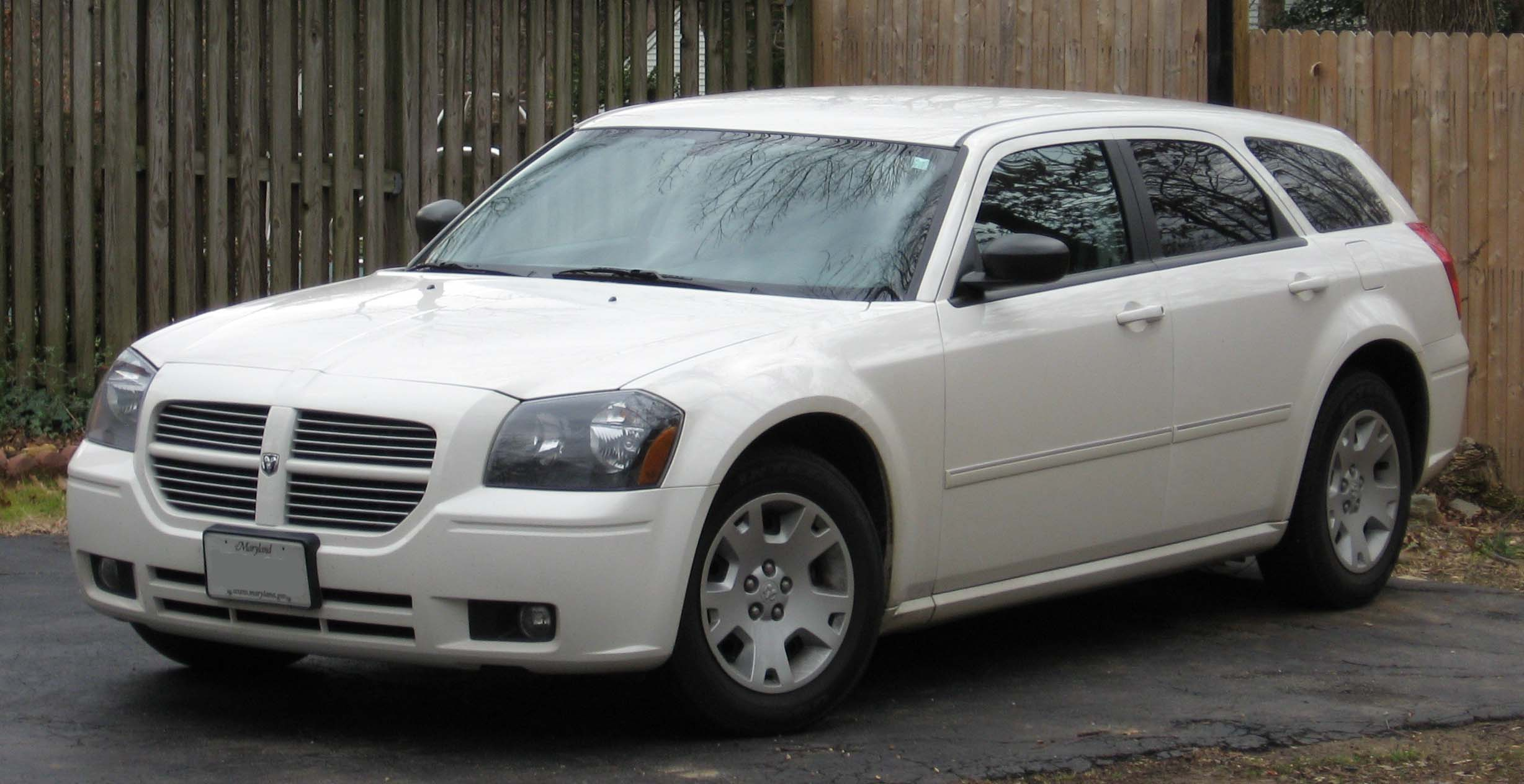
Dodge Magnum

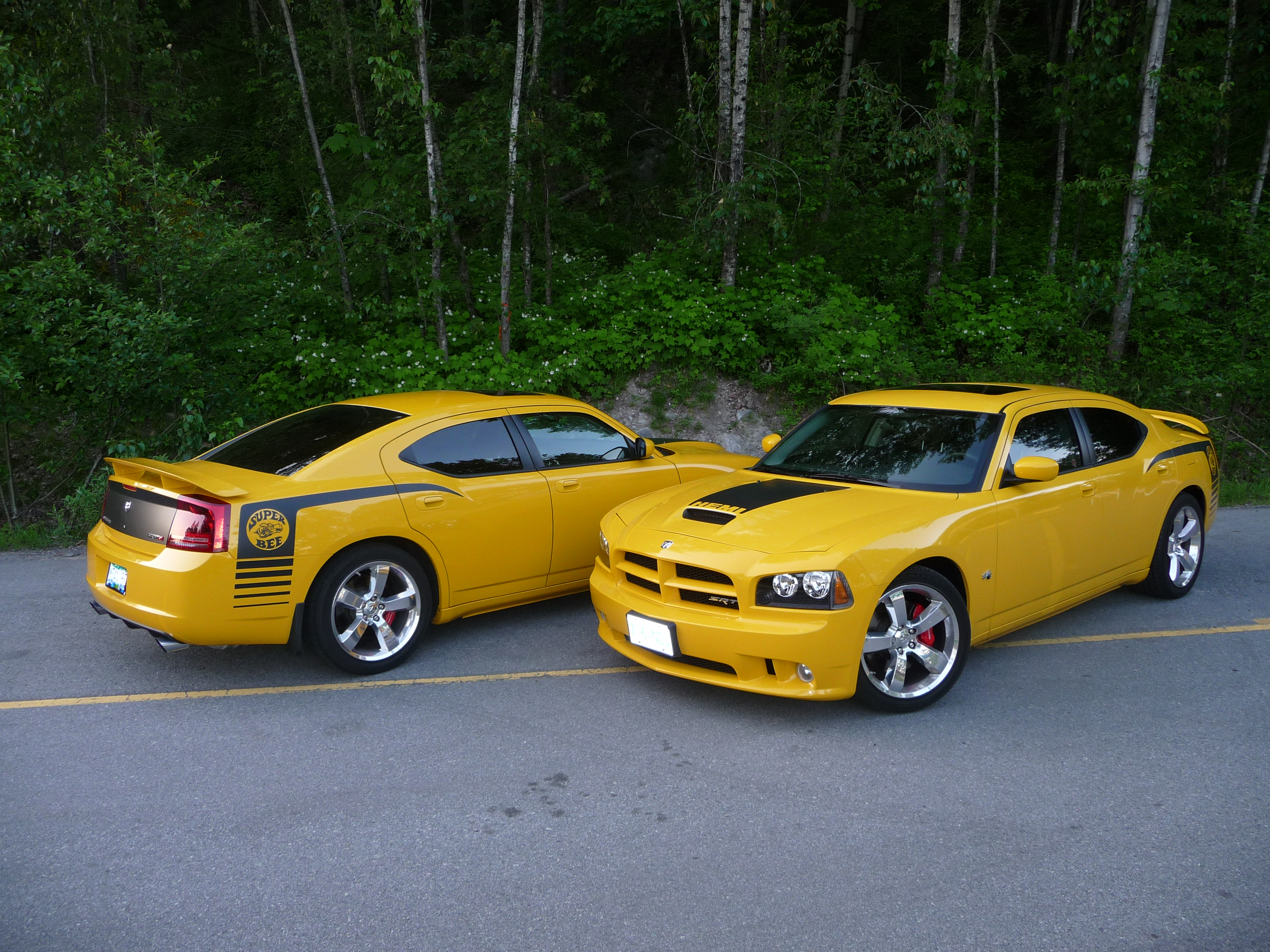
2007 Dodge SuperBee number 0004 of 1000 and 0427 of 1000

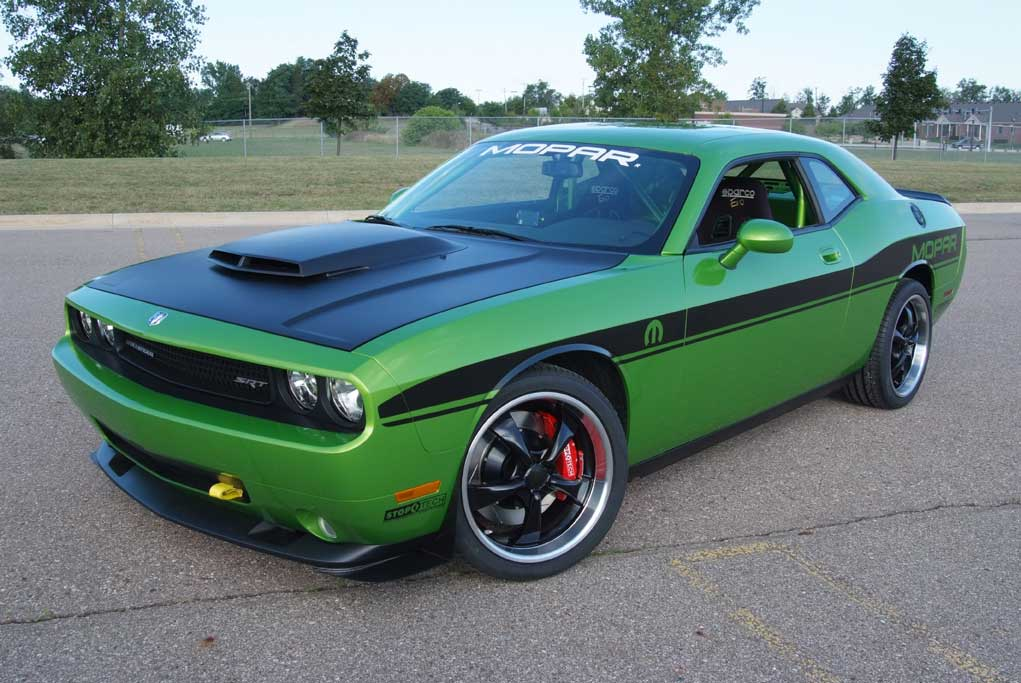
2009 Dodge Challenger

- 1988–1992 Eagle Premier
- 1990–1992 Dodge Monaco
- 1993–1997 Eagle Vision
- 1993–2004 Chrysler Concorde
- 1993–2004 Dodge Intrepid
- 1994–1996 Chrysler New Yorker
- 1994–2001 Chrysler LHS
- 1999–2004 Chrysler 300M
- 2005–2008 Dodge Magnum
- 2011–2014 Lancia Thema
- 2005–2023 Chrysler 300
- 2006–2023 Dodge Charger
- 2008–2023 Dodge Challenger

=== Annual production ===
- 1988 = 59,068
- 1989 = 33,904
- 1990 = 24,676
- 1991 = 18,133
- 1992 = 50,660
- 1993 = 256,754
- 1994 = 256,211
- 1995 = 188,782
- 1996 = 238,965
- 1997 = 204,137
- 1998 = 300,866
- 1999 = 338,921
- 2000 = 291,884
- 2001 = 198,965
- 2002 = 201,723
- 2003 = 140,642
- 2004 = 209,045
- 2005 = 318,536
- 2006 = 314,161
- 2007 = 273,285
- 2008 = 210,704
- 2009 = 121,715 (reduced numbers due to Chrysler's bankruptcy that Year)
- 2010 = 163,257
- 2011 = 194,631
- 2012 = 240,193
- 2013 = 244,771
- 2014 = 222,829
- 2015 = 253,230
- 2016 = 237,483
- 2017 = 231,816
- 2018 = 233,261
- 2019 = 202,447
- 2020 = 155,552 (reduced numbers due to COVID-19 pandemic)
- 2021 = 146,423 (reduced numbers due to global microchip shortage)
- 2022 = 165,819 (reduced numbers due to global microchip shortage)
- 2023 = 204,439

Total production through 2023 = 7,147,888
