= Gerald C. Meyers =

Automobile industry executive (1928–2023)

- Born: Gerald Carl Meyers; December 5, 1928; Buffalo, New York, U.S.
- Died: June 19, 2023 (aged 94); West Bloomfield, Michigan, U.S.
- Education: Carnegie Mellon University (BS, MS)
- Occupation: Auto executive
- Employer: American Motors Corporation
- Title: CEO
- Term: 1977–1982
- Spouse: Barbara Jacob (m. 1958; died 2009)
- Children: 3

External image
- * Gerald C. Meyers at azquotes * Gerald C. Meyers by the Detroit Free Press

Gerald Carl Meyers (December 5, 1928 – June 19, 2023) was an American industrialist, author, lecturer, and management consultant who was chairman and CEO of American Motors Corporation (AMC) from 1977 to 1982.

== Early life and career ==
Gerald Carl Meyers was born in 1928 to a Jewish family in Buffalo, New York. His father was a tailor who immigrated to the United States from Poland. His mother was an opera singer.

Meyers attended public schools in Buffalo, skipping two grades before graduating from Bennett High School in 1945. He briefly studied at Canisius College in Buffalo before transferring to the Carnegie Institute of Technology (now Carnegie Mellon University), where he obtained a Bachelor of Science in engineering in 1950, and a Master of Science magna cum laude in business in 1954.

Meyers joined the Ford Motor Company in 1950, but his work at the automaker was cut by military service. He was an officer in the U.S. Air Force during the Korean War, stationed in Greenland. Afterward, he worked for Chrysler Corporation. During the eight years with the automaker, he became Director of Manufacturing for the company's overseas plants in 1961 and lived in Geneva, Switzerland, for three years.

== American Motors ==
In 1962, Meyers was appointed director of purchasing for American Motors Corporation in Detroit, where he assumed a succession of executive roles. In charge of product development, Meyers introduced AMC's innovative "AMC Buyer Protection Plan" that included the industry's first 12-month or 12,000-mile (19,000 km) bumper-to-bumper warranty. The number of models was reduced to remove the basic, stripped versions, to simplify the variations produced. Nevertheless, the centerpiece was improved quality during the production. However, Meyers said, "I don't claim we've magically and finally licked all the problems of the assembly line." Other improvements included mechanical upgrades to increase durability and quality, as well as improved standard equipment levels. By 1973, Meyers was pushing the development of the Wankel engine for installation into an AMC car within two years, with the possibility of going independent of GM's rotary engineering work. Still, he ruled out AMC producing the new engine itself. While Meyers was AMC's top product man, he was "given considerable, and justifiable, credit for pushing the AMX/3 project from inception through the design and prototype stages into testing."

A significant management transition at AMC started on May 24, 1977. Meyers was named president and chief operating officer, succeeding the retiring William Luneburg. Although Meyers was the executive who had been against AMC's purchase of Jeep in 1970 (of which the press kept reminding him), he was now one of Jeep's most prominent proponents. Meyers did not have all the powers as Luneburg because he did not report to the CEO and chairman, Roy D. Chapin Jr., but to the vice-chairman of the board of directors, R. William McNeally, who was also a rival to be the next chairman.

Upon the retirement of Chapin on October 21, 1977, Meyers became chairman and chief executive officer. At the time, Meyers was 49 years old and became the youngest top executive in the automobile industry, bringing a wealth of manufacturing experience. "The company was looking for a lot more than a steady hand on the tiller – it was looking for a savior" but Meyers disagreed and argued that the company could survive and remain a factor in the automobile industry by abandoning its policy of head-on competition and instead focusing on and revamping its four-wheel-drive vehicles, a market segment left untended by the large automakers, and by acquiring advanced technology.

For fiscal 1977, AMC's profits more than doubled compared to the previous year to a record $83.9 million on sales of $3.1 billion. The smallest U.S. automaker saw its car sales increase 37%, while they dropped 21% for the industry as a whole. Meyers described AMC's strategy as a "three-legged stool" of small cars, Jeeps, and steady government and military contracts. By 1979, the automaker's management team headed by Meyers, ... "sharply cut back its money-losing car operations ... The perennially ailing baby of the auto industry suddenly looks healthy, and its new management team has a clear design for the future."

In 1979, Meyers partnered with the French state-owned Renault, which bought 22.5 percent of AMC stock. Because he engineered the deal with Renault, Meyers received the Cross of Chevalier of the French Legion of Honor in 1981 for "strengthening the fabric of Franco-American relations."

The U.S. economy continued to decline during President Reagan's Recession. At the start of 1982, AMC held on to only two percent of the domestic market and lost about $300 million during the previous two years. Meyers had acknowledged that AMC had no hope of raising the $6 billion it needed to finance more competitive products, stating "It would take dough that just isn't in the cards for us," so the company staked its future on help from Renault, which included development of the Renault Alliance sub-compact for production in Kenosha, Wisconsin. In early 1982, AMC asked its 16,000 hourly workers for wage concessions that would save the automaker $150 million.

At age 53, Meyers retired from the company in February 1982. By that time, Renault controlled 46 percent of American Motors. He was with the automaker for 20 years and was noted for orchestrating "the complicated linkup between AMC and Renault starting in 1979." Meyers was succeeded as chairman by AMC President W. Paul Tippett Jr. At the time, Tippett was a member of AMC management for only three years.

== Retirement ==
Meyers was the Ford Distinguished Research Chair and Professor of Business at Carnegie Mellon University's Graduate School of Industrial Administration. He has written a book about business crisis management and co-authored another. Meyers was a business consultant and public speaker with expertise in the auto industry and business administration. He was also a Visiting Professor of Organizational Behavior at the University of Michigan Ross School of Business from 1991 to 2017.

Meyers was also President of Gerald C. Meyers Associates, a management consulting firm that assists and advises senior corporate officers. An expert in corporate governance and crisis management, he was also a commentator on the automobile industry.

On April 17, 2007, he received an honorary degree, a doctorate of business practice, from Carnegie Mellon University.

== Personal life and death ==
Meyers married Barbara Jacob in 1958. They had three children and were together until she died in 2009. Meyers died at his home in West Bloomfield, Michigan, on June 19, 2023, at the age of 94.

== Author ==
Gerald C. Meyers wrote When It Hits the Fan, Managing the Nine Crises of Business, published by Houghton-Mifflin. He also co-authored Dealers, Healers, Brutes & Saviors, Eight Winning Styles for Solving Giant Business Crises with his daughter, Susan Meyers, published by John Wiley & Sons in 2000 providing examples of business people who were able to navigate their companies through major crises.

Business positions
Preceded by Roy D. Chapin Jr.	Chairman and CEO of American Motors; 1977–1982	Succeeded by W. Paul Tippett Jr.
