= W. Paul Tippett Jr. =

American businessman (1932–2015)

- Born: Willis Paul Tippett Jr. December 27, 1932; Crawfordsville, Indiana, U.S.
- Died: August 20, 2015 (aged 82); Panton, Vermont, U.S.
- Education: Wabash College
- Occupation: Former president of American Motors, Springs Industries, and STP
- Spouse: Carlotta Prichard (m. 1959)
- Children: 2

Willis Paul Tippett Jr. (December 27, 1932 – August 20, 2015) was an American business executive who was the president, chairman, and chief executive officer of the American Motors Corporation, president of Springs Industries, and president and CEO of STP.

== Early life ==
Tippett was born on December 27, 1932, in Crawfordsville, Indiana to Willis and Edna Tippett. Tippett graduated from Culver Military Academy and Wabash College. He starred in Wabash's production of Mister Roberts and was a member of the school's football and tennis teams. From 1978 to 1983 he was a member of the college's board of trustees.

Tippet was an intelligence officer in the United States Navy. On January 24, 1959, Tippett married Carlotta Prichard, daughter of General Vernon Prichard, at the Fort Myer chapel. They had two children.

== Career ==
After leaving the Navy, Tippett worked for Procter & Gamble. In 1964, Tippett joined Ford Motor Company's marketing department, where he rose to the position of director of marketing for Ford of Europe. In 1975, Tippett joined STP, an automotive aftermarket products company owned by the Studebaker-Packard Corporation, as an executive vice president. He was promoted to was president and CEO the following year, but left after only two months. He then served as an executive vice president of the Singer Corporation. In this role, Tippett headed the company's sewing products division.

On October 20, 1978, Tippett was named president of American Motors Corporation. As president, Tippett was the company's number two officer and oversaw almost all vehicle-making operations. In 1982, with AMC's partnership with Renault struggling to succeed, chairman and chief executive officer Gerald C. Meyers left the company and Tippett was promoted to replace him. In 1984, Tippett relinquished the CEO title to company president Jose Dedeurwaerder. On April 24, 1985, Tippett resigned as a company employee as part of a cost-cutting move. He remained chairman of the board until December 13, 1985, when he was replaced by Renault executive Pierre Semerena.

From 1985 to 1989, Tippett was president of Springs Industries.

== Later life ==
After leaving Springs Industries, Tippett served as chairman of the Council of Great Lake Industries, an alliance of U.S. and Canadian businesses.

In 1980, Tippett and his wife moved to Panton, Vermont, where he died on August 20, 2015.

Business positions
Preceded by Gerald C. Meyers	President of the American Motors Corporation; 1978–1982	Succeeded by Jose Dedeurwaerder
Preceded by Gerald C. Meyers	CEO of the American Motors Corporation; 1982–1984	Succeeded by Jose Dedeurwaerder
Preceded by Gerald C. Meyers	Chairman of the American Motors Corporation; 1982–1985	Succeeded by Pierre Semerena
