= List of shopping malls in Minnesota =

The following is a list of shopping centers located in the state of Minnesota. Minnesota is home to the first enclosed shopping mall in the United States, Southdale Center, as well as the largest in the country, Mall of America.

== Current ==
| Name | Location | Year opened | Gross leasable area sq ft / m^{2} | Owner |
|---|---|---|---|---|
| Albertville Premium Outlets | Albertville | 2000 | 430,000 square feet (40,000 m^{2}) | Simon Property Group |
| Apache Mall | Rochester | 1969 | 750,000 square feet (70,000 m^{2}) | Brookfield Properties Retail Group |
| Arbor Lakes | Maple Grove | 1997 | 1,262,000 square feet (120,000 m^{2}) | Arbor Lakes Building Association |
| Burnsville Center | Burnsville | 1977 | 1,100,000 square feet (100,000 m^{2}) | CBL & Associates Properties |
| Central Park Commons | Eagan | 2016 | 434,000 square feet (40,000 m^{2}) | American Realty Advisors |
| Cray Plaza | St. Paul | 1986 | 192,000 square feet (18,000 m^{2}) | CBRE Group |
| Crossroads Center | St. Cloud | 1966 | 890,000 square feet (83,000 m^{2}) | Brookfield Properties Retail Group |
| Eden Prairie Center | Eden Prairie | 1976 | 1,136,421 square feet (110,000 m^{2}) | Cypress Equities |
| Gaviidae Common | Minneapolis | 1989 | 609,368 square feet (57,000 m^{2}) | Brookfield Properties |
| The Grove | Maple Grove | 2005 | 538,000 square feet (50,000 m^{2}) | Hempel Properties |
| Har Mar Mall | Roseville | 1961 | 460,000 square feet (43,000 m^{2}) | Vanbarton Group LLC |
| Mall of America | Bloomington | 1992 | 4,870,000 square feet (450,000 m^{2}) | Triple Five Group |
| Maplewood Mall | Maplewood | 1974 | 931,000 square feet (86,000 m^{2}) | Brookwood Capital Partners |
| Midtown Square Mall | St. Cloud | 1982 | 181,500 square feet (17,000 m^{2}) | Quality Investments Inc. |
| Miller Hill Mall | Duluth | 1973 | 833,000 square feet (77,000 m^{2}) | Simon Property Group |
| Northtown Mall | Blaine | 1972 | 621,109 square feet (58,000 m^{2}) | WP Glimcher |
| Paul Bunyan Mall | Bemidji | 1977 | 297,803 square feet (28,000 m^{2}) | Lexington Realty International |
| Ridgedale Center | Minnetonka | 1974 | 1,105,337 square feet (100,000 m^{2}) | Brookfield Properties Retail Group |
| River Hills Mall | Mankato | 1991 | 814,000 square feet (76,000 m^{2}) | Brookfield Properties Retail Group |
| Riverdale Village | Coon Rapids | 1999 | 968,867 square feet (90,000 m^{2}) | North American Development Group |
| Rosedale Center | Roseville | 1969 | 1,149,487 square feet (110,000 m^{2}) | Jones Lang LaSalle |
| Seven Points (previously Calhoun Square) | Minneapolis | 1983 | 170,520 square feet (16,000 m^{2}) | Ackerberg Design |
| Shingle Creek Crossing (previously Brookdale Center) | Brooklyn Center | 2012 | 652,000 square feet (61,000 m^{2}) | Gatlin Development Company |
| Shoppes at Knollwood (previously Knollwood Mall) | St. Louis Park | 1955 | 456,554 square feet (42,000 m^{2}) | Gateway Knollwood, LLC |
| Shops at Gateway North (previously North Branch Outlets) | North Branch | 1992 | 134,480 square feet (12,000 m^{2}) | Starwood Property Trust |
| The Shops at West End | St. Louis Park | 2009 | 348,541 square feet (32,000 m^{2}) | American Realty Capital |
| Southdale Center | Edina | 1956 | 1,300,000 square feet (120,000 m^{2}) | Simon Property Group |
| Southtown Center | Bloomington | 1960 | 534,650 square feet (50,000 m^{2}) | Kraus-Anderson, Inc. |
| Twin Cities Premium Outlets | Eagan | 2014 | 408,930 square feet (38,000 m^{2}) | Simon Property Group |
| Ultra Outlets of Medford (previously Medford Outlet Center) | Medford | 1991 | 223,660 square feet (21,000 m^{2}) | Ultra Outlets USA |
| Uptown Virginia (previously Thunderbird Mall) | Virginia | 1971 | 285,680 square feet (27,000 m^{2}) | RockStep Capital |
| Uptown Willmar (previously Kandi Mall) | Willmar | 1973 | 452,381 square feet (42,000 m^{2}) | RockStep Capital |
| Woodbury Lakes | Woodbury | 2005 | 361,599 square feet (34,000 m^{2}) | Ramco-Gershenson Properties Trust |

== Former ==
| Name | Location | Year opened | Year closed | Gross leasable area sq ft / m^{2} | Former owner |
|---|---|---|---|---|---|
| Apache Plaza | St. Anthony | 1961 | 2004 | | |
| Brookdale Center | Brooklyn Center | 1962 | 2010 | | |
| Four Seasons Mall | Plymouth | 1978 | 2012 | 117,000 square feet (11,000 m^{2}) | INH Properties |
| Marktplatz Mall; Opened around 1980 as a downtown enclosed mall intended to strengthen New Ulm's central retail district and prevent the development of an edge-of-town mall. The project was built and managed by Ryan Development, with hopes of connecting the mall directly to Minnesota Street businesses; however, only Herberger's fully connected to the mall and served as its north anchor. Plans for another major anchor, such as JCPenney or Sears, never materialized, and the mall struggled with timing, limited tenant connections, competition from larger malls, and the decline of small retailers. Over time, stores closed one by one and the mall became increasingly vacant. It ceased retail operations in 2018 after Herberger's was liquidated, and the building sat empty for years. EBMD LLC acquired two of the three mall parcels in 2020 and the final center section in 2023. A November 2024 fire damaged the northwest section and caused smoke damage throughout the vacant building, but the structure was not reported damaged and apartment redevelopment plans continued. In 2026, New Ulm sought a DEED redevelopment grant for the site, with plans to demolish the top level and rebuild the property as an apartment building. | New Ulm | 1980 | 2018 | | Ryan Development; later EBMD LLC |
| Moorhead Center Mall; Opened in 1973 as part of Moorhead's downtown urban renewal project, which replaced parts of the older downtown with a mall-centered redevelopment. The mall originally had 44,000 square feet and seven tenants, using a condominium ownership model in which store owners owned their spaces while the city maintained the public areas. By 2023, Roers owned more than 90% of the mall and announced that operations would cease by December 31, 2023; demolition began in 2024 and continued into 2025 as the site was redeveloped as The Loop. | Moorhead | 1973 | 2023 | 44,000 square feet (4,100 m²) | Condominium ownership; Roers owned more than 90% by 2023 |
| Wayzata Bay Center | Wayzata | 1967 | 2011 | 127,000 square feet (12,000 m^{2}) | United Properties |
