= Shoppers World =

Shoppers World or Shopper's World may refer to:

in Canada

- Shoppers World Brampton, in Brampton, Ontario, Canada
  - Shoppers World Terminal, a Brampton Transit bus station
- Shoppers World Danforth and Shoppers World Albion (now the Albion Centre), in Toronto, Ontario, Canada

in the United States

- Shopper's World, a strip mall on the site of Shoppers' World, one of the first suburban malls in the U.S.
- Shoppers World (retail chain), a chain of discount department stores.
