= Brampton Assembly (AMC) =

Former Canadian automobile assembly plant

Brampton Assembly Plant
- Built: 1960
- Operated: 26 January 1962 – 4 April 1992.
- Location: Kennedy Road; Brampton, Ontario
- Coordinates: 43.678°N 79.722°W
- Industry: Automotive
- Products: Automobiles
- Area: 90 acres (36.4 ha)
- Owners: American Motors (1962–1987); Chrysler (1987–1992)
- Defunct: 1992; 34 years ago

The Brampton Assembly Plant is a former automobile manufacturing facility in Brampton, Ontario, initially owned and operated by initially owned and operated by American Motors Corporation (AMC). The factory began production in 1962, making over 1.2 million AMC and Jeep vehicles through the automaker's acquisition by Chrysler in 1987, until it was closed in 1992.

Chrysler sold the factory to Walmart for use as a warehouse. The buildings were eventually demolished in the 2000s when the site was redeveloped into a power centre that includes a Lowe's Home Improvement store.

== History ==
The factory was built at the corner of Steeles Avenue and Kennedy Road for American Motors Canada, Inc., which relocated operations from the old Danforth assembly plant (now Shoppers World Danforth) - which also previously served as the Canadian production site of the Ford Model T and Model A - to Peel-Elder's new "Peel Village" neighborhood in Brampton. The facility produced its first Rambler Classic on 26 January 1961.

The facility was composed of an assembly plant, parts warehouse, and engine plant, with an annual capacity of over 50,000 vehicles while employing 1,100 hourly and 500 salaried workers. The Rambler Classic was built on a line speed of 32 cars per shift. The facility was soon producing 33,000 cars annually in Canada. This assembly plant produced Rambler Americans, AMC Rebels, and later, Hornets, Concords, Gremlins, Spirits, and Eagles.

A long rail spur was built south from Canadian National Railway's busy Halton Sub mainline to service the plant. Peel had a yard, storage, and runaround tracks used for storing autoracks and auto parts cars that were needed by the factory and other local industries. New automobiles were loaded onto the autoracks with ramps for rail shipment at the plant.

With minimal Canadian production before 1965, American Motors was in the best position of the U.S. automakers to take advantage of the Canada–United States Automotive Products Agreement. This plant also allowed AMC to export cars within Commonwealth countries at a favorable tariff rate, making AMC the number one U.S. nameplate in markets such as Trinidad and Jamaica in the 1960s. The assembly of Ambassador models was moved to Kenosha, Wisconsin while production of Ramblers and Rebels increased. By 1969, the output of AMC's Brampton operation was destined for the eastern half of the continent, while Kenosha supplied the western regions.

In 1977, AMC hired the first female assembly worker, Cecilia Palmer, who became Canadian Auto Workers Local 1285's first sister. The organization is now named Unifor Local 1285.

Passenger car assembly was moved from Brampton to Kenosha in 1978, and this allowed AMC to expand production of its popular Jeep CJ-5 and CJ-7 models.

As Renault increased control of AMC since 1979, the future of the old Brampton facility was in jeopardy by 1982. Renault's strategic business plan was to limit production of AMC cars to Kenosha and Jeeps to Toledo as part of efforts to gain economies of scale. Moreover, local production was no longer a prerequisite for duty-free access into the Canadian market as long as the car's Canadian-sourced parts content met a minimum ratio to the total value of its sales in Canada.

Discussions to possibly utilize the assembly plant's capacity with Nissan ended in 1986, while at the time, AMC's president, Jose Dedeurwaerder, a former Renault executive, made an "ominous" statement that the automaker was openly looking for a partner.

Chrysler acquires AMC and the Jeep brand in 1987

In 1987, with the Chrysler buyout, AMC's Canadian division and its plants (Brampton and Bramalea) were absorbed into Chrysler, becoming part of Chrysler Canada Limited. At the time of Chrysler's purchase, the combined full production capacity of the four AMC assembly plants (Brampton, Kenosha, Toledo, and the brand-new Bramalea Assembly in Brampton) had a combined annual total production capacity of around 700,000 vehicles. This meant overcapacity for Chrysler, and AMC's old Kenosha and Toledo factories were at the top of Chrysler's closure list.

During 1987, assembly of the legacy AMC Eagle cars ended while production of the new Jeep Wrangler (YJ) model was moved from Jeep's historic Toledo factory. Although the CJ was assembled in many other countries, this was the only time the manufacture of the CJ or Wrangler vehicles was centered outside the U.S.

The workers in Toledo agreed to concessions to keep the Ohio factory open, but by 1990, they were also pitted against those at Brampton Assembly. Additional concessions by the Toledo employees were critical for Chrysler in deciding to close the original Brampton facility. The old Brampton factory continued building the Wrangler through the 1992 model year after which the facility was shut, and the Jeeps were assembled in Toledo.

With this transfer and closure, AMC's new Bramalea Assembly plant (that was opened in 1986) was renamed the Brampton Assembly. The facility was designed by AMC to assemble the all-new full-sized Eagle Premier which was produced under Chrysler until 1997. Afterwards, the facility and began making the new large Chrysler LH platform models (Chrysler Concorde, Dodge Intrepid, and Eagle Vision). These were followed by the Chrysler LHS and New Yorker as well as the 1999 model year 300M.

== Legacy ==
The original Brampton AMC factory was closed on 4 April 1992 by Chrysler. The 90-acre (36.4 ha) property was sold to Wal-Mart for use as one of their Canadian warehouses. The remains of the plant's west buildings were torn down in 2005, and the land was redeveloped for commercial/retail use. Among the buildings on the site is a Lowe's home improvement store that opened on 10 December 2007, as one of the first three to be established by the retail chain in Canada. The old factory's east building was demolished in 2007, and a Walmart Supercentre (15 Resolution Dr.) occupies the site since 2014.

Rambler Drive, a street to the west of the plant leading into the "Peel Village" neighbourhood off Kennedy, serves as a reminder of AMC's former presence in the area. The Village was the first planned community that combined residential, commercial, and industrial uses.

== Annual production ==
American Motors' original Brampton production and products for model years (MY) from 1961 through 1992:

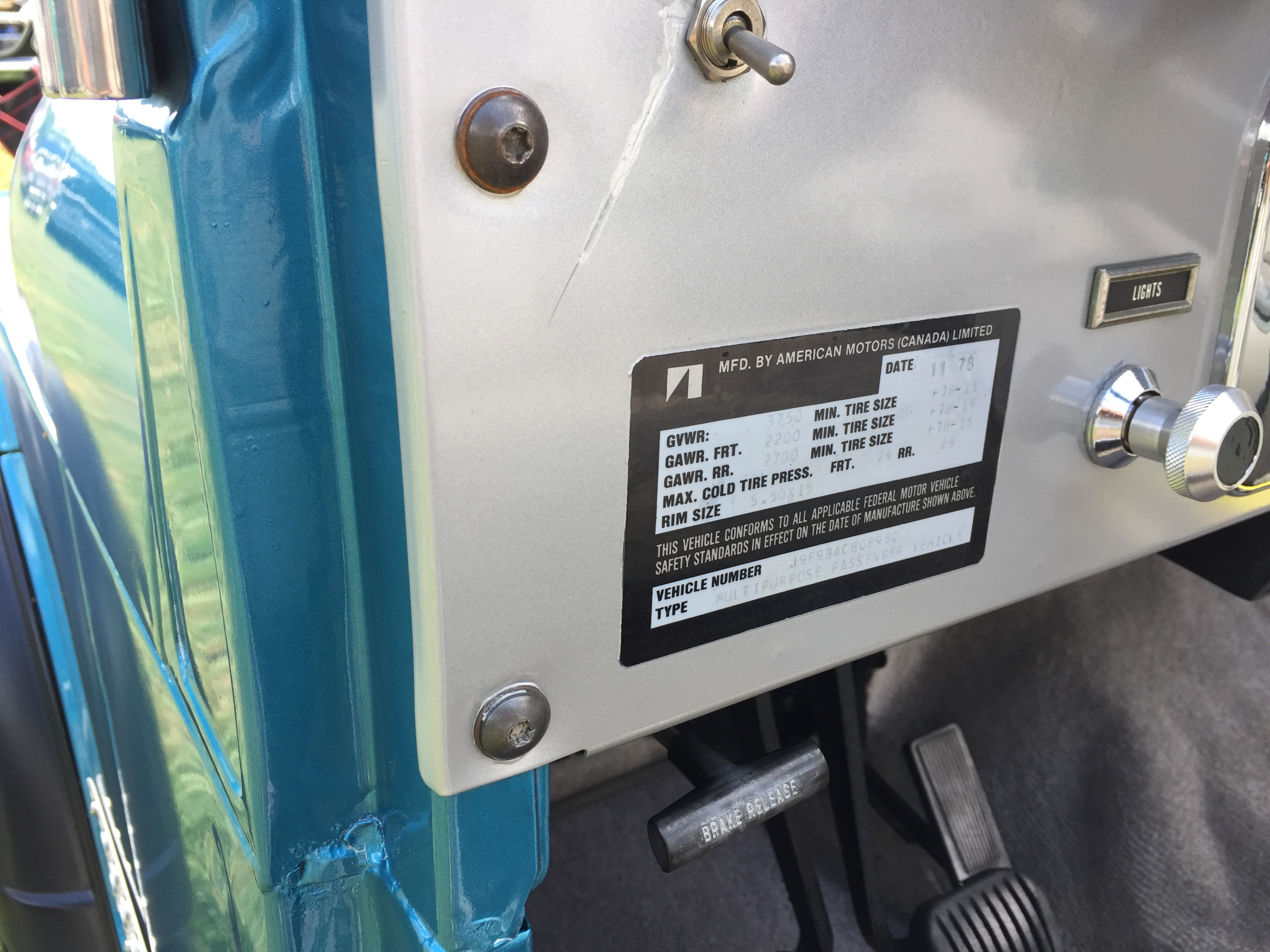
1979 Jeep CJ-7 manufactured November 1978 at AMC's Brampton Assembly

Year	Model	Units	MY totals
1961	Rambler Classic	4,168	4,168
1962	Rambler American	5,050	
	Rambler Classic	12,297	17,347
1963	Rambler American	5,308	
	Rambler Classic	18,941	
	Rambler Ambassador	3,242	27,491
1964	Rambler American	11,860	
	Rambler Classic	19,247	
	Rambler Ambassador	1,877	32,984
1965	Rambler American	9,391	
	Rambler Classic	18,264	
	Rambler Ambassador	6,893	34,548
1966	Rambler American	9,314	
	Rambler Classic	11,606	
	AMC Ambassador	7,852	28,772
1967	Rambler American	5,434	
	AMC Rebel	15,836	
	AMC Ambassador	10,125	31,395
1968	Rambler American	25,296	
	AMC Rebel	9,718	
	AMC Ambassador	6,413	41,427
1969	American	24,185	
	AMC Rebel	15,529	38,714
1970	AMC Hornet	36,408	
	AMC Gremlin	3,260	
	AMC Rebel	3,581	43,249
1971	AMC Hornet	17,666	
	AMC Gremlin	23,428	41,094
1972	AMC Hornet	18,650	
	AMC Gremlin	33,091	57,741
1973	AMC Hornet	32,331	
	AMC Gremlin	37,663	69,994
1974	AMC Hornet	43,150	
	AMC Gremlin	39,223	82,373
1975	AMC Hornet	21,848	
	AMC Gremlin	10,163	32,011
1976	AMC Hornet	35,204	
	AMC Gremlin	14,422	49,626
1977	AMC Hornet	21,218	
	AMC Gremlin	19,166	40,284
1978	AMC Concord	41,017	
	AMC Gremlin	4,211	45,228
1979	Jeep CJ-5	20,913	
	Jeep CJ-7	30,684	51,597
1980	Jeep CJ-5	12,050	
	Jeep CJ-7	17,993	30,043
1981	AMC Concord	10,441	
	AMC Eagle	10,347	20,788
1982	AMC Concord	10,117	
	AMC Eagle	20,900	31,017
1983	AMC Concord	14,277	
	AMC Spirit	1,689	
	AMC Eagle	10,424	
	AMC Eagle SX/4	5,398	31,788
1984	AMC Eagle	25,535	
	AMC Eagle SX/4	1	25,536
1985	AMC Eagle	16,866	16,866
1986	AMC Eagle	8,217	8,217
1987	AMC Eagle	4,996	
	Jeep Wrangler	44,517	49,513
1988	Eagle Wagon *	2,305	
	Jeep Wrangler	46,130	48,435
1989	Jeep Wrangler	71,025	71,025
1990	Jeep Wrangler	57,451	57,451
1991	Jeep Wrangler	57,241	57,241
1992	Jeep Wrangler	82,015	82,015
1961-1992	Production total		1,280,078

* Note: For the 1988 model year, the name of the AMC Eagle was changed by Chrysler to "Eagle Wagon", with only the station wagon variant produced. The final AMC-branded car (not Jeep), a 1988 AMC Eagle, was built on 11 December 1987, and shipped from Brampton on 15 December to a dealer in the United States.
