= Uptown Scottsbluff =

- Location: Scottsbluff, Nebraska, United States
- Coordinates: 41°52′11.72″N 103°38′58.69″W
- Address: 2302 Frontage Rd
- Opened: August 1986
- Previous names: Monument Mall
- Owner: RockStep Capital
- Num. of stores: 46
- Floors: 1
- Website: https://uptownscottsbluff.com/

Uptown Scottsbluff is a shopping mall in Scottsbluff, Nebraska along US-26, previously known as Monument Mall. The mall was built in the mid-1980s with three different anchor stores. It was purchased by RockStep Capital in 2013, with plans to redevelop the mall. Today, about twenty-eight tenants occupy the mall including Harbor Freight, Dunham's Sports, Hobby Lobby, Dollar Tree, and Golden Ticket Cinemas Reel Lux 6.

== History ==
Opening in August 1986, the Monument Mall began with three anchor stores including Walmart, JCPenney, and Herberger's. The mall was built using features that can be seen in other 1980s-built malls around the United States, and it uses a similar footprint to the Hilltop Mall in Kearney, Nebraska which also once included Walmart and Herbergers as anchors.

Throughout the 90s, the mall was owned by Dial Realty Inc. which in 1994, changed its name to Mid-America Realty Investments Inc. in an effort to grow the company. The company owned several shopping malls and plazas across Nebraska including Imperial Mall in Hastings, and Stockyards Plaza in Omaha.

Walmart relocated to a new standalone location, leaving the previous Monument Mall location vacant since 2002.

Sears opened a Hometown store in the mall and moved out, but moved back to the mall in 2013. before closing in 2015. It would later be replaced by a gym called CrossFit Scottsbluff.

JCPenney closed at the Monument Mall in 2012. In the following year, RockStep Capital purchased the property with plans of redeveloping the mall. This process includes four phases, starting with the mall and working outward; the neighboring Kmart is labeled as the fourth phase.

In 2015, Dunham's Sports opened in the southern portion of the former Walmart anchor which shares the interior mall entry. Shortly thereafter, Hobby Lobby opened next door to Dunham's also in the former Walmart anchor. This left the former Walmart with only one remaining small tenant space in the northeast corner of the building.

Herberger's parent company, Bon-Ton Stores Inc., filed for Chapter 11 bankruptcy in 2018. The Scottsbluff Herbergers was one of 250 stores owned by Bon-Ton Stores Inc. expected to close that year on August 29.

Harbor Freight Tools opened in 2019 in the southernmost portion of the former Herbergers. Around the same time, Planet Bounce Family Fun Center relocated back to the former JCPenney space. Later in the same year, Dollar Tree opened a location next to Hobby Lobby, taking over the remaining vacant space that used to also make up the former Walmart anchor.

The Monument Mall rebranded to Uptown Scottsbluff in 2020 in part to shift away from using the word, "mall" in the name. This is part of a major rebranding taking place across many of RockStep Capital's properties including Uptown Christiansburg, Uptown Meridian, and Uptown Virginia.

In early 2023, RockStep Capital would sell the neighboring Kmart building to Scottsbluff KM Redevelopment, LLC. The same year, plans were announced for another occupant of the former Herbergers space although the exact name of the occupant hasn't officially been released.
