= Power center (retail) =

Large American shopping center

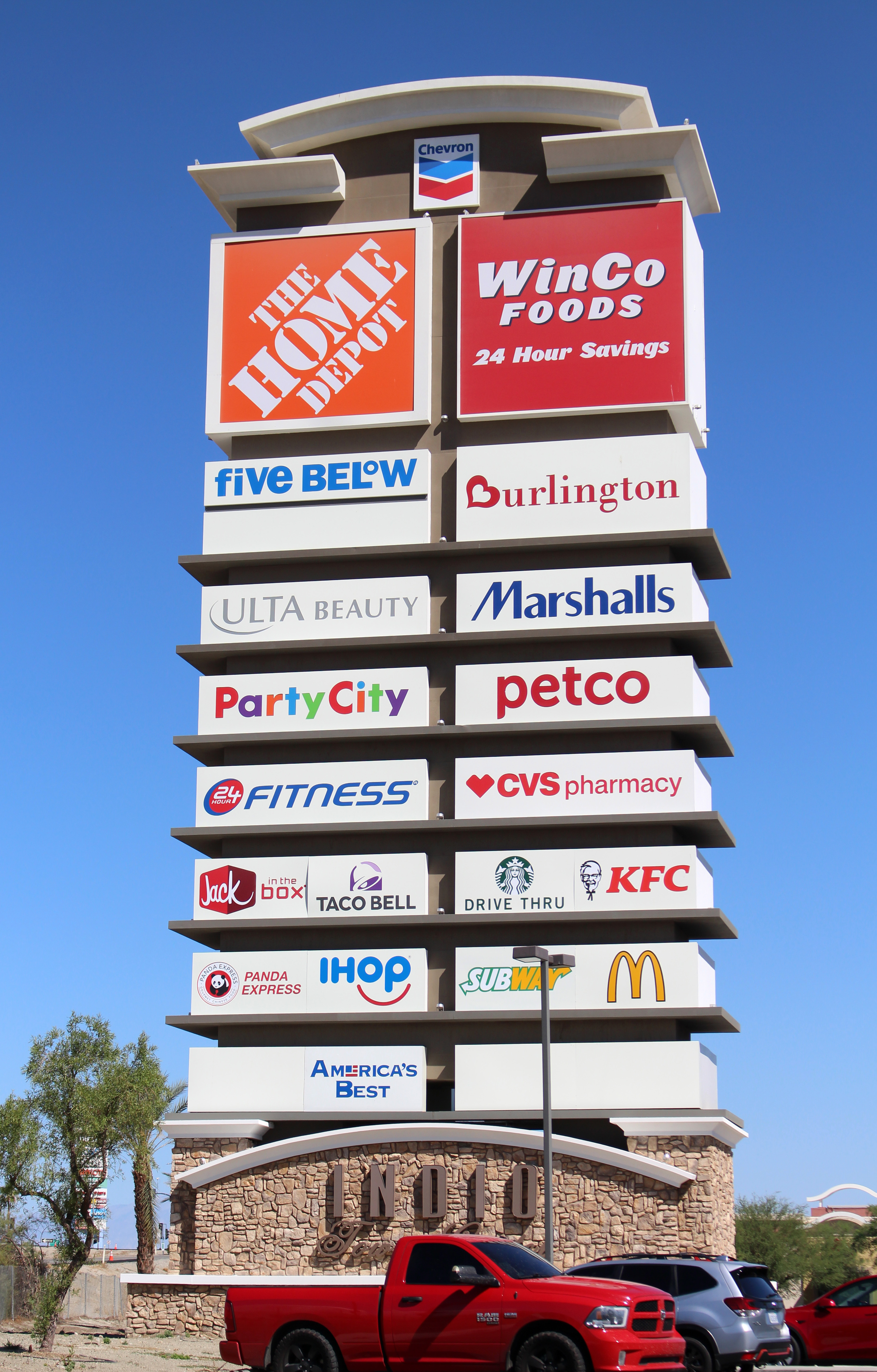
Power centers often list their anchor tenants on tall roadside signs, like this one at Indio Towne Center in Indio, California.

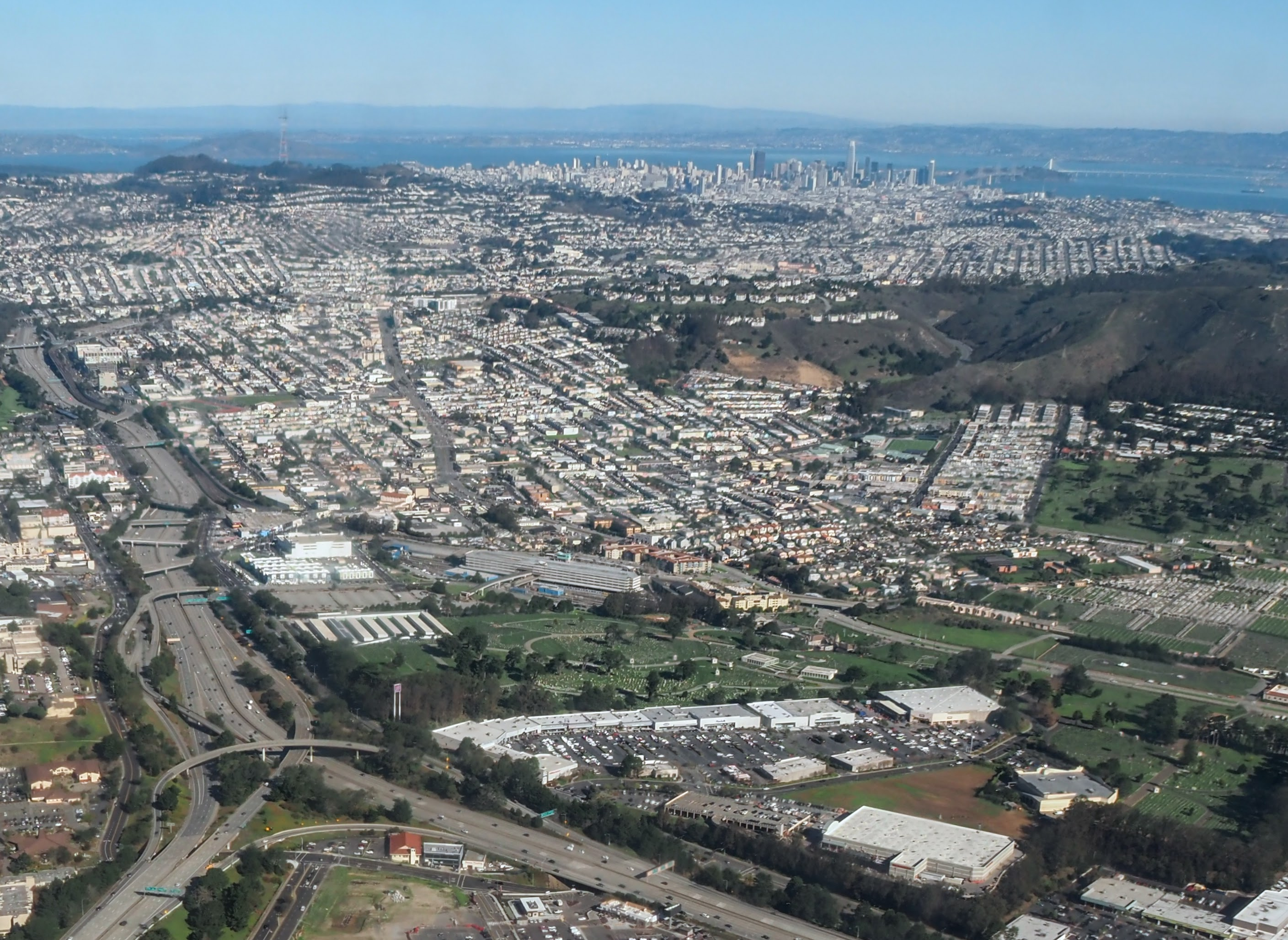
Aerial view of 280 Metro Center (at bottom), showing location relative to San Francisco

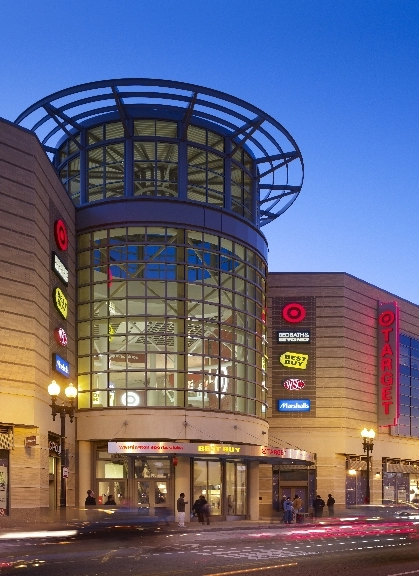
DC USA, a vertical power center in Washington, D.C.

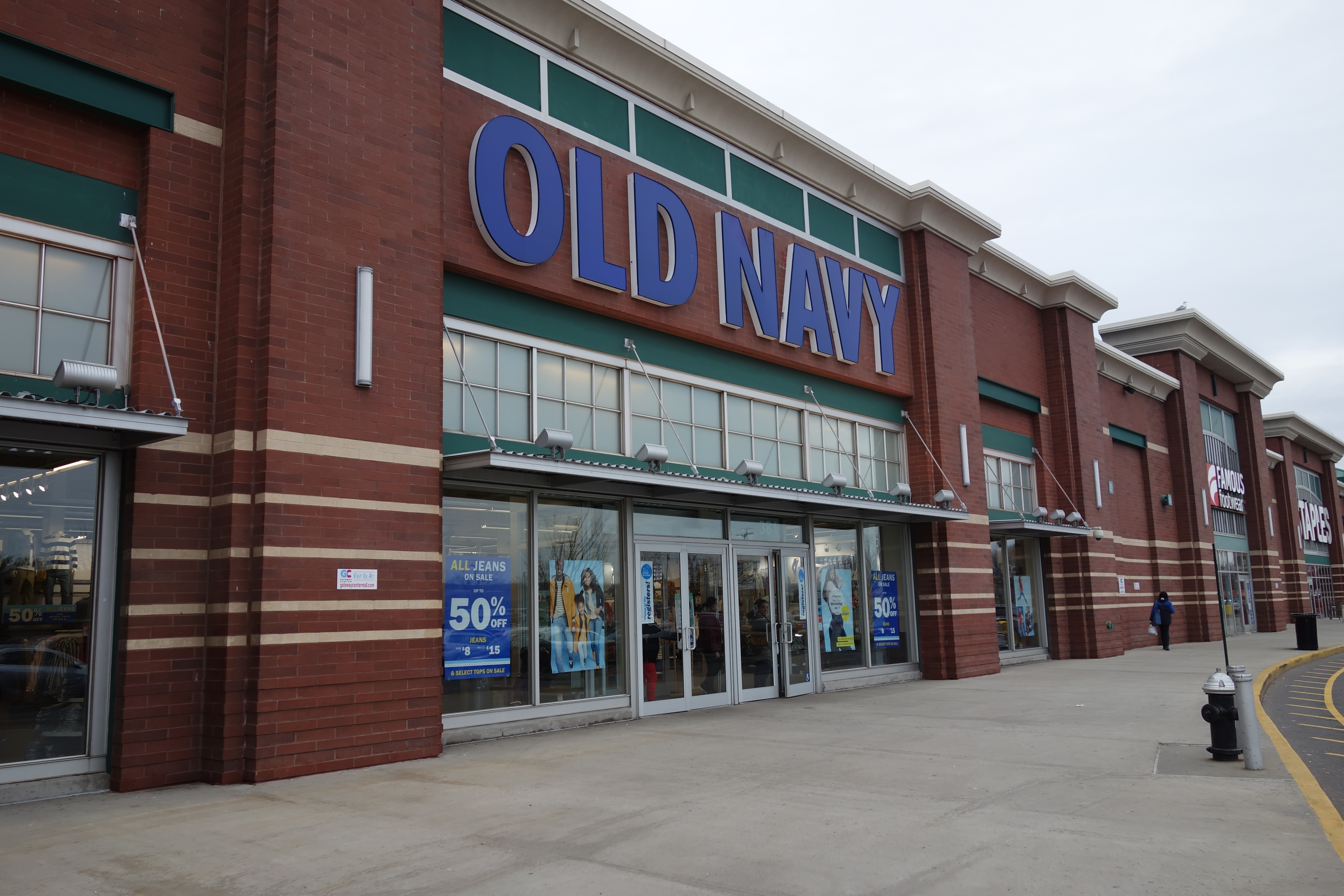
Big-box store entrances in Gateway Center, Brooklyn

A power center or big-box center (known in Commonwealth English as power centre or big-box centre) is a shopping center development typically ranging from 250,000 to 600,000 square feet (23,000 to 56,000 m^{2}) of gross leasable area that usually contains three or more big box anchor tenants and various smaller retailers, where the anchors occupy 75–90% of the total area.

== History ==
280 Metro Center in Colma, California is credited as the world's first power center. In 1986, local real estate developer Merritt Sher opened 280 Metro Center next to Interstate 280 as an open-air strip shopping center dominated by big-box stores and category killers. As originally constructed, 280 Metro Center featured 363,000 square feet (33,700 m^{2}) of gross leasable area on a 33-acre (13.3 ha) lot, which was home to seven anchor tenants, 27 smaller shops, and a six-screen movie theater. The original seven anchors were Federated Electronics, The Home Depot, Herman's Sporting Goods, Marshalls, Nordstrom Rack, Pier 1, and The Wherehouse.

In news coverage at the time, the phrase "power center" was treated as yet another example of the 1980s fad of forming buzzwords based on the word "power", along with power suits, power ties, and power walking. It is not clear who coined the phrase, but Sher's real estate development company, Terranomics, was happy to take credit for the concept by trademarking the phrase "originator of the power center".

280 Metro Center was a revolutionary development at a time when retail shopping in North America was dominated by enclosed shopping malls. Dissatisfied with long hikes through shopping malls to visit relatively small boutique tenants, American shoppers flocked to power centers where they could conveniently park directly in front of big-box stores. Power centers usually have a parking area next to the entrance of each anchor and a high parking ratio, as high as six spaces per 1,000 square feet (93 m^{2}) of gross leasable area. Thanks to such generous and convenient parking, the average visit length as of 1993 for a typical power center visitor was only 45 minutes, compared to three hours in a regional mall and four hours in a super-regional mall. Because their gigantic anchor tenants are each destinations in their own right, power center developers claim that 85 percent of their shoppers buy something on each visit, as opposed to 50 percent of mall shoppers. Power center developers usually recruit national chain stores as anchors, and in turn, the steady flow of customers and revenue resulting from consumer familiarity with such brand names helps such developers secure financing.

American consumers also found much lower prices at the stores in power centers, due to their relatively simple design, low overhead, and cheap rent. As of June 1995, a typical shopping mall tenant had to pay average monthly rent of $18 to $24 per square foot for their own space. Because it is far more difficult to build, decorate, maintain, and secure a multilevel shopping mall with skylights, lengthy interior corridors, and attached parking garages, mall tenants also had to pay an additional $8 to $12 in monthly common-area fees for each square foot of rented space. The comparable average monthly numbers per square foot for a typical power center tenant in the same timeframe were only $10 to $18 in rent and $3 in common-area fees, since a power center is merely a group of single-level warehouse-like structures gathered around a common open-air parking lot. Power centers have much lower costs than traditional enclosed regional malls for maintenance, heating, ventilation, and air conditioning (HVAC), electricity, and security for common areas.

These dual attractions of convenience and affordability drew American consumers by the millions to power centers during the 1990s. Shoppers from 51% of American households visited a power center in 1994, and for those households, the average number of power center visits that year was 19.5. By 1998, there were 313 power centers in the United States with a combined gross leasable area of 266,000,000 square feet (24,700,000 m^{2}). Together they accounted for over 5% of national shopping center sales. The highest numbers of power centers were in the states of California and Florida. By January 2017, there were 2,258 power centers in the United States with a combined gross leasable area of 990,416,000 square feet (92,012,700 m^{2}), which was 13% of the combined gross leasable area of all shopping centers in the United States.

== Canada ==
In Canada, South Edmonton Common in Edmonton is the largest power centre, and one of the largest open-air retail developments in North America. Spread over 320 acres (1.3 km^{2}), South Edmonton Common has more than 2,300,000 sq ft (210,000 m^{2}) of gross leasable area.

== European terminology ==
In Europe, any shopping center with mostly what are called "retail warehouse units" (U.K.) or "big box stores" or "superstores" (U.S.), 5,000 square metres (54,000 sq ft) or larger, is a retail park, according to the leading real estate company Cushman & Wakefield. According to a 2003 UK book on retail property locations, the United Kingdom did not have any power centers, but "the nearest British equivalent to the power centre is the large retail park."

According to ICSC, what in Europe is classified as a "retail park" would, in the U.S., be classified thus:

- Power center – 250,000 to 600,000 square feet (23,000 to 56,000 m^{2}), typically anchored by category-killer big box stores (e.g. Best Buy) including discount department stores (e.g. Target) and wholesale clubs (e.g. Costco)
- Neighborhood shopping center – 30,000 to 125,000 square feet (2,800 to 11,600 m^{2}) of gross leasable area, typically anchored by a supermarket and/or large drugstore

== Main Street theme ==
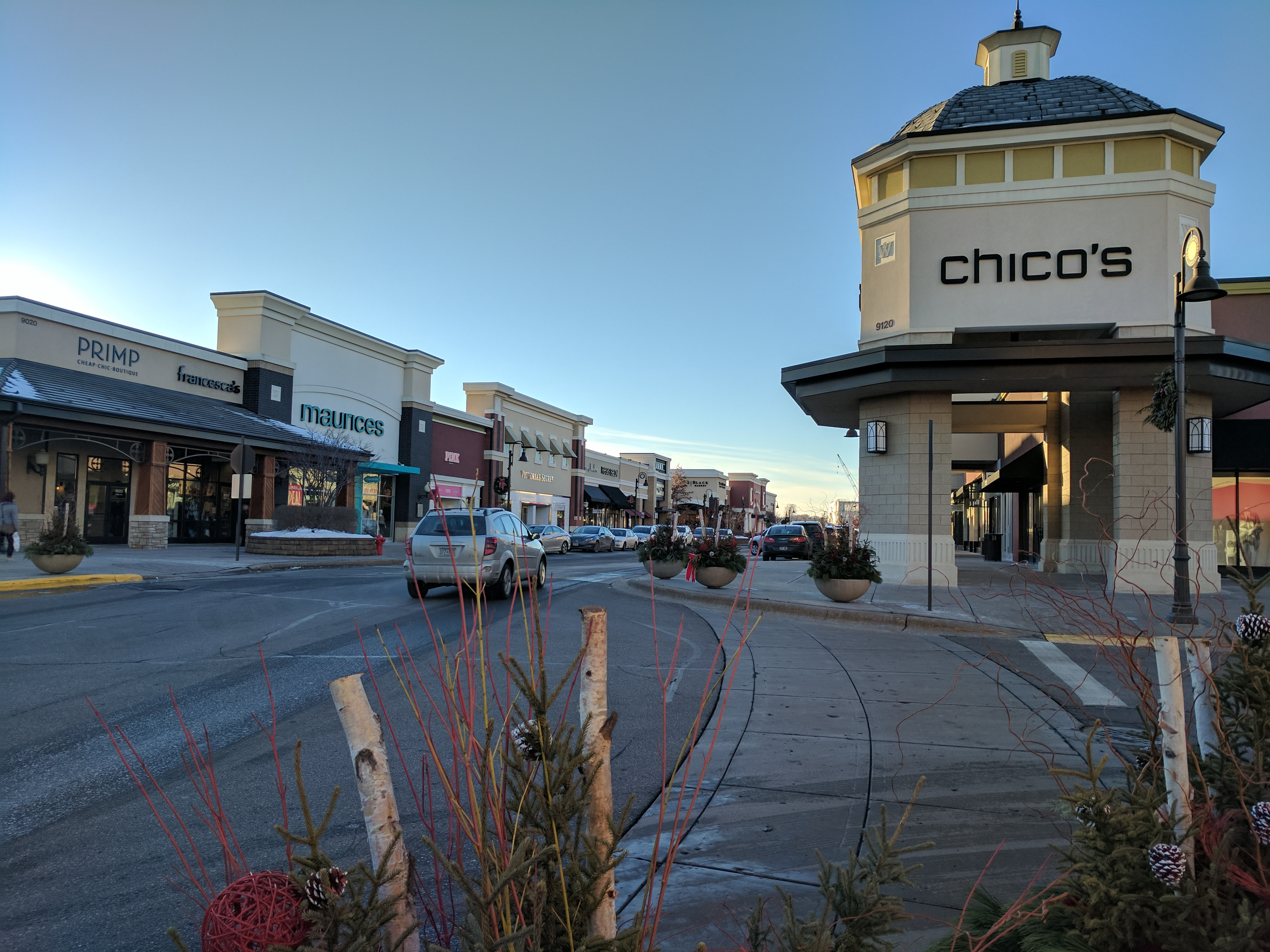
Woodbury Lakes outside of Minneapolis, a "Main Street" in the middle of a power center

Some new power center developments have attempted, as have lifestyle centers and regional outdoor malls (e.g. Otay Ranch Town Center, Atlantic Station), to recreate the atmosphere of an old-town Main Street. Stores line streets where cars may drive and where there is limited parking, with much more parking in lots or garages in the back. The "main street" particularly serves to house the smaller stores and chain stores once typically found in malls. An example is Woodbury Lakes in Woodbury, Minnesota—where, according to urbanist website streets.mn, the developers "dispensed with the integrated anchors and instead plopped down 'Main Street' in the middle of what is otherwise a regional power center".

== Vertical power centers ==
Power centers are almost always in suburban areas, but occasionally redevelopment has brought them to densely populated urban areas. In environments where denser development is desirable, a power center may consist of multiple floors, with one or more big-box anchors on each floor, and floors of parking, all "stacked" vertically. Examples of such centers include:

- City Point (Brooklyn)
- Dadeland Station (Miami)
- DC USA, Washington, D.C.
- Ellsworth Place, Silver Spring, Maryland, just outside the Washington, D.C. city limits, six levels
- Patio Santa Fe (Santa Fe, Mexico City)
- The Tenor, formerly 10 Dundas East, Toronto

== Repurposing malls as power centers ==
In recent years, it has become common for older, traditional shopping malls to:

- Become hybrid malls and power centers, where some or all anchors are big box stores, and the mall shops are still mostly national chains typically found in malls. Example: Panorama Mall in Los Angeles, anchored by Walmart and Curacao big box discount stores.
- Add outside but adjacent areas with big-box stores and/or strip mall-type buildings. Examples: Puente Hills Mall and Del Amo Fashion Center in Southern California; Deerfoot Meadows in Calgary, Alberta.
- To be torn down and replaced with a neighborhood shopping center or power center, sometimes reusing parts of the mall building for big box stores. Examples: La Mirada Mall and La Habra Fashion Square in Southern California: Capilano Mall in Edmonton, Alberta; and Seven Corners Shopping Center in suburban Washington, D.C. Seven Corners, once anchored by department stores Garfinckel's and Woodward & Lothrop, was an indoor mall with an adjacent strip-style convenience center. The indoor portion was torn down and replaced with a strip of big box stores and smaller shops.

== See also ==
- Neighborhood shopping center
- Strip mall
- Types of retail outlets
