= Shoppers World Brampton =

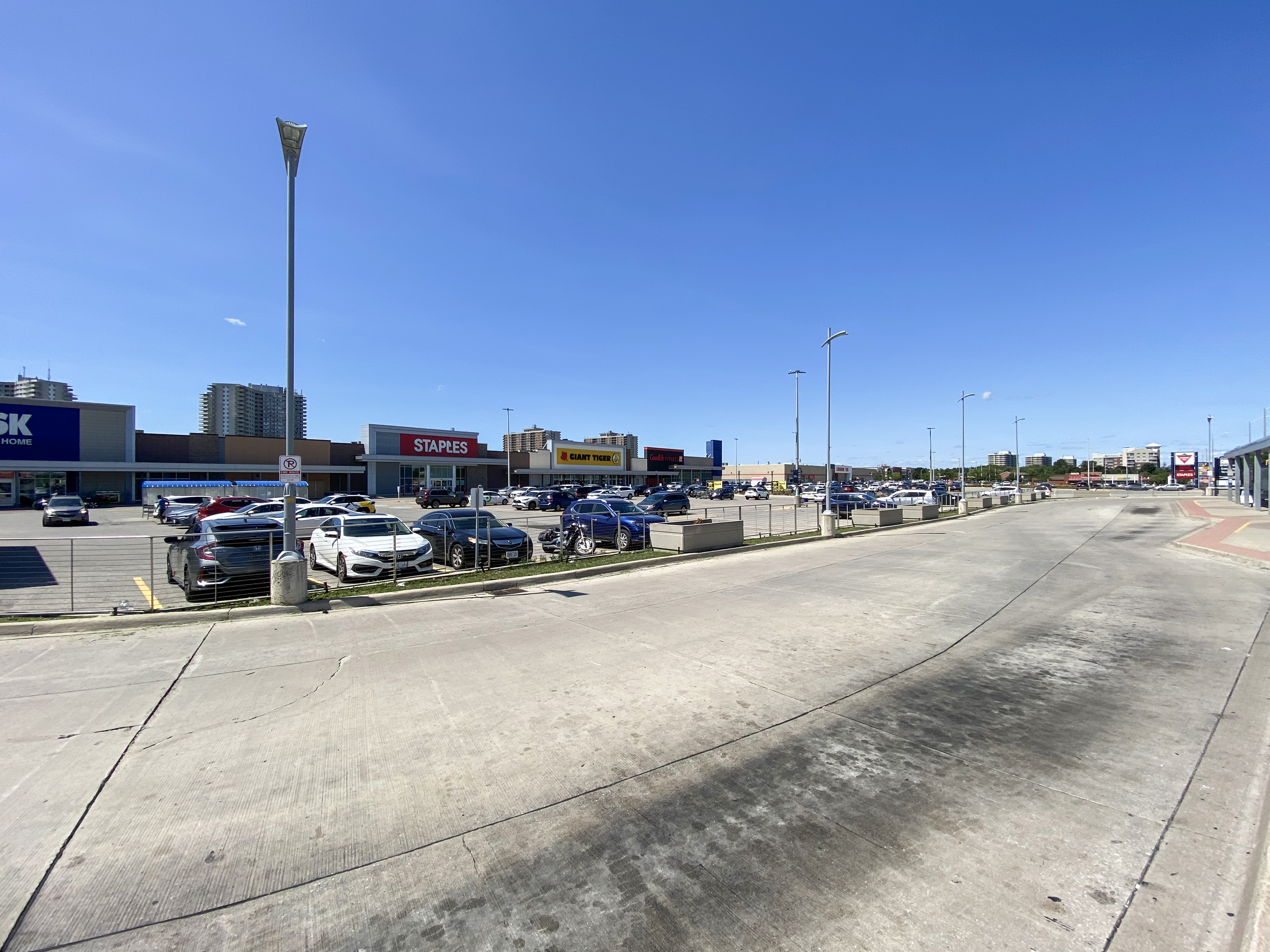
- Exterior of the mall in 2021
- Location: Brampton, Ontario, Canada
- Coordinates: 43°39′58.18″N 79°44′15.05″W
- Address: 499 Main St. S.
- Opened: 1969; 57 years ago
- Developer: Peel Elder Ltd.
- Manager: RioCan Real Estate Investment Trust
- Owner: RioCan Real Estate Investment Trust
- Num. of stores: 190
- Num. of anchor tenants: 4
- Floor area: 781,067 sq ft (72,563 m^{2})
- Floors: 1
- Public transit: Brampton Gateway Terminal
- Website: shopswb.com

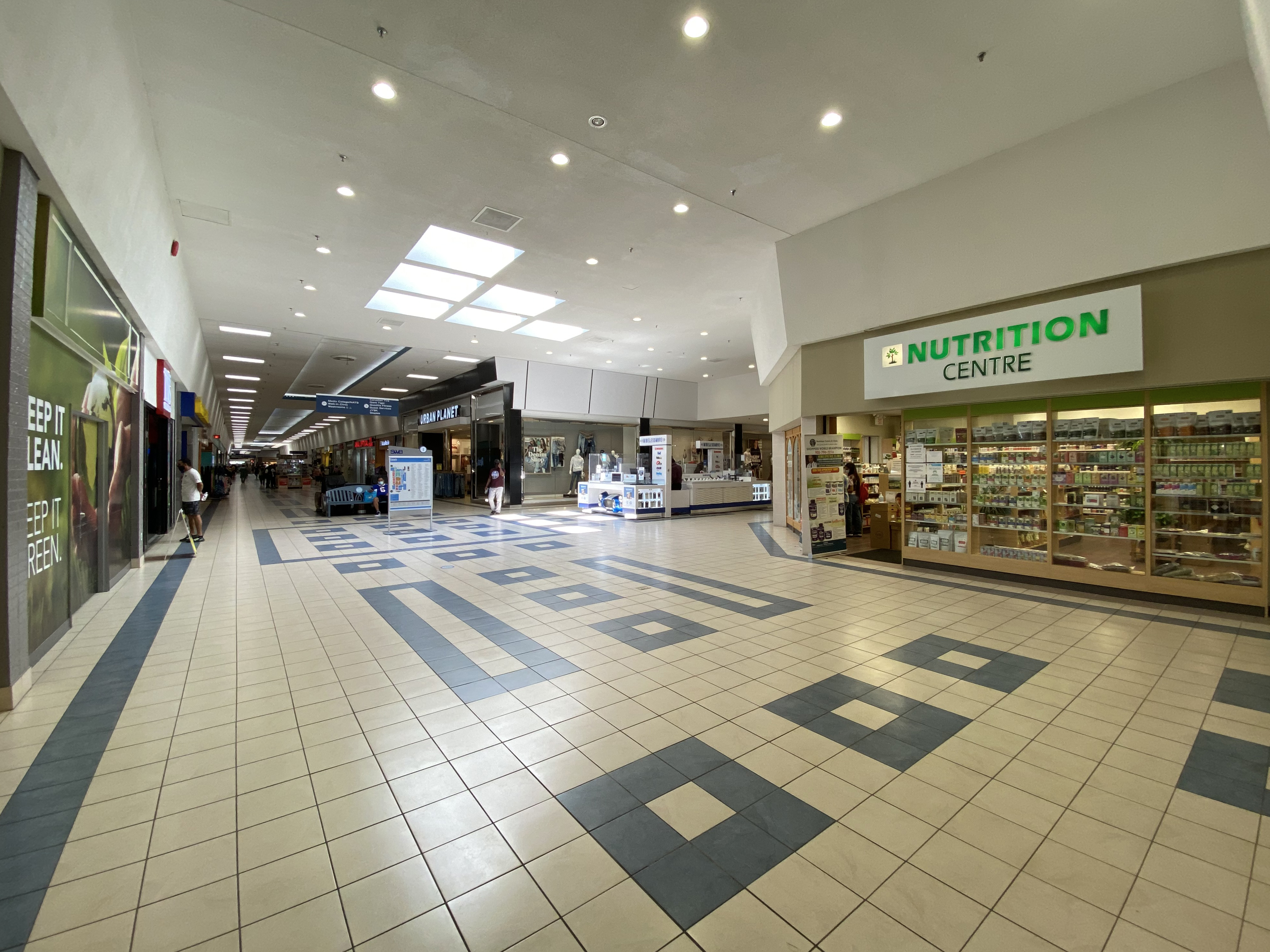
Mall Interior in 2021

Shoppers World Brampton is a shopping mall in Brampton, Ontario, Canada. It is host to over 190 stores, including Canadian Tire, Winners and Staples.

== History ==
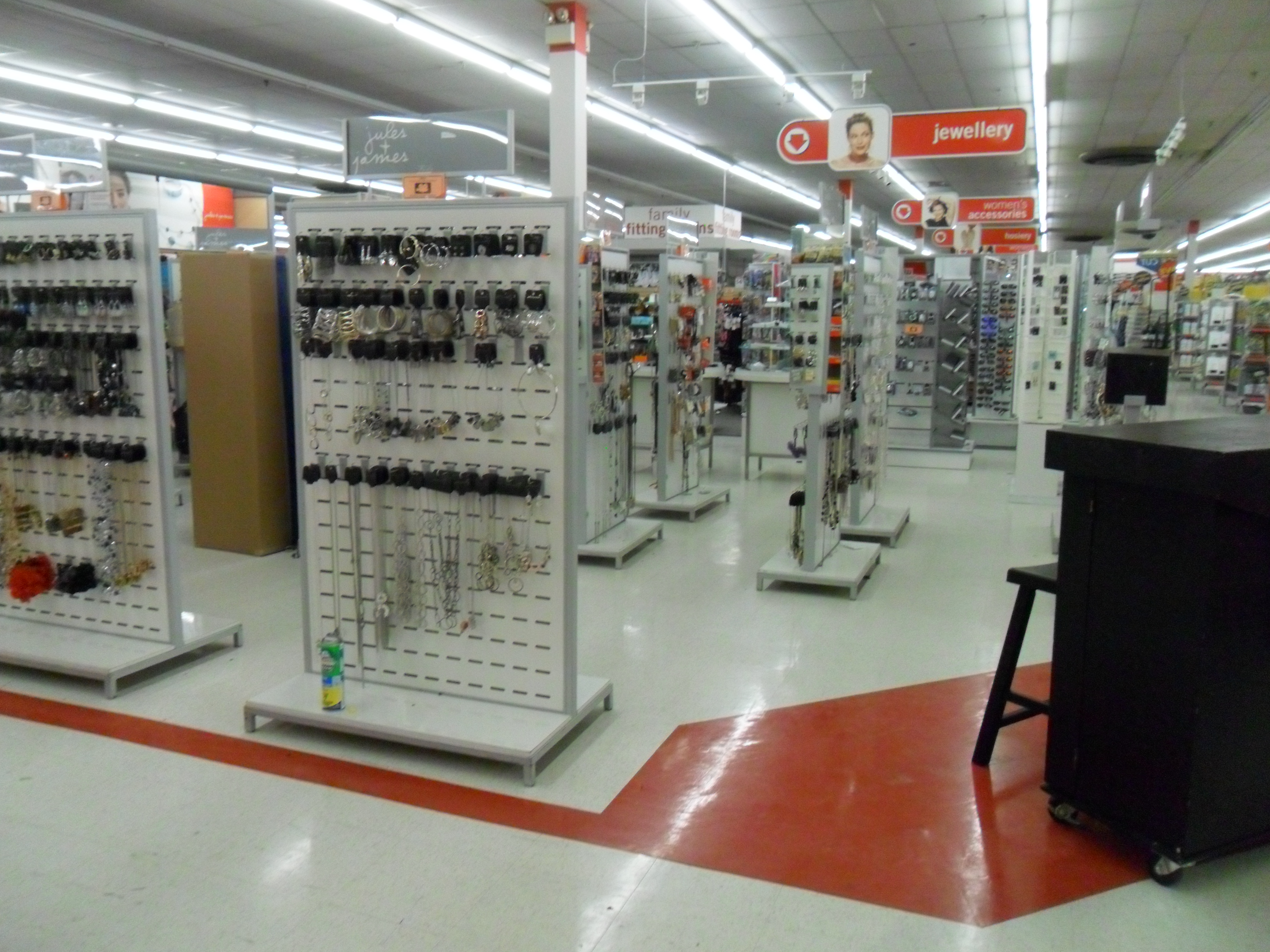
Jewelry at the former Zellers

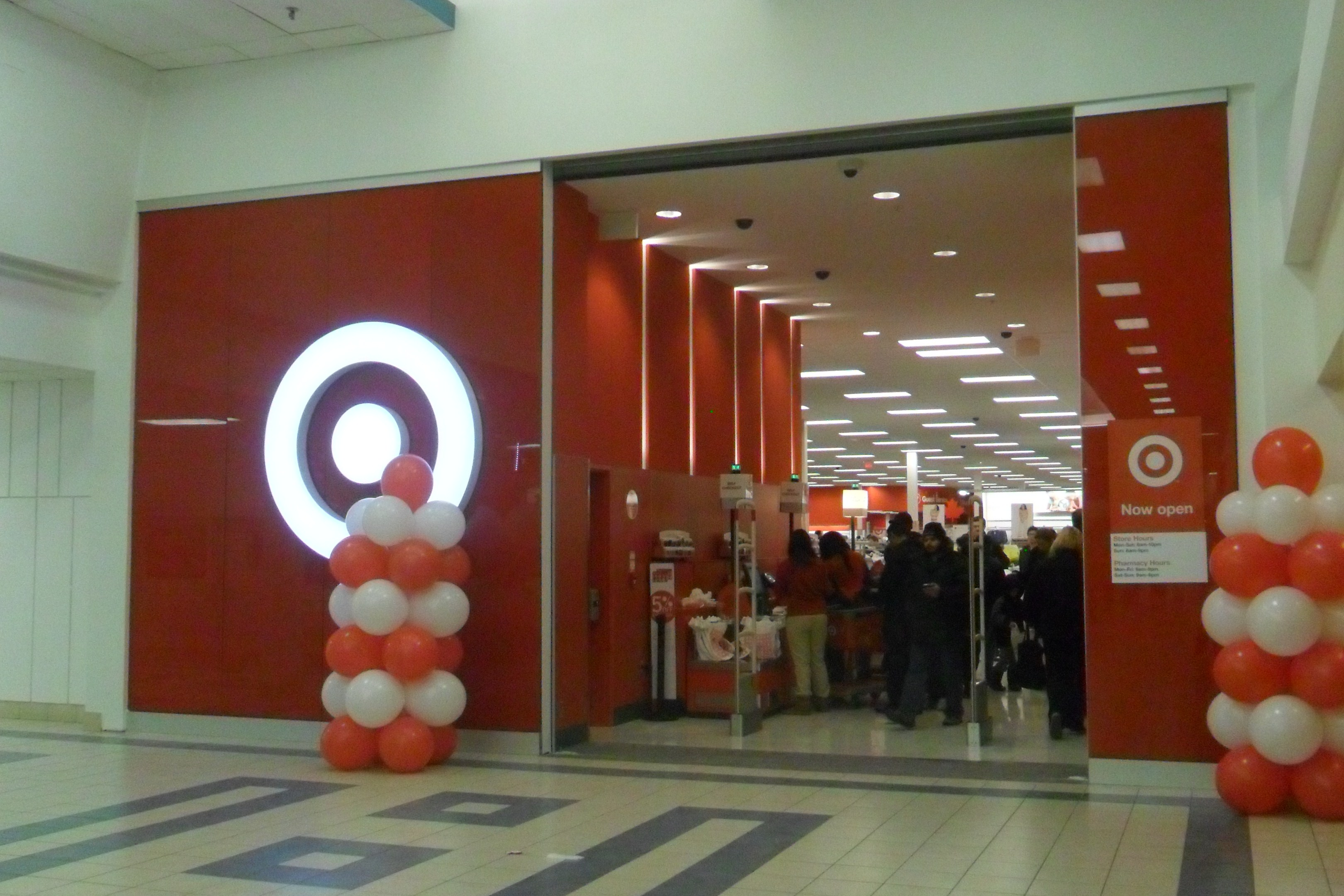
The former Target store, opened in 2013 and closed in 2015

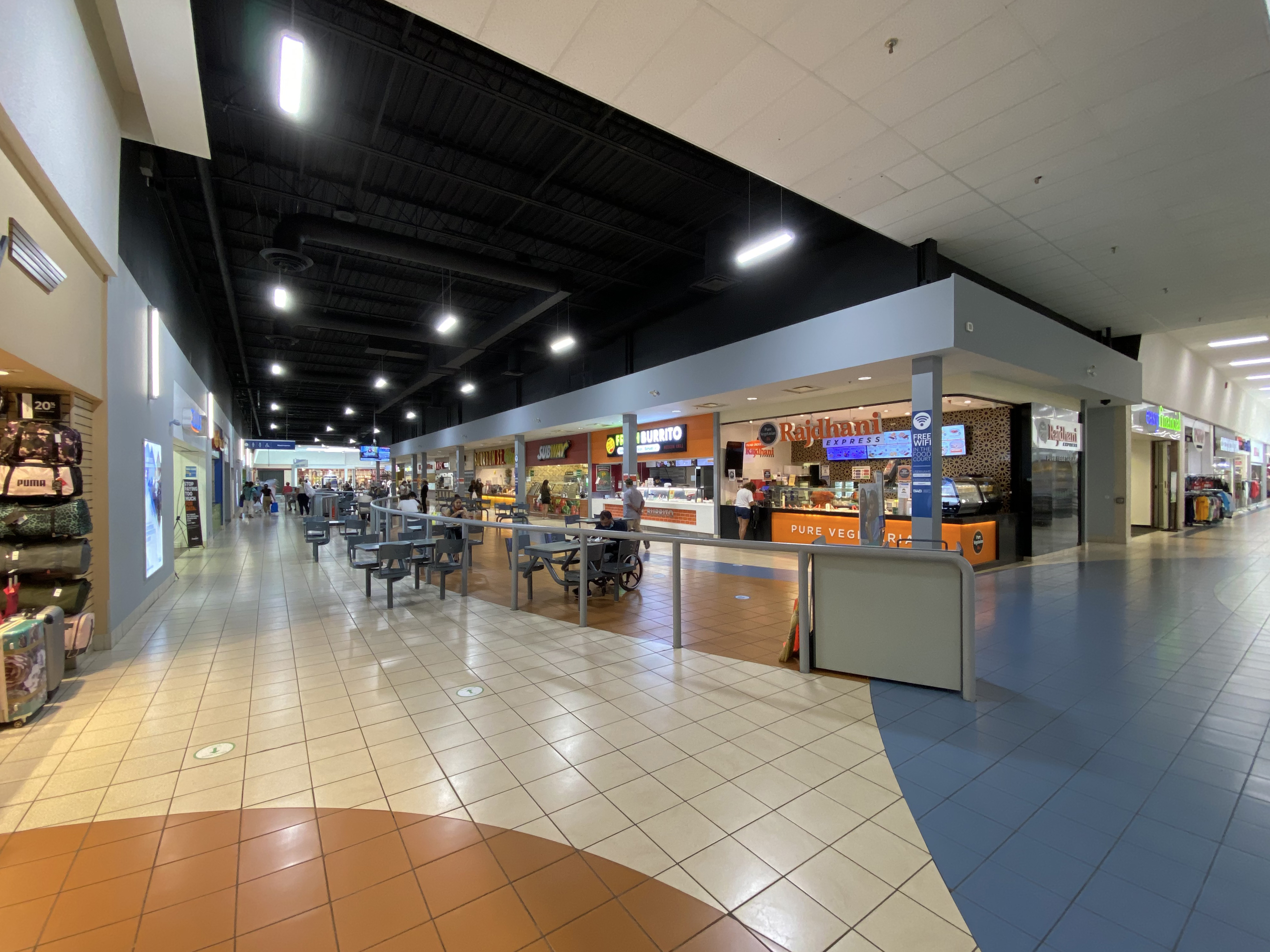
The food court

In 1961, Elder Mines & Development Ltd. and Peel Village Developments created Shoppers World Danforth. Targeted completion date was March 1962.

The two developers merged into a new company, Peel-Elder Limited, and began development of Shopper's World Brampton on a farmer's field that had been purchased by Charles F. Watson of Peel-Elder Ltd. Peel-Elder Ltd. was also the developer of the Brampton's Peel Village community. In 1961, planned tenants were Loblaws, Zellers, Yolles, Bata Shoe, a Maher shoe store, Lady Ellis dress shop, Bi-Rite Drugs, Tip Top Tailors and banks. In all, it planned 55 stores, plus a department store, bowling alleys and a movie theatre. A 1963 advertorial for Peel Village describes the mall with 57 shops.

=== Opening and early years ===
It opened in 1969 as Brampton's first indoor mall. Major tenants at the time were Kmart, Dominion and Canada Safeway, with a total of 25 stores. The movie theatre closed around 1985. It was gutted, and re-opened as a Jumbo Video. The projection booth served as the manager's office. The Canada Safeway store was the first in eastern Canada. Its opening was targeted by 10 picketers inspired by California's Delano grape strike; the store contacted mall management, who called in the Brampton Police. On the second return of police to the mall, protesters were ordered off the property. James Peters, president of United Auto Workers Local 1285 (American Motors) told the other pickets to leave, but stayed by himself. He was arrested, the first arrest since the demonstrations spread to Canada in 1967. The Dominion store did not carry California grapes.

In 1971, Simpsons Ltd. decided to build a location of its department store at the mall, at a cost in excess of $2 million. The first of six scheduled locations, it was to open in August 1972. The 92,000 square foot Brampton site was designed for higher sales, with higher cabinets and 85% selling space, compared to the chain's usual 70% usage. Simpsons' policy was to hold equity interest in its landlords, resulting in it purchasing $5 million of Peel-Elder stock, simultaneous to Hambros Corp. of Canada doing the same; each held roughly 15% of the corporation. The funds were earmarked for expansion of the Brampton and Danforth malls, build high rises in Peel Village, and Preston's Peel Valley Highlands.

Simultaneous to the Simpson's announcement, Peel-Elder Ltd. promised to expand the mall and their Peel Village development. In addition to high rise apartments and townhouses, the developer intended to build a "motel-hotel convention centre and an office building", on 185 acres (0.75 km^{2}) purchased for expansion purposes, back in 1959. After Shoppers World's expansion plans were criticized by the community planning branch of the Department of Municipal Affairs, the office of Premier of Ontario Bill Davis (also the MP for Peel North, which included the mall) was approached by the Town of Brampton, to "see if a revision to a by-law could be made". After the Ontario Municipal Board approved the change, critics charged that Davis had interfered with planning processes. He insisted that "no influence was brought to bear whatsoever" by his office.

The 1972 expansion increased the mall to 118 stores and 600,000 square feet, from its previous 25 stores, 350,000 square-foot maximum. By the opening day, Charles Elder envisioned 140 stores, 1 million square feet of retail, and an office building.

James Kay, chairman of Fairweather/Tip Top Tailors/BiWay ownership corporation Dylex Limited, entered agreements with one British and one Canadian company to purchase two separate Canadian firms, and merge them into one private investment firm. One of the two firms to be merged was Peel Elder. The resultant firm was known as Kesmark Development Limited; nevertheless, it appears the Peel Elder name was continued until at least 1979. Redevelopment began in late 1979, and in 1982, business was said to have increased by 25% in past year.

=== "Phase Two" renovations, 1980s ===
When Dominion and Simpsons decided to build larger, more modern facilities in the mall, owners Kesmark Ltd. renovated the area they had occupied as "Phase Two" of the mall. The multimillion-dollar project, which featured 30 new stores, brought the mall's total to 185. Phase Two opened on March 10, 1982. A third phase, to begin construction that autumn, was announced immediately. The privately held Kesmark Ltd. sold Kesmark Developments Ltd. to Carena-Bancorp Holdings Inc. in December 1983; the company owned only the Shoppers World Brampton, Danforth, and Albion malls. Kesmark was owned by James Kay, controlling shareholder of Dylex Ltd. The mall's new owners were a holding company owned by Edward and Peter Bronfman.

An indoor water park, White Water, was briefly at the mall from 1984 to 1985.

In 1997, the mall was owned by Pensionfund Realty Limited, a privately held real estate company owned by a number of Canada's largest institutional investors.

As of February 2000, OMERS had owned Shoppers World for roughly five years. It swapped Shoppers World for a 2.5% equity stake in RioCan Real Estate Investment Trust. RioCan was to finance the balance of the $46.5 million price with an $18.5 million mortgage on the site.

=== Present day ===
Following a major renovation, the shopping complex experienced an increase in customer traffic. Shoppers World Brampton houses several long-standing, family-operated businesses. In recent years, the mall has seen a decline in foot traffic as newer retail developments, such as Bramalea City Centre and Mississauga's Heartland Town Centre, have captured a larger share of the regional market.

The addition of a Canadian Tire big-box store to the Main Street side of the mall greatly changed the facade of the mall. Many smaller stores were moved or closed to allow for the inclusion of this additional anchor store, which required demolishing the first bus terminal and a mall corridor leading to it, and constructing a new big-box store on the east side of the mall in its place. Canadian Tire had its grand opening week July 12–15th 2001. Staples Business Depot, another big-box format store, also moved into the mall in the locations previously held by Pascals and later, Winners. The Bay closed in May 2007, and the location later became home to a Sears Outlet Store. Price Chopper closed a few months later, and has since been replaced by the multi-ethnic Oceans Fresh Food Market, which opened in July 2008. On November 27th, 2024, Oceans Fresh Food Market closed their store at Shoppers World Brampton, and is expected to relocate to a new location on December 17th, 2024, at Orion Gate Plaza at Kennedy and Steeles.

The former Simpsons/Bay/Sears store at the north-east end of the mall was demolished in October–November 2010, with plans submitted to the City of Brampton to redevelop the north end of the mall. This redevelopment is now completed with most of the stores in this phase accessible only from outside, instead of from within the mall.

A Target store opened on March 19, 2013, in the space that had been occupied by Zellers and previously Kmart. This location was one of the first 24 locations to open in Canada. It closed in 2015, when Target withdrew operations in Canada. The space is now the home to a Giant Tiger, GoodLife Fitness, Staples, and a JYSK.

== Proposed redevelopment ==
In 2019, RioCan, the owners of the mall, unveiled plans to demolish the mall and redevelop it into a mixed-use neighborhood containing 5,000 residences. A proposal was made to Brampton City Council in October 2019; an application went to a public meeting in January 2020. The development, which could take up to thirty years, is expected to be completed by 2040.

== See also ==
- Shoppers World Terminal
- List of largest shopping centres in Canada
- Shoppers World Danforth
