= Midtown Square Mall (Minnesota) =

- Location: St. Cloud, Minnesota, United States
- Coordinates: 45°33′15″N 94°12′1″W
- Address: 3333 West Division Street
- Opened: 1982
- Manager: Caspian Management
- Owner: Midtown Square Mall
- Num. of stores: 58
- Num. of anchor tenants: 2
- Floor area: 181,500 square feet (17,000 m^{2})
- Floors: 4
- Public transit: Metro Bus
- Website: midtownsquaremall.com

Midtown Square Mall, also known as Midtown Square, is a shopping mall located in St. Cloud, Minnesota, United States. Built and opened in 1982, it is an enclosed building that includes both retail and office space. The mall consists of over 50 retail and business spaces, located within two buildings: a two-story shopping center and a four-story office building.

The mall is owned by Midtown Square Mall LLC and Brait Capital LLC and anchored by Midtown Fitness and a banquet/event center, Tuscan Center. Midtown Square has space leased by several national chains, including US Bank and Red Wing Shoes, and is also home to various small businesses, such as a local coffee shop and a hair salon. Other businesses that have leased space within Midtown include St. Cloud's Department of Motor Vehicles and University of Minnesota offices.

== History ==
Midtown Square was constructed and completed in 1982, comprising nearly 181,500 square feet (17,000 m^{2}) of retail and office space. In 1985, an outparcel was constructed in the parking lot, adding additional retail space to the mall; the outparcel was occupied by a US Bank location.

Over the years, Midtown Square Mall has been home to several local arts and crafts festivals, in addition to hosting various charitable events. Workforce Center, a business that dealt with unemployed residents of St. Cloud, Minnesota, was a tenant of Midtown Square Mall until the early 2010s when it closed.

An event center located within the mall, called Tuscan Center, opened in April 2013, filling a large vacancy within the mall. The event space expanded their location in late 2015 after receiving approval from the City of St. Cloud; the expansion included another 2,900 square feet (270 m^{2}) of space, plus the addition of a coffee shop and an outdoor patio. The expansion was accompanied by the opening of a restaurant that operates during conventions and business meetings held within the Center. In total, Tuscan Center contains three meeting and banquet rooms of different sizes that can accommodate a total of approximately 425 people.

In March 2016, the St. Cloud school district reached a decision with the City of St. Cloud to relocate their district offices to the mall after a fire destroyed the school's previous headquarters. The school district had already leased space in the mall for alternative learning programs, but leased additional space to accommodate their needs. Other tenants that have taken residence within the mall include Old Country Buffet and St. Cloud's Department of Motor Vehicles offices, although the former business was forced to shutter following its bankruptcy in early 2016. Since the property's opening, their management offices have been located directly inside the mall. As of August 2016, the center contains a total of nine vacancies of the available 58 tenants.
