= Shoppers World Danforth =

Shopping mall in Toronto, Canada

Coordinates: 43.689629°N 79.290605°W

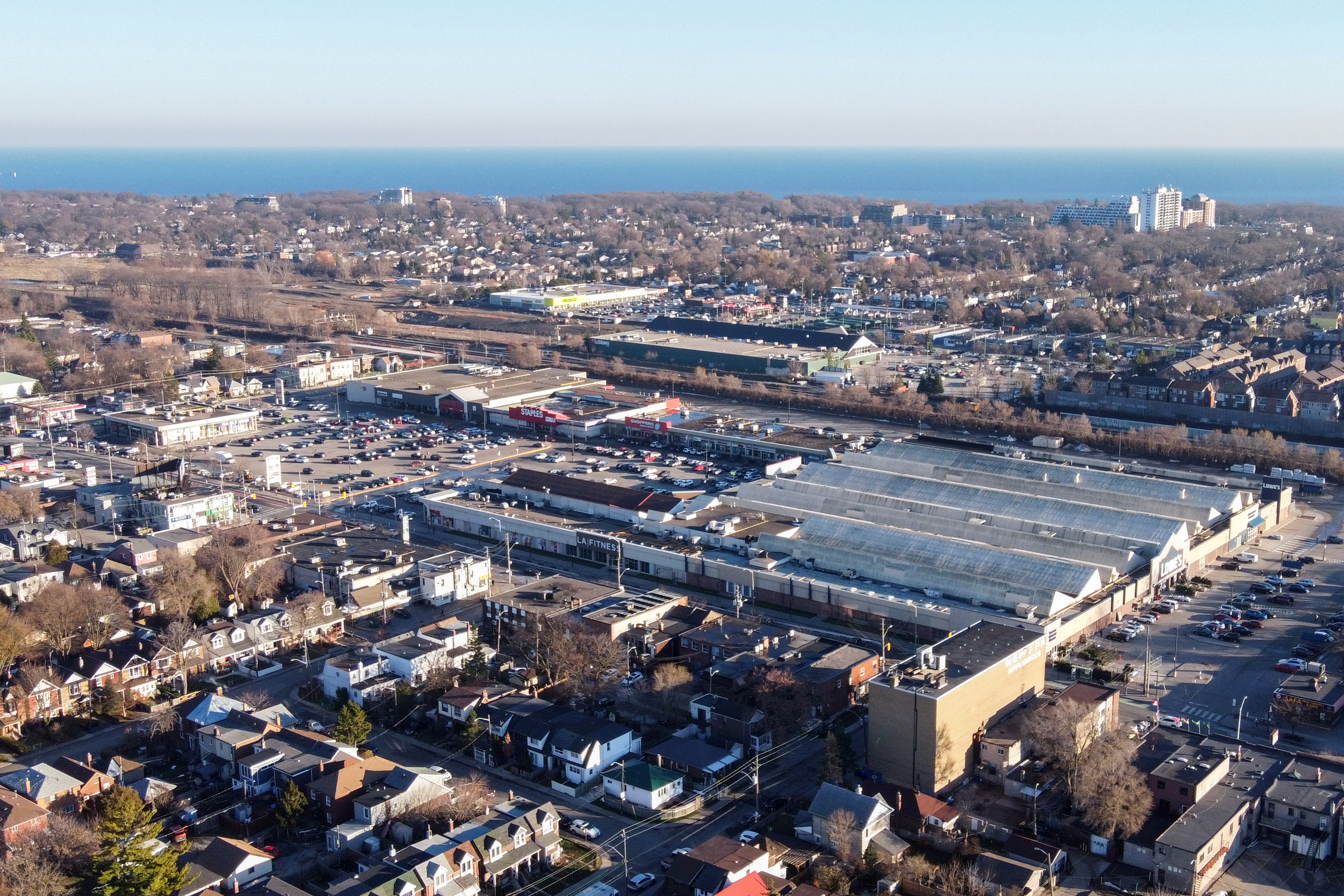
Aerial view of Shoppers World Danforth in 2022

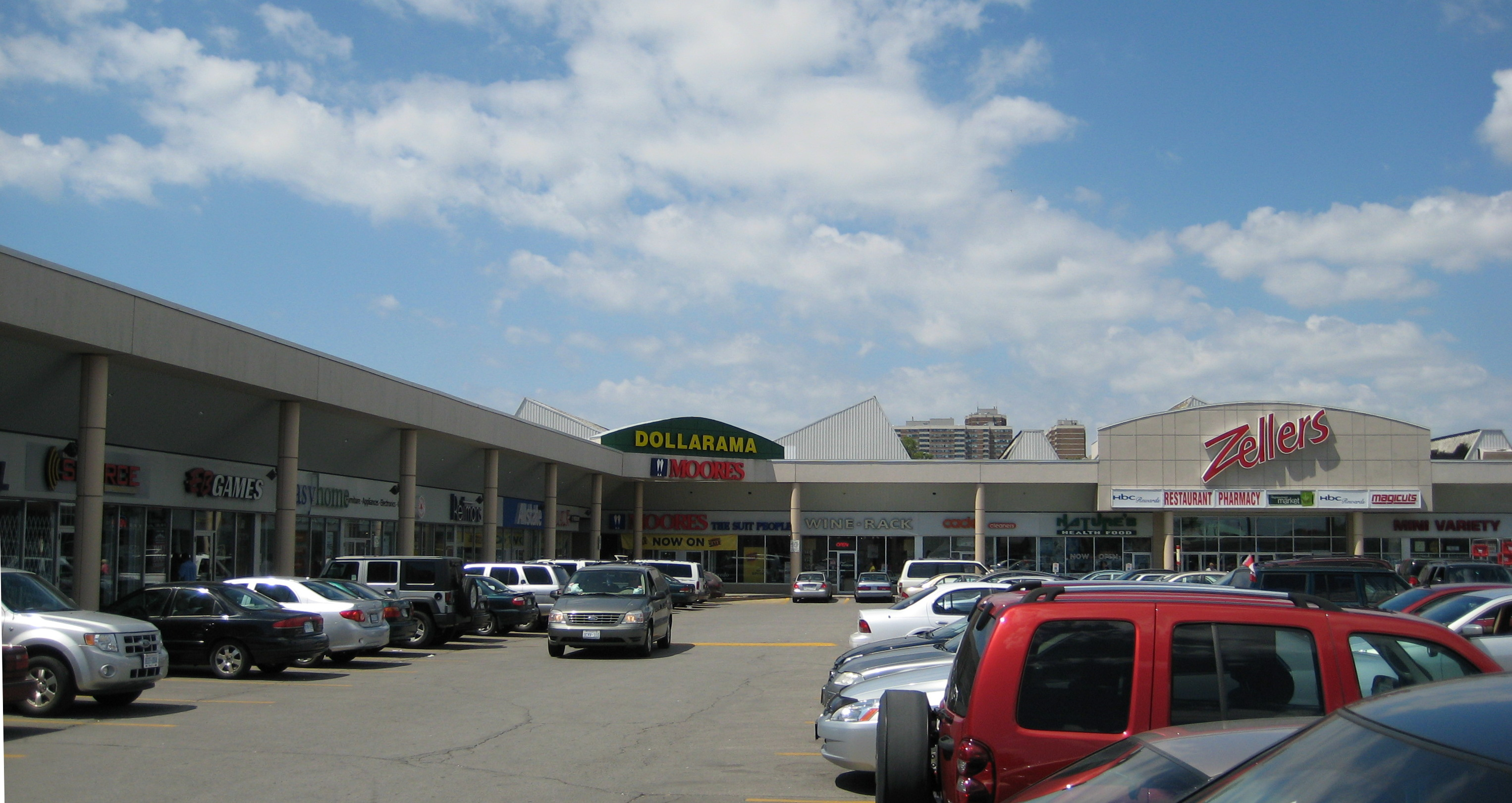
Shoppers World Danforth as of 2009

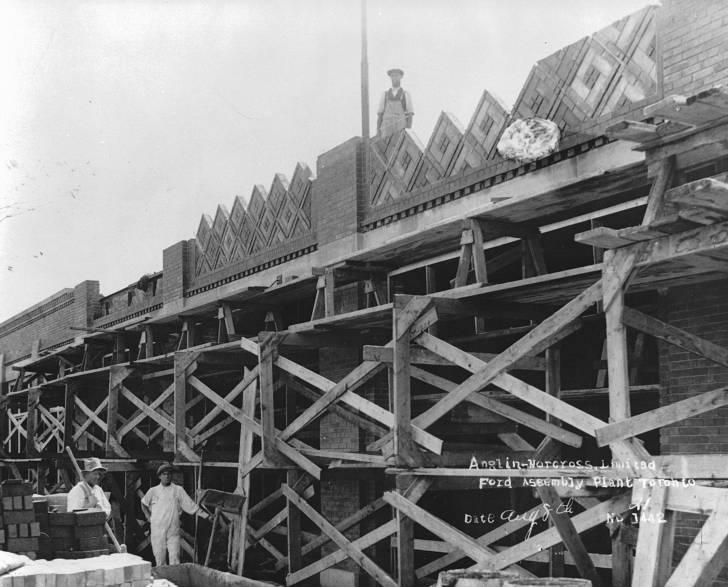
The Ford Motor Company plant under construction in 1921

Shoppers World Danforth is a hybrid shopping plaza and shopping mall in Toronto, Ontario, Canada. It has 40 stores serving parts of East York, Scarborough and The Beaches, near the Victoria Park subway station. Today a moderately sized suburban plaza, it has a notable place in history as one of the first suburban and one of the first enclosed malls in Canada. It is approximately 326,300 square feet (30,310 m^{2}) in area.

== History ==
=== Site use as a car plant ===
In 1921, the site was still a largely rural area on the fringe of the city of Toronto when the Danforth streetcar was extended to a new loop at Luttrell Avenue, just west of Victoria Park Avenue. This led to rapid development of the area. Most notably a Ford Motor Company assembly plant was built covering the large site at the southwest corner of Danforth and Victoria Park. The old factory building is now the main building of the mall.

The plant was the Canadian site of Ford production of the Model T and Model A. It remained Ford's primary Canadian facility until 1953 when Ford decided to construct the new Oakville Assembly Plant. It then became the first Canadian plant of Nash Motors making cars such as the Nash Rambler and the Nash Canadian Statesman. In 1954, Nash merged with Hudson Motor Car Company to create American Motors and soon after the Danforth assembly plant was closed. AMC moved its assembly operations to a new plant in Peel Village Development's Peel Village in Brampton, and the Danforth factory was sold to Peel Village parent company Elder Mines & Developments Ltd, who planned to redevelop it into a shopping centre.

=== Redevelopment as mall ===
In 1962, it was redeveloped into a mall. The mall was built to serve the rapidly growing population of East York and Scarborough. Developer Elder Mines (later Peel-Elder) would go on to build a similarly named Shoppers World Brampton mall a few years later. It was an early Canadian example of what would soon become ubiquitous: the fully enclosed and air conditioned, suburban shopping mall. When it opened it advertised itself as "the world's largest all electrically heated and air conditioned mall." The mall was 98% leased shortly after opening.

The anchor tenant was Eaton's, marking only the second time Eaton's had opened a store outside of a downtown area. Another original tenant was a branch of Murray Koffler's drug store. Previously the stores had all been called Koffler's Drugs, but the new store adopted the name of the mall as Shoppers Drug Mart. Finding the name a great success, Koffler soon applied it to the entire chain. The facility covered 300,000 square feet (28,000 m^{2}) and was the primary shopping mall for the entire eastern Greater Toronto Area until supplanted a decade later by Scarborough Town Centre, which opened in May 1973.

The Eaton's store was converted to a Zellers in the early 1990s. Target purchased most Zellers leaseholds in 2012, and reopened it as a Target store in 2013. Target left in early 2015, and the store was purchased by Lowe's Canada during Target's bankruptcy liquidation. The new Lowe's location opened to the public in June 2016 and closed in 2023.

== Anchors ==
- Metro 53,008 square feet (4,924.6 m^{2})
- Staples 25,500 square feet (2,370 m^{2})
