= Riverdale Village =

- Location: Coon Rapids, Minnesota, United States
- Coordinates: 45.20056°N 93.35223°W
- Address: 12921 Riverdale Blvd NW
- Opened: 1999
- Num. of stores: 100+
- Num. of anchor tenants: 22 (21 open, 1 vacant by around October 2020)
- Floors: 1
- Public transit: Metro Transit

Riverdale Village is an outdoor shopping center in Coon Rapids, Minnesota, United States. It opened in 1999 and has over 75 stores. It is located just off of U.S. Route 10. Anchors include Kohl's, Lowe's, and The Home Depot. Riverdale Village has undergone multiple revisions and additions since its opening. On June 4, 2017, it was announced that Sears would be closing as part of the plan to close 150 stores nationwide. The store closed in March 2017. On June 4, 2020, it was announced that JCPenney would also be closing as part of a plan to close 154 stores nationwide. The store closed in October 2020.
