= Shoppers World Terminal =

Bus station in Brampton, Ontario, Canada

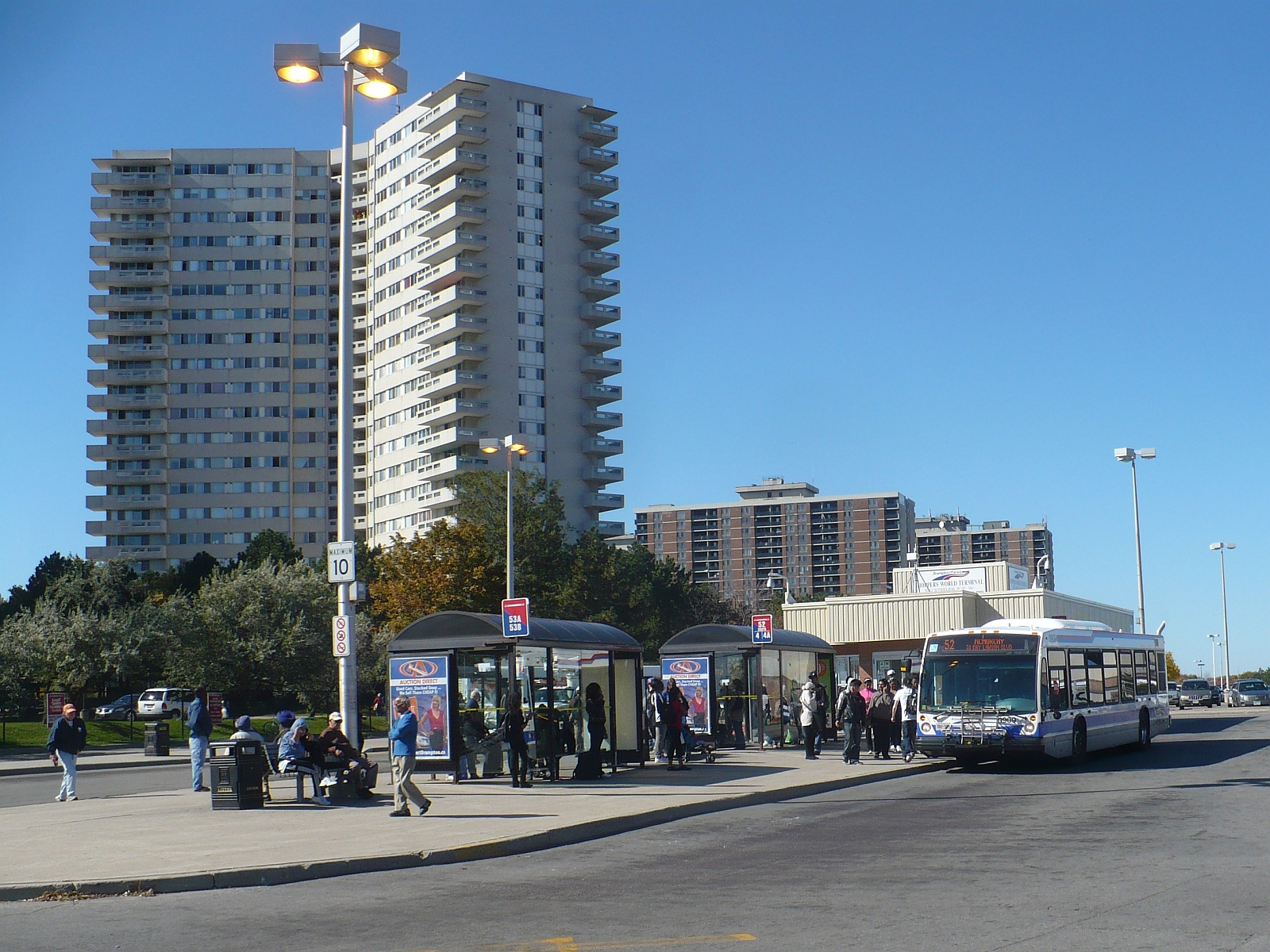

General information
- Location: 100 Steeles Avenue West; Brampton, Ontario; Canada
- Coordinates: 43°39′50″N 79°44′12″W
- System
- Owner: City of Brampton
- Bus operators: Brampton Transit; MiWay

History
- Opened: 1981
- Closed: 2012
- Rebuilt: 2001

Passengers
- 2009: 9000 daily
Location

Shoppers World Terminal was a Brampton Transit bus station that served the south-central and western areas of Brampton, Ontario, including the neighbourhood of Peel Village. It was located on Steeles Avenue, west of Hurontario Street, in the parking lot of Shoppers World Brampton shopping centre. The building included a service counter, snack vending machines, and a heated waiting area. Washrooms at the station were only for Brampton Transit employees.

The terminal was replaced by the new Brampton Gateway Terminal, located on the northwest corner of Steeles Avenue and Main Street, on 26 November 2012.

As of 2009, it was the second busiest terminal in Brampton, after the Bramalea Terminal, which has also been relocated.

== History ==
A transit terminal was built at Shoppers World in 1981, on the east side of the mall.

Six routes went to Shoppers World, as of 1989: 1B Queen from City Centre Terminal, later going to Sheridan College, 2 Main from Heart Lake Terminal to Sheridan, 7 Kennedy down Heart Lake and over to Shoppers World, 8 Centre, along the same route from City Centre, and 11 Steeles, to Albion and Humberline, Martin Grove Loop on Saturdays.

A new terminal was built at the south-west area of the mall on former parking spaces, and opened in 2001. The old terminal was demolished and a new building for Canadian Tire was built in its place.

Building rehabilitation lasted a few months in 2009.

Issues related to the terminal's safety had been raised. The terminal is in a busy section of the mall parking lot, near independent multicultural grocery store Oceans Fresh Food Market. In April 2011, the Accessibility Advisory Committee discussed the matter of the paint signalling the ramp to some bus platforms was faded, an issue for those lacking full depth perception; no motions were considered, but the Accessibility Coordinator later talked with Brampton Transit.

=== New Gateway Terminal ===
In 2009, the manager of Land Use Policy recommended that, with the addition of Acceleride (later Züm) and a proposed Hurontario–Main LRT, there was a "demonstrated need" to move the terminal to the corner of Hurontario and Steeles. Such a move would allow less diversion time from the route to the station, and for a larger station. As a stop on the potential LRT, the terminal is considered part of the Hurontario Higher Order Transit corridor. Expropriations directly on the corner allowed for the terminal to be moved;, which stood in contrast to the old location which was leased. As of spring 2010, the terminal redesign and relocation was scheduled to coincide with the Zum Main Street launch in fall 2011; it was listed as a 2011 service initiative in the agency's 2011 Current and Capital Budget.

Contract 2011–095, for the construction of the new terminal, its amenities, plus road and intersection improvements was awarded to Graham Construction and Engineering. The lowest tender, the contract was worth $10,190,340. Earlier estimates presumed an $8.3 million cost. A city report placed the "higher actual costs" on a limited construction timeline and tendering the contract during the summer.

Shoppers World would be on a proposed light rail corridor along Main and Hurontario, from downtown Brampton (including the Brampton GO Station) to the Port Credit GO Station near Lakeshore Road, passing the Cooksville GO Station.

As of 26 November 2012, the Shoppers World Terminal was closed and the new Brampton Gateway Terminal began operations. All the routes that had been serviced by the Shopper's World Terminal, along with some new routes, were now being serviced from the Brampton Gateway Terminal. The terminal is abandoned and is scheduled for demolition and returning the area of the terminal to be a parking lot for the shopping mall.

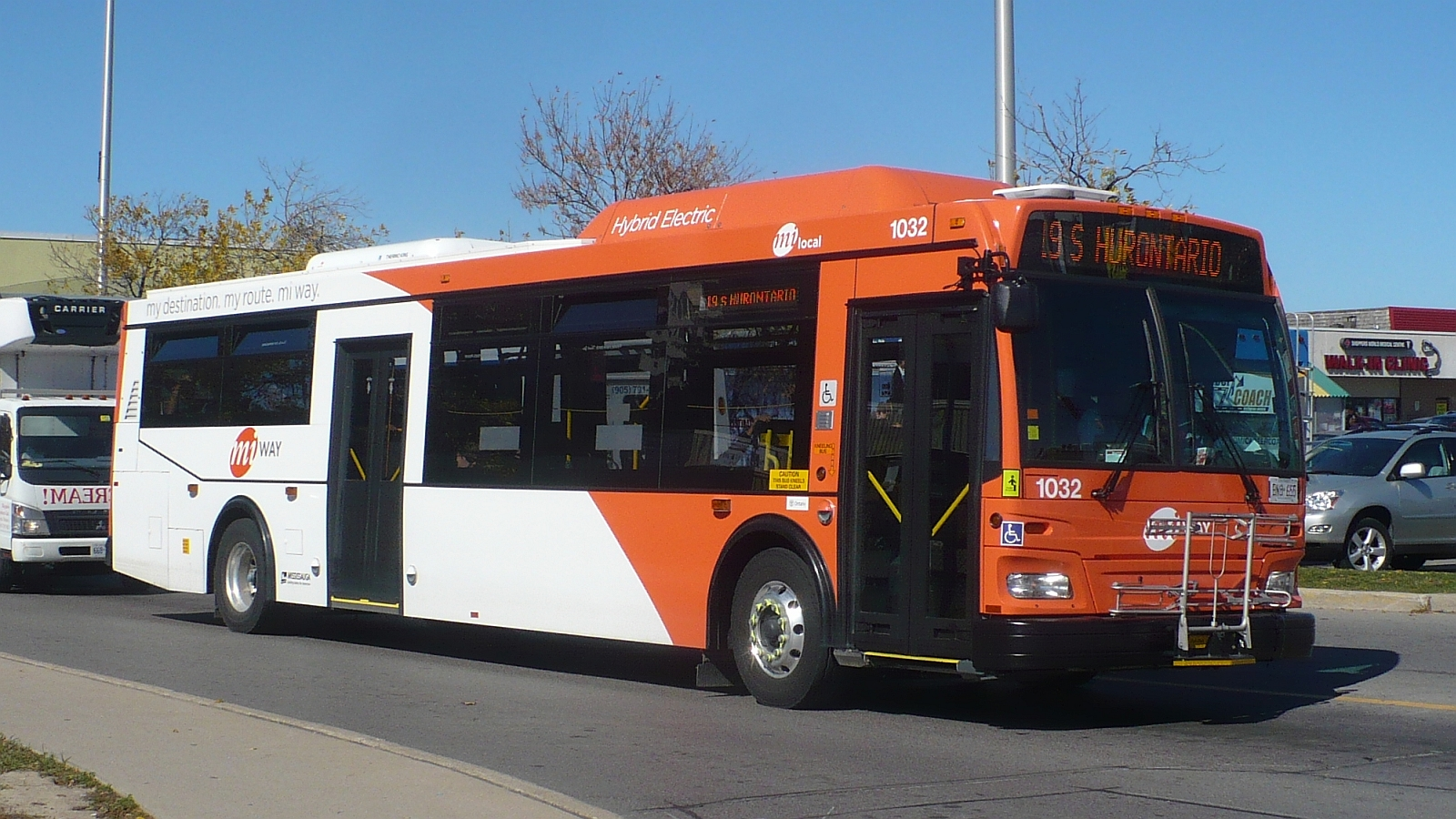
A MiWay bus leaving the terminal
