= Wayzata Bay Center =

- The mall's former north entrance
- Location: Wayzata, Minnesota, US
- Coordinates: 44°58′8″N 93°30′22″W
- Address: 831 East Lake Street
- Opened: June 1967
- Closed: August 15, 2011
- Developer: United Properties
- Owner: Gordy Engel; John Berg; Ray Mithun, Jr.
- Num. of stores: 30
- Floor area: 127,000 sq ft (12,000 m^{2})
- Floors: 1
- Website: www.wayzatabaycenter.com

Wayzata Bay Center was an enclosed shopping mall in Wayzata, Minnesota, a suburb of the Twin Cities. Wayzata Bay Center once comprised 127,000 square feet (12,000 m^{2}) of retail space, with approximately 30 stores on one level, but closed in 2011 after the city of Wayzata agreed to construction of a new facility on the property. The mall was once owned by Madison Marquette until residents of the city purchased the mall for $16 million in December 2004.

Opened in 1967, Wayzata Bay Center was constructed in two phases; the first phase was completed in 1964 while the second phase was completed in 1967. The mall initially featured several regional retailers, along with small businesses, but eventually made way for various national chains, including The Original Pancake House and True Value. After increasing vacancies throughout the center in the 2000s, a Minnesota construction firm purchased the center from United Properties for $16 million in 2009. Following the firm's purchase in 2011, the mall was shut and torn down to make way for a mixed-use retail and residential community center.

== History ==
Wayzata Bay Center was constructed in two different phases in Wayzata, Minnesota. The center was built on top of several wetlands, which were filled in with dirt and concrete to create land suitable for development. The northern phase of the mall was completed in 1964 while the southern phase of the mall was finished in 1967.

The construction of the center cost $1.5 million, contained 1,200 parking spaces, and was anchored by a Country Club Market grocery store. For many years, the mall offered a seasonal shuttle that ferried shoppers around the facilities; this service was discontinued in the late 1990s. The mall did not receive any significant remodeling or renovations until 1980, when four outparcels were constructed in the parking lot of the mall. The outparcels were housed by several restaurants and a Goodyear location.

From 2002 to 2004 the vacancy rate at the mall climbed from 13 percent to 33 percent. In June 2004, the City of Wayzata announced plans to tear down half of the mall, renovate the remaining half, and construct four condominium buildings on the property. Within the same plan included the possible addition of a grocery store to the mall; Madison Marquette hinted at the opening of a Whole Foods Market or a Trader Joe's store. However, these plans fell through when Madison Marquette sold the mall. Owners of The Foursome, a tenant of Wayzata Bay Center since 1967, purchased the mall in December of the same year after the mall's previous owner, a German-based developer, abandoned any redevelopment plans for the site. After the redevelopment of the mall was approved in 2008, The Foursome closed its 30,000-square-foot (2,800 m^{2}) location and moved to nearby Plymouth, Minnesota. Several other businesses closed in 2009, resulting in an even higher vacancy rate at Wayzata Bay Center.

== Closure ==
Despite regularly hosting several local events and art shows throughout the years, significant discussion of the mall's closure occurred in 2004 and 2005. The mall's owner at the time, Madison Marquette, announced plans to "upgrade and enhance" the shopping center, to appear more attractive to businesses and customers. The supposed enhancement plans included removing the enclosed spaces of the mall, but these plans were never carried out.

After talks of closure for years, Wayzata Bay Center closed its doors on August 15, 2011. Demolition began shortly after in April 2012, when all stores in the mall had either relocated or closed. The Original Pancake House, a restaurant, was the final tenant to close in the mall. The restaurant, a tenant of the center since 1994, relocated to neighboring Plymouth, while Adele's Frozen Custard, a tenant in the mall since 2009, closed their Wayzata location entirely. Among the mall's other final tenants were a True Value hardware store, a jewelry store, a health food store, and a furniture store.

When the center was demolished, development began for a senior living facility with mixed retail and office space use. After several months of delays and halts from the city council, construction of the development began in June 2013. The new development, entitled The Promenade, is expected to be fully completed in 2016. When the new project was complete, Presbyterian Homes, the company that purchased the land for redevelopment, referred to the project as "ambitious" and thanked the City of Wayzata for their cooperation throughout the process. The new development consists of several different uses, including senior housing, condominiums, a boutique hotel, and office and retail space.
