= Four Seasons Mall =

- An entrance to Four Seasons Mall
- Location: Plymouth, Minnesota, US
- Coordinates: 45°01′53.7″N 93°24′11.5″W
- Address: 4108 Lancaster Lane North
- Opened: 1978
- Closed: February 29, 2012
- Developer: RMF Group
- Owner: INH Properties
- Num. of stores: 26
- Floor area: 117,000 square feet (11,000 m^{2})
- Floors: 1

Four Seasons Mall was an enclosed shopping mall in Plymouth, Minnesota, a suburb of the Twin Cities. Four Seasons Mall once comprised 117,000 square feet (11,000 m^{2}) of retail space with approximately 26 storefronts. The mall opened in 1978 and the last tenant, Marcello's Pizza, closed on February 29, 2012. The mall was abandoned for a decade until the city demolished it in late 2022. A 411-unit apartment complex, several office and retail buildings, and a Metrolink park-and-ride are planned for the site.

Over the years, Four Seasons Mall was home to several regional chains, including various restaurants and small businesses. Despite its closure, several events periodically took place at the mall, such as arts, crafts shows, and pet Olympics, prior to its demolition.

== History ==
Opening in 1978, Four Seasons Mall became a popular attraction for the residents of Plymouth, Minnesota. The mall was built atop 22 acres of land; however, the land was surrounded by wetlands and not zoned for a large scale shopping center. The shopping center was developed by the RMF Group, who had helped construct other shopping centers, like nearby Brookdale Center. In 1996 the mall was sold for $2.7 million to a group of investors. An arts and crafts store opened in 1988, and a Christmas themed shop opened in 2002. A man attempted to rob a U.S. Bank in the mall in 2007 and after being chased into the surrounding neighborhood committed suicide. The mall still served as a park and ride for the Holidazzle Parade in 1999, and served as a park and ride location for Plymouth Metrolink until 2008, when Plymouth Metrolink and the mall could not agree on a new contract for leasing parking spaces. In 2010 the mall was roughly only half occupied with tenants, which including a natural foods store, a Thai restaurant, and an Italian restaurant.

Following the mall's decline, Walmart expressed interest in the site for the construction of a new store, Contractors for Walmart studied the mall's site and created "a variety of plans and guidelines for the site". Surveyors found the land suitable for a 240,000 square feet (22,000 m^{2}) Walmart Supercenter, but Plymouth city officials were displeased with the idea of a big-box retailer opening in their community. Walmart later agreed on constructing a significantly smaller 87,000 square feet (8,100 m^{2}) location, which was still rejected by the city.

Throughout the 2000s and 2010s, several projects went underway to improve the city water available to the tenants of Four Seasons Mall. Nearby Northwood Lake was included in the projects; as several channels between the lake and the mall had eroded. The channels affected in the projects provided water to nearly 285 acres of land in Plymouth. Several initiatives such as ponding, stream restoration, and flow restriction were considered to improve the quality of the water. In mid 2015, all of the improvement projects were finalized following two years of channel work.

== Closure ==
Despite regularly hosting several arts and crafts shows throughout the years, the mall's vacancy rates steadily increased annually, which prompted the mall's independent owners to place the facilities up for sale. On November 30, 2010, Walmart purchased the entire mall for $10.6 million. Two years after Walmart's purchase of the land, the mall's final tenant, Marcello's Pizza, was forced to close up their 28-year-old location. Lisa Pieper, one of the owners of Marcello's, stated that they "had no choice but to close" after Walmart refused to renew their tenant's lease. Among the mall's final tenants included Marcello's, Curves International, and a family-owned Asian restaurant.

In January 2015, the plans for construction of a Walmart Supercenter fell through when Walmart announced the shopping center's resale. Plymouth city council member Ginny Black called Walmart's decision "disappoint[ing]" and "overwhelming". When the mall's resale occurred in 2015, the entire site was purchased by INH Properties. Various concepts and plans for the site's redevelopment have been created by the City of Plymouth; most of the plans created were inspired by lifestyle centers, with retail and residential space. However, residents of Plymouth were still "overwhelmingly opposed" to the deconstruction of Four Seasons Mall.

== Redevelopment ==
Housing developer Dominium announced a $130 million plan to transform the site of Four Seasons Mall into affordable housing in addition to a small amount of retail, and a parking ramp. According to the city of Plymouth, Dominium's project would house a $58 million five-story senior-apartment building with 210 units. It also calls for two four-story buildings with 220 units that would cost about $65 million combined. The housing units would include more than 500 surface and underground parking spaces for tenants.

Separately, the complex calls for a 229 slot park and ride ramp that would be accessible to the public. Lastly, the project includes designated commercial space for small retail stores or offices, a bank, two drive-through restaurants, and a healthcare clinic.

In May 2021, due to funding issues faced by the Dominium group, the city council of Plymouth voted to buy the property for $6.7 million, and demolish the structure, while searching for other development partners. The sale was expected to close prior to June 30, 2021. Demolition began on November 28, 2022, and took several weeks.
