= Ultra Outlets of Medford =

Shopping mall in Minnesota

- Location: Medford, Minnesota
- Coordinates: 44.1702°N 93.2625°W
- Opened: July 1991
- Developer: McArthurGlen Group
- Owner: Ultra Outlets USA
- Num. of stores: 54
- Num. of anchor tenants: 0 (2 vacant)
- Floor area: 223,660 square foot
- Floors: 1
- Parking: Surface parking
- Website: www.ultraoutlets.com

Ultra Outlets of Medford is an outlet center located in Medford, Minnesota about 55 miles south of the Minneapolis–Saint Paul, Minnesota Metropolitan Area (Twin Cities). Originally opened as Medford Outlet Center in 1991, it was the first outlet center to open in Minnesota. It includes retailers such as Old Navy, Eddie Bauer, Bath & Body Works, Maurices, Famous Footwear and a variety of local businesses. For a brief time the outlet center was known as Preferred Outlets of Medford until it reverted to its original name in 2011. Since 2015, the center has lost a significant amount of National and regional tenants, and could be considered a ‘dead’ mall.

== History ==
The center originally opened with 29 stores and later expanded to 54 stores with two anchor locations at the entrance. Since the early 2010s, the center has dwindled to only a dozen stores due to consumers changing habits such as online shopping and the ongoing COVID-19 pandemic. In addition, with the close proximity of the Albertville Premium Outlets in Albertville, Minnesota and the Twin Cities Premium Outlets in Eagan, Minnesota much of the traffic from the Twin Cities metropolitan area has disappeared. The center once included prominent retailers such as Coach, Liz Claiborne, Levi's, Nike, Gap, Rebok, Harry and David, and Toys "R" Us.

== Ultra Outlets ==
In 2016, the outlet center was sold to Ultra Outlets USA, a company based in Columbus, Ohio, for $2.3 million and was rebranded to Ultra Outlets of Medford. A number of major improvements to the infrastructure, design, and functionality of the center were made over the next few years including the repavement and new traffic configuration of the parking lot along with the addition of free public Wi-Fi. These improvements never came to fruition, with the new owners losing a significant amount of money on their investment. Property records show the property has declined by about 50% to $1.2 million in 2022. This significant decline has likely had significant implications for the small town of Medfords budget.
