= Woodbury Lakes =

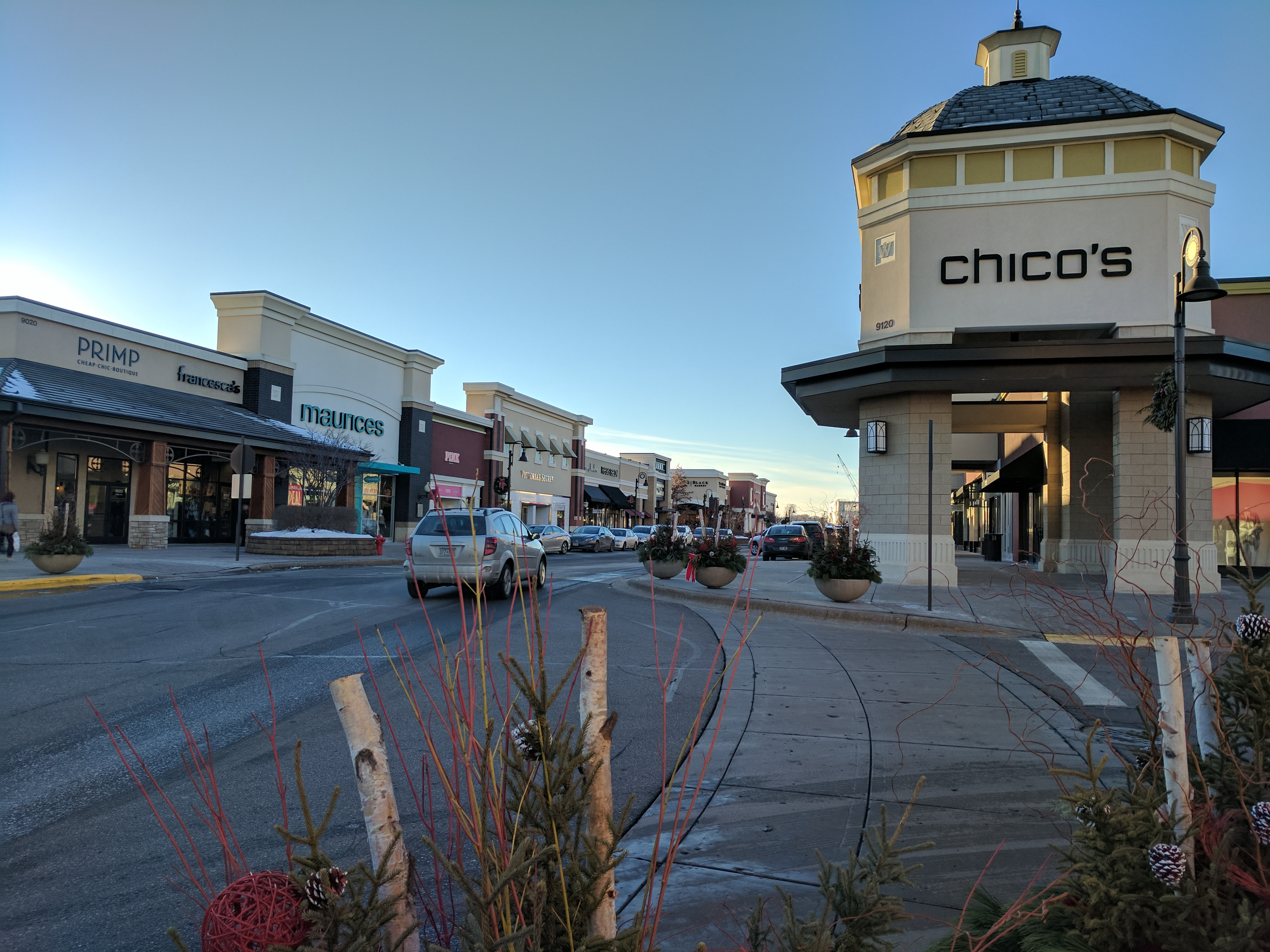
- Location: Woodbury, Minnesota, United States
- Address: 9020 Hudson Road, Woodbury, MN 55125
- Opened: 2005
- Developer: Opus Group (Minnetonka, Minnesota)
- Manager: Ramco-Gershenson Properties Trust
- Owner: Ramco-Gershenson Properties Trust
- Num. of stores: 55+
- Floor area: 400,000 square feet (37,000 m^{2})
- Website: Woodbury Lakes

Woodbury Lakes is an outdoor shopping center in Woodbury, Minnesota, built in 2005 and branded as a "lifestyle center". The mall is located east of the intersection of I-94 and I-494/I-694. The mall contains around 55 retail tenants.

Woodbury Lakes is owned by Ramco-Gershenson Properties Trust (headquartered in Farmington Hills, Michigan), who acquired it in 2014 for approximately $150 million.

== Stores ==
Stores as of March 2024 include:

- Alamo Drafthouse Cinema
- American Eagle Outfitters
- Athleta
- DSW
- H&M
- J.Crew
- Gap
- Pandora
- Sephora
- Sunglass Hut
- Victoria’s Secret
