= Uptown Virginia =

- Location: Virginia, Minnesota, United States
- Coordinates: 47°30′41″N 92°33′19″W
- Address: 1401 South 12th Avenue Virginia, MN 55792
- Opened: August 11, 1971
- Closed: October 31, 2026
- Previous names: Thunderbird Mlal
- Developer: Gamble-Skogmo
- Manager: RockStep Capital
- Owner: RockStep Capital
- Num. of stores: 26
- Num. of anchor tenants: 5
- Floor area: 285,680 square feet (27,000 m^{2})
- Website: Uptown Virginia

Uptown Virginia, formerly Thunderbird Mall, was an indoor shopping center in Virginia, Minnesota, United States. The mall's anchor stores are Dunham's Sports, Hobby Lobby, Tractor Supply Company, Harbor Freight, and Aldi. The mall is owned and managed by Rockstep Capital.

== History ==
Thunderbird Mall was constructed in 1971 by Gamble Development Co. as Thunderbird Mall. Among its tenants were JCPenney, Kmart, and a Jerry Lewis Cinema theater. Herberger's moved its Virginia location from downtown into the mall in 1977, and closed in 2018. The Kmart closed in 2016.

Rockstep Capital (headquartered in Houston, Texas) acquired the mall from Rubloff Development Group of Rockford, Illinois in 2014

It was renamed Uptown Virginia in July 2020.

== Redevlopment & closure ==
In October 2026, it was announced that the mall's interior concourse would permanently close on October 31, 2026, with the remaining stores accessible exclusively from outside the building.

== Location ==
The mall is located on the north side of the U.S. Highway 53. The mall contains around 30 retail tenants.
