= Peel-Elder Limited =

Peel-Elder Limited is a mining company that went into the real estate development industry in the late-1960s, with the Peel Village development in Brampton, Ontario, Canada.

== 1959 takeover ==
On December 9, 1959, shareholders approved Peel Village Developments Ltd. becoming a wholly owned subsidiary of Elder Mines & Developments Ltd. As such the mining company took over the $100-million dollar industrial and residential development of Peel Village. PVD chairman S. E. Coon, president and managing director Charles F. Watson, and secretary-treasurer J. K. Kinsella all became directors at Elder, continuing in their existing roles at the subsidiary. Industrial sites were scheduled first, followed by residential and commercial additions. Through the purchase, W. J. Gilleland of Gilleland & Strutt of Ottawa was to be added as a consultant on Peel Village and in Hamilton; he was partially responsible for construction of the Ottawa airport.

Coon, Watson, and Kinsella jointly controlled a variety of companies, which owned office buildings in the GTA, retaining their own construction staff and crews, with a total of 200 employees. One of their subsidiaries purchased Syd-Co Holdings Ltd., which owned the Terminal Tower properties in Hamilton. Elder Limited had no stated interest in Syd-Co.

Plans for Peel Village, as of takeover, included a 15-story apartment, 20-story apartment, a 200,000-square-foot (19,000 m^{2}) shopping centre, and a 4,500 room hotel; even today, such a hotel would be in the top 10 largest by rooms in the world.

== Post expansion to real estate ==
As their 1961 annual report, Elder Mines & Developments had subsidiaries including Peel Village Developments, Wat-Co Holdings, Shoppers' World (Brampton), Shoppers World (Danforth), and Elder Builders' Supplies. The company's holdings included a gold mine, a major interest Eldrich Mines, which reported significant losses, and large interest in Jean Lake Lithium Mines, and Pump Metal Corporation of Canada. Its president was R. A. Roberts.

That year, Peel Village Developments created Shoppers World Danforth Limited, which begat one of Toronto's earliest indoor malls, Shoppers World Danforth. The center was created before their Brampton mall project, which had been publicly planned since before 1959. Anchored by T. Eaton Co. Ltd., the targeted completion date was March 1962. When it opened it advertised itself as "the world's largest all electrically heated and air conditioned mall"

In April 1966, New Senator Rouyn and Peel-Elder were reported to have found large quantities of elemental sulphur about three miles (5 km) southwest of Truro, Nova Scotia.

As of March 1971, the stock traded at $18.25. The company was said to be considering a "new town", Peel Village Highlands, and by June, Simpsons .

The company had many of the same management team members as Canadian Goldale.

By July 1977, Hambro Canada Ltd. owned 49.86% of Peel-Elder, or 1,636,978 of the 3,283,374 total shares. They announced that the company would make a cash offer for the outstanding shares of Peel-Elder that they didn't own. The proposed purchase price was CDN$13 a share, or USD$13.25 with the option of shareholders tendering the shares.
